= 210th Brigade =

210th Brigade may refer to:

- 210th Brigade, Royal Field Artillery, United Kingdom
- 210th Independent Infantry Brigade, United Kingdom
- 210th Field Artillery Brigade, United States

== See also ==
- 210th Division (disambiguation)
- 210th Regiment (disambiguation)
