= 210th Regiment =

210th Regiment may refer to:

- 210th Aviation Regiment, United States
- 210th Pennsylvania Infantry Regiment, a Union Army regiment during the American Civil War

== See also ==
- 210th Division (disambiguation)
- 210th (disambiguation)
