= 3rd Lancashire Artillery Volunteers =

3rd Lancashire Artillery Volunteers I East Lancashire Brigade, RFA 93rd (East Lancashire) Field Brigade, RA 52nd (East Lancashire) LAA Regiment, RA 293 (East Lancashire) LAA Regiment, RA
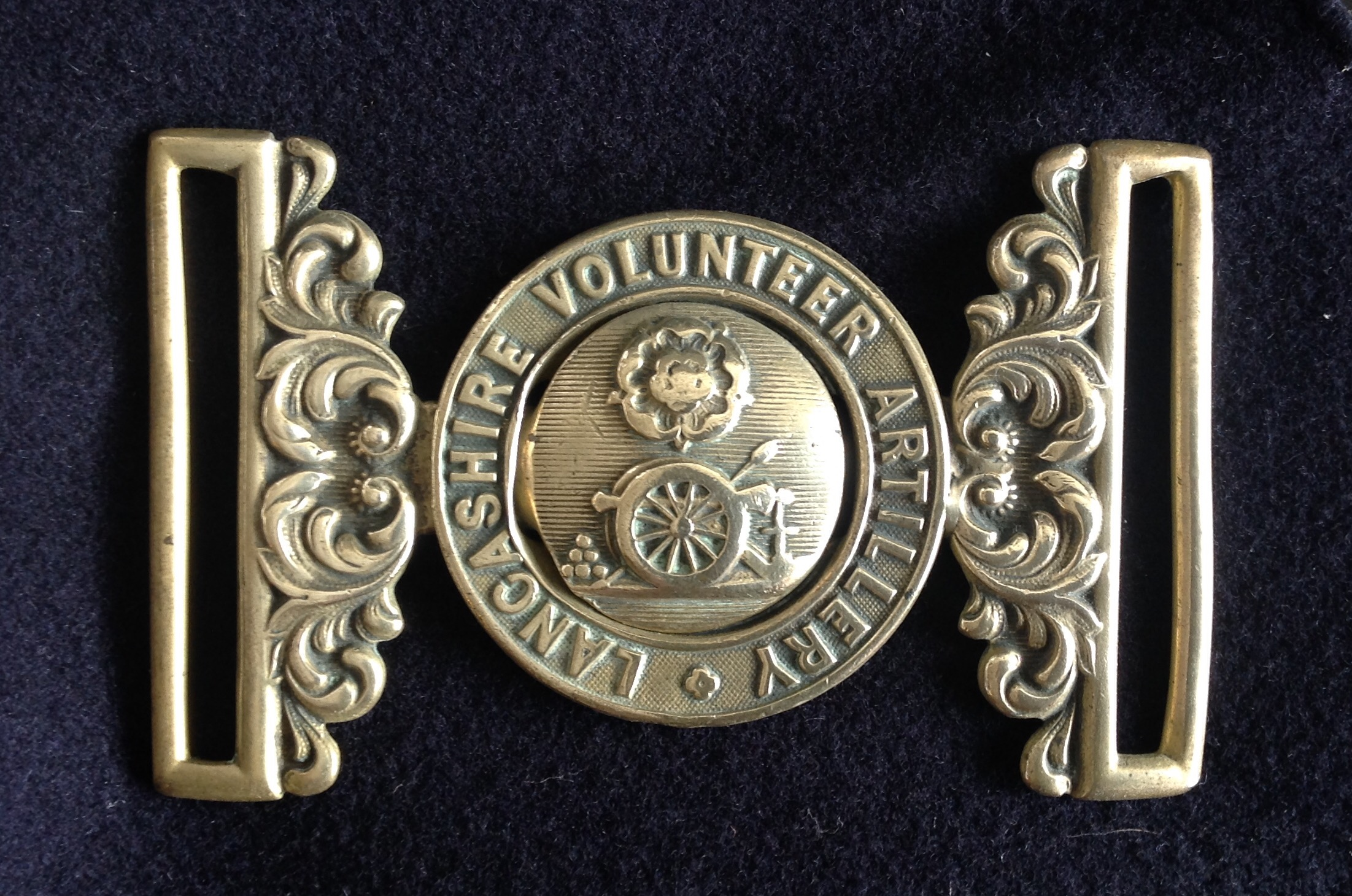
- Waistbelt of the Lancashire Volunteer Artillery, post-1891
- Active: 9 January 1860 – 10 March 1955
- Country: United Kingdom
- Branch: Volunteer Force/Territorial Force
- Role: Garrison artillery Position artillery Field artillery Anti-Aircraft Artillery
- Garrison/HQ: Blackburn; Church; Burnley
- Nickname: The Blackburn Artillery
- Engagements: First World War: Gallipoli; Egypt; Ypres; Spring Offensive; Hundred Days' Offensive; Second World War: Norway; France; Greece; Crete; North Africa; Italy

Commanders
- Notable commanders: Brig-Gen Arthur Birtwistle

The 3rd Lancashire Artillery Volunteers was a unit of Britain's part-time Volunteer Force recruited from Blackburn and the surrounding area in 1860. It became a brigade of the Royal Field Artillery in the Territorial Force in 1908, and served through the First World War with the 42nd (East Lancashire) Division at Gallipoli, in Egypt and on the Western Front. Its second line unit also served on the Western Front in 1917–18. During the Second World War, its batteries operated in the light anti-aircraft role in Norway, France, Greece, Crete, North Africa and Italy. It was reformed postwar, but disappeared in a merger in 1955.

== Volunteer Force ==
The enthusiasm for the Volunteer movement following an invasion scare in 1859 saw the creation of many Volunteer Corps composed of part-time soldiers eager to supplement the Regular British Army in time of need. A large number of independent Artillery Volunteer Corps (AVCs) were formed across Lancashire, and these were quickly grouped into administrative brigades. The 3rd Administrative Brigade, Lancashire Artillery Volunteers was formed at Blackburn on 26 October 1860 with the following units coming under its control:

- 5th (Blackburn) Lancashire AVC, formed 9 January 1860, second battery raised 10 February, four batteries by 21 April 1860
- 18th (Great Lever) Lancashire AVC formed 29 May 1860, joined September 1861 and moved to Bolton September 1862 where a second battery was formed; commanded from 14 February 1861 by Charles Ainsworth of the Ainsworth cotton spinning family of Great Lever and Bolton
- 22nd (Church) Lancashire AVC formed 23 October 1860; commanded from 3 October 1863 by Edward Pilkington of Pilkington Brothers glassworks; merged into 5th in June 1869
- 23rd (Chorley) Lancashire AVC formed 20 November 1860
- 26th (Birkdale ) Lancashire AVC formed 2 October 1865, commanded by Captain William Nicholson of the 3rd Royal Lancashire Militia; moved to Southport about April 1866

From 24 October 1861 the Lieutenant-Colonel Commandant of the brigade was John B. Bowdon. He was succeeded by Charles Ainsworth from the 18th Lancashire AVC. When the AVCs were consolidated on 16 March 1880, the whole brigade briefly became the 5th Lancashire AVC (taking the number of its senior constituent) before being renumbered as the 3rd Lancashire AVC on 15 June 1880. It had the following composition:

- Headquarters (HQ) at Blackburn
- Nos 1–5 Batteries at Blackburn – from 5th AVC
- No 6 Battery at Church – from 5th AVC
- Nos 7–9 Batteries at Bolton – from 18th AVC
- Nos 10–12 Batteries at Chorley – from 23rd AVC
- Nos 13–14 Batteries at Southport – from 26th AVC

The unit became part of the Lancashire Division of the Royal Artillery from 1 April 1882. R.W. Thom became Lt-Col on 10 May 1882, with several other members of the Thom engineering family of Blackburn among his officers; W.J. Thom took over command on 9 October 1895. When the RA's divisional structure was reorganised on 1 July 1889, the 3rd Lancashire became part of the Southern Division, RA; the Bolton batteries were detached to form their own 9th Lancashire, leaving the 3rd with eight batteries.

As well as manning fixed coast defence artillery, some of the early AVCs manned semi-mobile 'position batteries' of smooth-bore field guns pulled by agricultural horses. But the War Office refused to pay for the upkeep of field guns for Volunteers and they had largely died out in the 1870s. In 1888 the 'position artillery' concept was revived and some Volunteer companies were reorganised as position batteries to work alongside the Volunteer infantry brigades. By 1891 the whole of the 3rd Lancashire Volunteer Artillery was organised as position batteries: initially four, three from 14 July 1892, but four again by 30 September 1894:

- HQ, 2 and 4 Btys at Blackburn
- 1 Bty at Church
- 3 Bty at Chorley

On 1 June 1899 all the Volunteer artillery units became part of the Royal Garrison Artillery (RGA) and with the abolition of the RA's divisional organisation on 1 January 1902, the unit became the 3rd Lancashire Royal Garrison Artillery (Volunteers) with its HQ at Blackburn. 'Position artillery' was redesignated 'heavy artillery' in May 1902.

== Territorial Force ==
When the Volunteers were subsumed into the new Territorial Force (TF) under the Haldane Reforms of 1908, the 3rd Lancashire RGA (V) of five heavy batteries was transferred to the Royal Field Artillery (RFA) and designated the I (or 1st) East Lancashire Brigade with the following organisation:

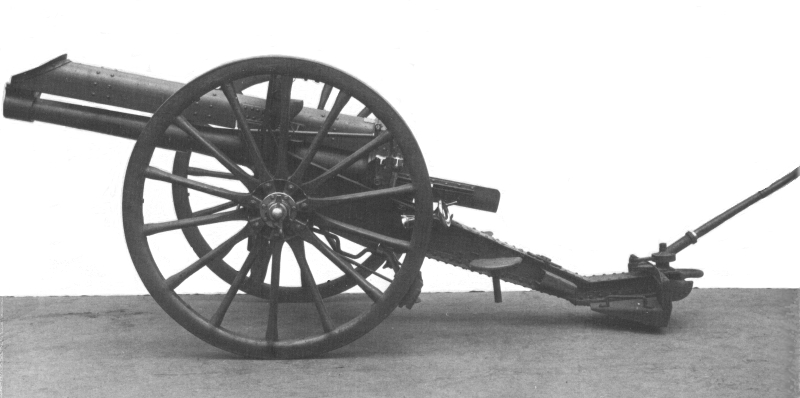
15-pounder field gun issued to TF brigades.

- Brigade HQ at 50 King Street, Blackburn
- 4th Lancashire Bty, RFA, at King Street
- 5th Lancashire Bty, RFA, at Church
- 6th Lancashire Bty, RFA, at Burnley
- 1st East Lancashire Ammunition Column, at Blackburn

The brigade formed part of the divisional artillery for the TF's East Lancashire Division. Whereas the other East Lancashire Division RFA brigades received official local subtitles – 'Manchester Artillery', 'Bolton Artillery', 'Cumberland Artillery' – the Blackburn-based unit did not, although it was routinely referred to as the 'Blackburn Artillery'. Before the First World War, the brigade was equipped with four 15-pounder field guns to each battery, and commanded by Lt-Col T. Frankish.

== First World War ==
=== Mobilisation ===
Units of the East Lancashire Division had been on their annual training when war came: on 3 August they were recalled to their drill halls and at 17.30 next day the order to mobilise was received. The men were billeted within reach of their drill halls while the mobilisation process went on.

On 10 August, TF units were invited to volunteer for Overseas Service. The infantry brigades of the East Lancashire Division volunteered by 12 August and soon 90 per cent of the division had signed up. On 15 August 1914, the War Office issued instructions to separate those men who had opted for Home Service only, and form these into reserve units. On 31 August, the formation of a reserve or 2nd Line unit was authorised for each 1st Line unit where 60 per cent or more of the men had volunteered for Overseas Service. The titles of these 2nd Line units would be the same as the original, but distinguished by a '2/' prefix and would absorb the flood of volunteers coming forward. In this way duplicate batteries, brigades and divisions were created, mirroring those TF formations being sent overseas.

=== 1/I East Lancashire Brigade, RFA ===
On 20 August the East Lancashire Division moved into camps around Bolton, Bury and Rochdale, and on 5 September it received orders to go to Egypt to complete its training and relieve Regular units from the garrison for service on the Western Front. It embarked on a convoy of troopships from Southampton on 10 September, and landed at Alexandria on 25 September, the first TF division to go overseas. 1/I East Lancs Bde was commanded by Lt-Col Arthur Birtwistle, promoted from command of 6th Bty. Some units moved into the Suez Canal defences in October before war broke out with Turkey on 5 November. 1/I East Lancs Bde was sent to the Canal Zone on 20 January 1915, its guns concealed on the west bank. 1/5th East Lancs Bty was at El Kubri in the South Sector, 1/4th and 1/6th at Kantara in the North Sector. The Turks attempted a crossing on 3 February: the regiment attacking the Kantara Gap was engaged with great effect by 1/4th and 1/6th Btys at ranges of 3,000 yards (2,700 m) to 2,000 yards (1,800 m) and did not press home its attack. The attacks against El Kubri had been more feeble. Afterwards the Turks retired and training was resumed.

==== Gallipoli ====
On 1 May the division began embarking for the Gallipoli campaign. Only 24 of the division's guns were taken in the first lift; 1/I East Lancs Bde contributed 1/5th Bty (4 guns under Maj J.G. Browning) and a section of 1/6th Bty (2 guns) all under Lt-Col Birtwistle. The units were landed at Cape Helles, where an assault landing had been carried out on 25 April. 1/I East Lancs Bde arrived on 9 May, after the division's infantry had already been in action for three days. The beachhead was so congested that the rest of the artillery was ordered to return to Egypt. Lieutenant-Col Birtwistle with his six guns was placed in command of a sub-group including Australian and New Zealand batteries. Artillery ammunition was also scarce at Helles, with an allowance of three rounds per gun per day.

After a period of Trench warfare, the division (designated the 42nd (East Lancashire) Division from 25 May) attacked on 4 June at the Third Battle of Krithia, with 127th (Manchester) Brigade leading. The heavy guns and howitzers began firing on strongpoints at 08.00, then all guns, including 1/I East Lancs' six 15-pdrs, began a bombardment of the Turkish front line trench at 11.05. The guns ceased fire at 11.20, when the infantry cheered and showed their bayonets above the parapet, hoping to induce the enemy to man their trenches. This was successful and the guns resumed their bombardment, causing heavy casualties, until 12.00, when the infantry launched their attack and the guns lifted onto the enemy rear trenches. The Turkish front line trenches were taken within five minutes, and the brigade penetrated four lines of trenches by the afternoon. However, the formations on either side of 127th Bde were held up, the successes were not reinforced so the foremost captured positions became untenable, and the Manchesters were withdrawn to the Turkish first line at 18.30, having suffered heavy casualties for a final gain of just 400 yards (370 m).

The strength of 42nd (EL) Division dwindled through the summer from sickness as well as battle casualties, despite some drafts arriving from the 2nd Line units at home. Although some of the infantry units were given periods of rest on the island of Imbros, and further batteries of 42nd Divisional Artillery (42nd DA) arrived from Egypt, 1/5th Bty and the two guns of 1/6th Bty remained in action the whole time. On 7 August the division was called upon to make a diversionary attack against Krithia Vineyard to cover a new landing further up the coast. The bombardment, with British, French and naval guns contributing, began at 08.10 and increased in intensity at 09.00. Although the fire was accurate, the Turkish trenches suffered little damage. The infantry went forward at 09.40, wearing tin triangles on their backs so that the artillery observation posts (OPs) could track their progress. The attack was partially successful, the vineyard being captured, but casualties were heavy. However the Turks had been pinned while the main attacks went ahead, and they in turn suffered heavy casualties in their counter-attacks.

After a short period in reserve, 42nd (EL) Division spent the following months engaged in trench warfare, suffering from sickness, and then from bad weather as winter set in. 1/I East Lancs Bde was reinforced on 23 September when 1/4th Bty and the other section of 1/6th Bty arrived, but the Brigade Ammunition Column (BAC) remained in Egypt.

Between 27 and 31 December the exhausted infantry of 42nd (EL) Division were evacuated from Helles to Mudros, but 42nd DA stayed behind, supporting 13th (Western) Division. The last Turkish attack at Helles was beaten off on 7 January 1916, but a full evacuation was already under way. As 13th (W) Division's modern guns were withdrawn, they were replaced with the old ones of 42nd (EL) Division, so that fire was maintained without obvious slackening. Finally, those old guns that could not be got away were destroyed, and 13th (W) Division was evacuated to Mudros on the night of 8/9 January.

==== Egypt ====
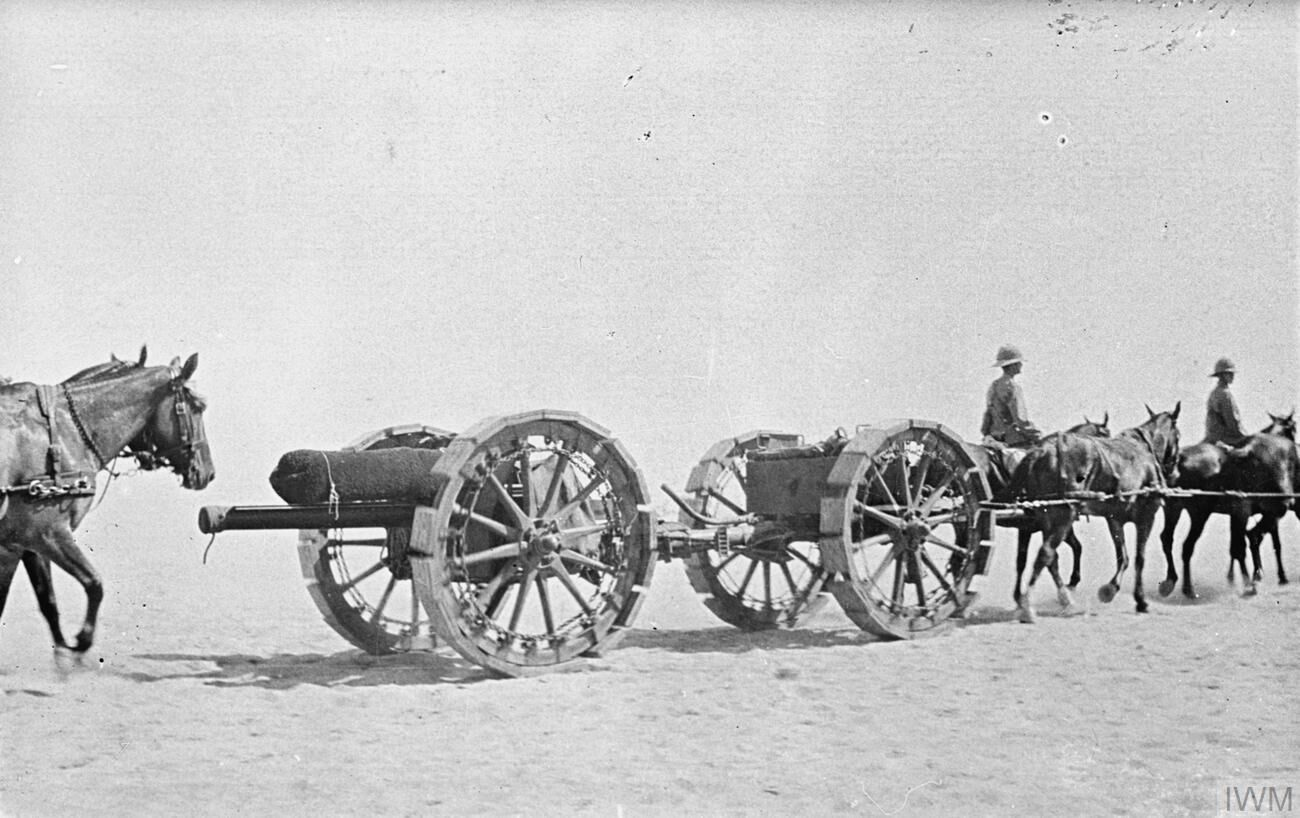
18-pounder with sand wheels in the Suez Canal area.

42nd (EL) Division was then sent from Mudros back to Egypt, the bulk of the RFA embarking on 14 January in a storm. The division concentrated at Mena Camp on 22 January before moving into the southern sector of the Suez Canal defences. Once back in Egypt 1/I East Lancs Bde was reunited with its BAC and on 29 February 1916 was rearmed with modern 18-pounder guns handed over by 29th Division as it left for the Western Front. On 6 May 1916 1/I East Lancs Bde was numbered CCX (210) Brigade, RFA, and the batteries designated A, B and C.

The canal defences were now situated east of the waterway, with a string of self-contained posts, each garrisoned by an infantry battalion and an artillery battery. The division did much of the construction and trained in the desert, the gunners carrying out field firing with their new guns. The gun wheels were fitted with 'ped-rails' to assist movement across soft sand, for which 12 rather than 6 horses were harnessed to gun-carriages and limbers. In late July the division was ordered north, where a Turkish column was advancing on the defences. This column was defeated at the Battle of Romani near Pelusium on 4–5 August, after which 42nd (EL) Division set off in pursuit. The men and horses suffered badly from lack of water, but the Turks lost heavily. The division then returned to the Romani and Pelusium area by 15 August, the bulk of the artillery and ammunition columns at Kantara and Ballah, with C Bty of CCX Bde at Romani.

For the next few months the division was part of the Desert Column covering the extension of the railway and water pipeline into the Sinai Desert to permit the Egyptian Expeditionary Force to mount an offensive into Palestine. The head of the Desert Column reached El Arish, near the Palestine frontier, on 22 December. From 25 December to 24 January 1917 Lt-Col Birtwistle was away, acting as commander, Royal Artillery (CRA) for the 52nd (Lowland) Division. On 26 December 1916 CCX Bde was reorganised: A Bty was split between B and C to bring them up to six guns each (they were redesignated A and B) and B (Howitzer) Bty joined from CCXIII Bde (formerly 1/2nd Cumberland (H) Bty in 1/IV East Lancs Howitzer Bde (Cumberland Artillery)) and became C (H) Bty, equipped with 4.5-inch howitzers.

On 28 January 1917, after the division reached El Arish, orders arrived for it to be sent to the Western Front. By 12 February the division had withdrawn to Moascar, where CCX Bde was reorganised again: C (H) Bty became D (H), and A Bty arrived from CCXII (formerly 1/II East Lancs Bde (Manchester Artillery)) as C Bty. On 22 February the division began embarking at Alexandria, with CCX Bde aboard SS Manitou, except D Bty, which was four days behind aboard HM Transport Kingstonian, and the BAC split between HMTs Menominee and Kalyan.

==== France and Flanders ====
42nd (East Lancashire) Division's formation sign.

CCX Brigade disembarked at Marseille on 1 March and entrained for the divisional concentration point of Pont-Remy, near Abbeville, where it arrived on 4 March, D Bty catching up on 7 March. CCX Brigade Ammunition Column arrived on 12 March. The Divisional Ammunition Column (DAC) had been left in Egypt (becoming the DAC for 74th (Yeomanry) Division) and on arrival in France, the BACs were abolished (this had been done long before in divisions on the Western Front) to reform a new 42nd DAC, to which CCX BAC contributed No 1 Section.

During the rest of the month parties from the batteries were attached to 1st Division's artillery for initiation into trench warfare and to artillery and signalling training courses, while the guns went for overhaul. From 8 April 42nd (EL) division moved up to the front near Épehy in the Somme sector, which had just been abandoned by the Germans as they withdrew to the Hindenburg Line. On 22 April CXX Bde moved into Roisel with the batteries distributed around surrounding villages, under the tactical command of 59th (2nd North Midland) Division. The guns fired in support of a small operation by 59th (NM) Division against the Quarries and Cologne Farm on 27 April, and then on 30 April moved a short distance to Sainte-Émilie where 42nd (EL) Division was taking over the front line. Nevertheless, the brigade continued supporting 59th (NM) Division in its operations against Cologne Farm in early May, when It came under heavy counter-battery (CB) fire. The brigade settled into the routine of trench warfare, registering likely targets, responding to SOS calls from the infantry, and exchanging CB fire with enemy batteries. On 23 May the brigade pulled out and followed its infantry to new positions at Ruyaulcourt where CCX Bde HQ took charge of 'Left Group' of 42nd DA including D/CCXI Bty.

D (H)/CXX Bty remained at its old position at Ronssoy Wood in June and July supporting 2nd Cavalry and 35th Divisions in the continuing operations against Cologne Farm. It was finally made up to six howitzers on 23 June 1917 when a section joined from C (H) of CCCXXXII Bde, then an 'army brigade' with First Army, but originally 2/III East Lancs Bde (Bolton Artillery) with 66th (2nd East Lancashire) Division. The brigade's final organisation, therefore, was as follows:

- A Bty (1/5th Lancashire Bty + half 1/4th Lancashire Bty) – 6 × 18-pdr
- B Bty (1/6th Lancashire Bty + half 1/4th Lancashire Bty) – 6 × 18-pdr
- C Bty (1/15th Lancashire Bty + half 1/16th Lancashire Bty) – 6 × 18-pdr
- D (H) Bty (1/2nd Cumberland (H) Bty + section C (H)/CCCXXXII Bty (originally 2/2nd Cumberland (H) Bty)) – 6 × 4.5-inch

On 8 July 42nd (EL) Division was relieved by 58th (2/1st London) Division but the artillery remained at Havrincourt Wood to support the newcomers, and later 9th (Scottish) and 3rd Divisions as they successively took over the sector. Lieutenant-Col Birtwistle took command of Right Group of 3rd DA. The brigade's role was to fire concentrations into the enemy's rear areas at night, and engage enemy batteries by day. Corporal Charles Gee of B Bty distinguished himself during two of these exchanges of fire, putting out an ammunition fire in a gun pit on 22 July and rescuing a badly injured man from a collapsed dugout on 13 August.

After the infantry of 42nd (EL) Division had completed their rest period and the artillery had its guns serviced, the division went to the Ypres Salient where the Third Ypres Offensive was under way. It concentrated by rail at Poperinghe from 23 August and the infantry began training while 42nd DA went straight into the line at Potijze Chateau on 29 August. The salient was packed with guns and the 18-pdrs stood almost wheel to wheel in mud just behind the front line infantry, with the 4.5s in groups, also close to the front line. Casualties were heavy on the gun positions from enemy CB fire and among the drivers bringing ammunition up shell-swept roads at night, and several guns were damaged. From 3 September CCX Bde began firing practice barrages at strongpoints around Borry Farm, which were to be 125th (Lancashire Fusiliers) Bde's objectives when 42nd (EL) Division made its attack. The attack on 6 September was a limited operation to capture these strongpoints, but it failed, though the guns drove off German counter-attacks. The division was withdrawn to the Flanders coast on 20 September, but once again 42nd DA remained in the line, supporting V Corps's successful attack at the Battle of the Menin Road Ridge on 20 September, then moving up onto Frezenberg Ridge on 25 September to prepare for next day's Battle of Polygon Wood. The artillery engagements were intense, and it was not unusual for a battery to fire 5000 rounds in a day. The gunners suffered heavy casualties from gas shelling: in a few days the four batteries of CCX Bde lost 120 men in gas casualties alone. Two battery commanders were killed and Sergeant H. Bentley – in temporary command of A Bty, all the officers being casualties – together with Cpl Butterworth, extinguished an ammunition fire while his guns continued in action. Similarly, Sgt W.L. Breese, Cpl E. Fletcher and Driver A. Hughes of C Bty tackled a fire in a gunpit that had spread to camouflage netting and adjacent ammunition pits. After Brigadier-General F.W.H. Walshe was wounded on 29 September Lt-Col Birtwistle acted as CRA until his return on 12 October 1917. Meanwhile, CCX Bde was relieved by a New Zealand brigade on 29 September, handing over its guns in position.

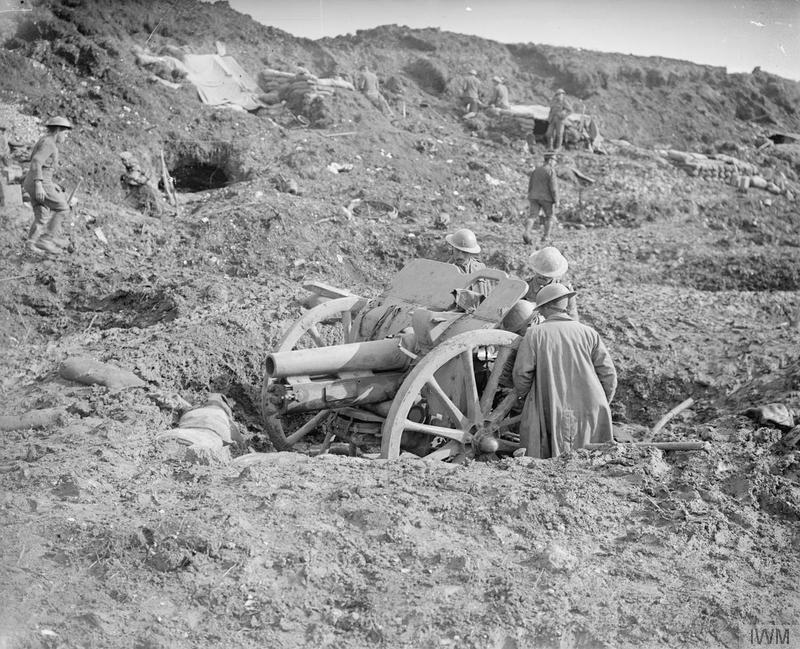
A 4.5-inch howitzer dug into a shellhole on the Western Front.

The infantry of 42nd (EL) Division had already taken over the line near Nieuport on the Flanders Coast. Earlier in the year British troops had been concentrated here for a planned thrust up the coast, but with the Ypres offensive bogged down this operation had been abandoned. However, German artillery and aircraft were very active, shelling and bombing the British gun positions and canal crossings. CCX Brigade arrived on 2 October and took over from its 2nd Line brigade in 66th (2nd East Lancashire) Divisional Artillery. When Major-General Arthur Solly-Flood took command of the 42nd Division in October he instituted an improved system of retaliatory fire, known as 'Punishment Fire'. When the Germans began a heavy bombardment while the division was being relieved by French troops on 19 November, the Punishment Fire silenced the German guns in 20 minutes.

CCX Bde pulled out on 20 November after a French artillery unit relieved it, then made a five-day march south before going into the line in the Givenchy sector on 30 November. The division remained here during the winter, carrying out normal trench duty. 42nd DA saw considerably more action than the rest of the division, and the Punishment Fire system was regularly used. The targets most likely to inconvenience the enemy were carefully registered so that when the intensity of German shelling increased, Punishment Fire could be brought down employing everything from 18-pdrs to 15-inch howitzers. On 1 December 1917 Lt-Col Birtwistle left CCX Bde on promotion to Brig-Gen as CRA of 66th (2nd East Lancashire) Division (see below). He was succeeded by Maj D.J. Mason, who had been in D (H) Bty before the war, when it was 2nd Cumberland (H) Bty; he was promoted to Lt-Col on 2 January 1918. Both Birtwistle and Mason were awarded the Distinguished Service Order (DSO) in the New Year. The brigade worked to make its command posts and telephone exchanges shell-proof, and prepared reserve positions. The biggest trench raid carried out by the division was on 11 February opposite Festubert where the raiders were protected by a Box barrage. The division was relieved on 15 February, but as usual 42nd DA stayed in place for a few days longer before coming out of the line for training near Chocques.

==== Spring Offensive ====
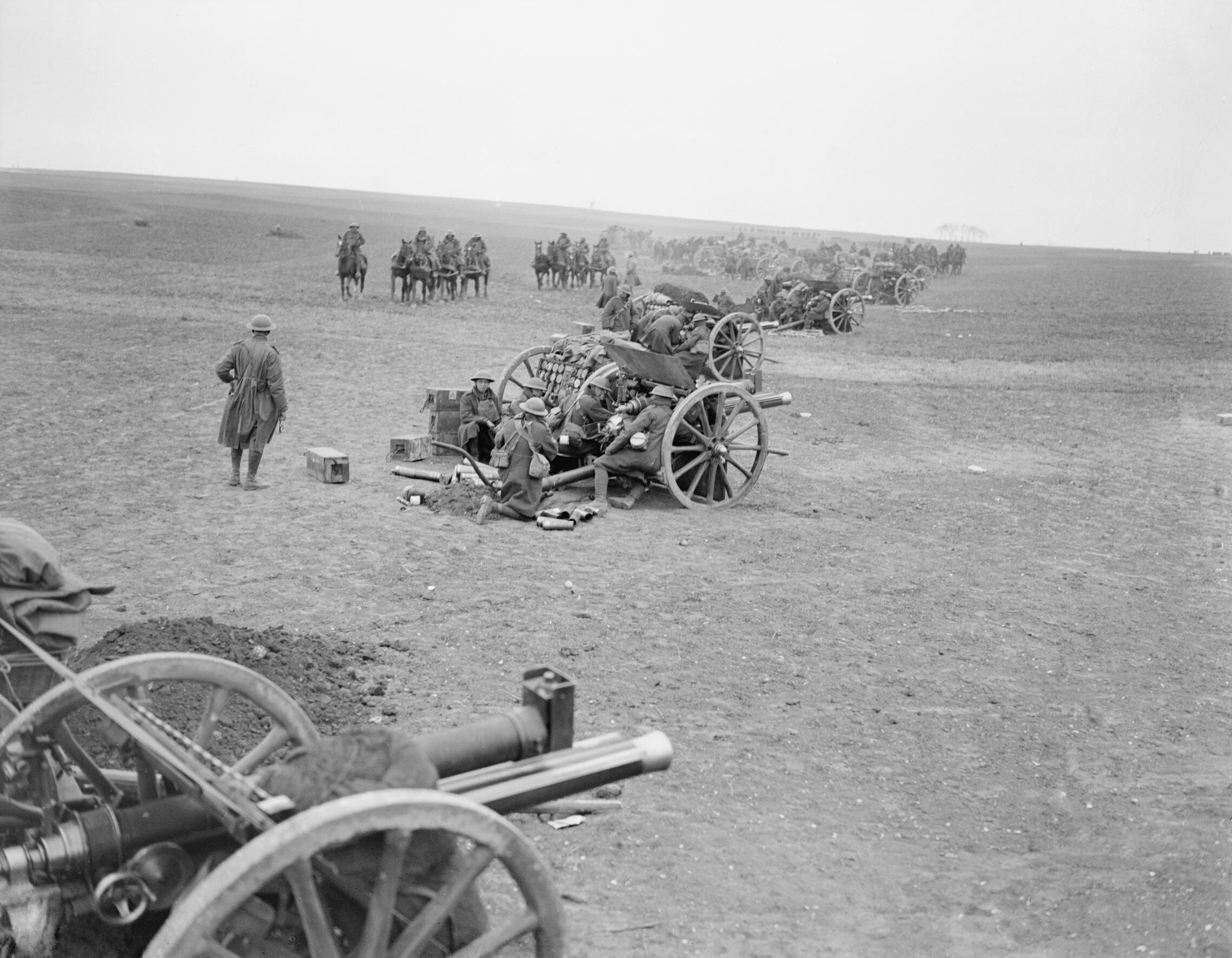
An 18-pdr battery in action in the open during the German Spring Offensive, March 1918.

42nd (EL) Division was in GHQ Reserve when the German Spring Offensive (Operation Michael) was launched on 21 March. Warning orders were immediately issued and on 23 March the division began moving south to the Somme sector. The infantry went by motor buses and arrived at Adinfer Wood on 24/25 March ahead of the artillery and transport, most which did not catch up for another two days through the crowded roads. However, CCX Bde must have kept up, because it deployed near Adinfer Wood at the same time as the infantry and came into action at dawn, the rest of 42nd DA catching up at noon. The infantry were involved in bitter fighting all day (the First Battle of Bapaume). At nightfall they were still holding the line they had taken up the previous night, but were now stretched very thinly, with both flanks 'in the air'. The artillery was ordered back to positions south of Ablainzevelle, and a few hours later to the Essarts Valley. The roads behind the front were now completely choked with retreating vehicles, and the artillery drivers bringing up ammunition suffered heavy casualties. 42nd (EL) Division's role was to screen the exhausted division behind them. During 26 March 42nd DA helped stop German attacks in front of Bucquoy and on 27 March the guns broke up two impending attacks from Ablainzevelle. On 28 March the Germans continued attacking in waves from Ablainzevelle and Logeast Wood (Operation Mars, or the First Battle of Arras of 1918), but the division held its positions; prisoners claimed that the barrage killed a whole German battalion less 40 survivors. The following day was quiet and 42nd (EL) Division was relieved on the night of 29/30 March. However, there was no rest for 42nd DA, which remained in action round Essarts, maintaining harassing fire through the night. The infantry returned to the line on 1/2 April. The Germans continued to shell the area, especially Essarts, where large numbers of gas shells were fired and 42nd DA suffered significant casualties. After this bombardment the German attack was renewed on 5 April (the Battle of the Ancre). The shelling had broken CCX Bde's communications, and the batteries could not see the infantry's SOS rockets through the gas cloud, but kept firing with those guns they could keep in action. This attack was repulsed after fierce fighting and the sector became quiet apart from artillery exchanges, and the division was relieved on 8 April. However, 42nd DA remained in the line as before, with CCX Bde under the command of 59th (NM) Division, Lt-Col Mason commanding 'Right Group'. On 14 April 42nd DA concentrated in positions near Pigeon Wood and went silent.

After a week's rest the infantry of 42nd (EL) Division returned to the line near Gommecourt. The personnel of CCX Bde joined it, taking over the guns in position (and exchanging some personnel) from the brigade it was relieving. 42nd DA spent a relatively quiet summer, reorganising the old German positions from the Battle of the Somme as up-to-date defences. The batteries were distributed in depth so that some were available in each defence zone, and the gunners were instructed in using the rifle to defend their positions. Although German artillery was active with Mustard gas shells, there was no attack. 42nd DA remained in position while the infantry were out of the line from 7 May to early June, D/CCX Bty suffering a heavy mustard gas bombardment on 11 May. When the infantry returned on 7 June the division took up a wide sector from Hébuterne to Auchonvillers. 42nd DA regularly shelled German positions in Serre and Puisieux. On 8 June CCX Bde shelled Rossignol Wood with Thermite shells in an attempt to set it on fire. The division suffered badly from the Spanish flu epidemic, and in July its frontage was reduced to match its weakened strength.

==== Hundred Days ====
Through aggressive raiding, 42nd (EL) Division pushed the German outposts back several hundred yards during the summer. After the Allies launched their counter-offensive (the Hundred Days Offensive) at the Battle of Amiens on 8 August, patrols from the division found the enemy preparing to withdraw on their front. 42nd DA pounded the German trenches and roads to disrupt this move, and follow-up patrols found the trenches 'obliterated' by the 4.5-inch howitzers. By 20 August the division had advanced beyond Serre and Puisieux. On 21 August it was ordered by IV Corps to make a full-scale attack as part of the Battle of Albert. The infantry advanced behind a Creeping barrage fired by the 18-pdrs and 4.5-inch howitzers using shrapnel and high explosive (HE) shells. Although for this attack 42nd (EL) Division was organised into brigade groups, with each RFA brigade integrated with the infantry brigade it was to support, in fact the whole of 42nd DA supported first 125th (Lancashire Fusiliers) and then 127th (Manchester) Bdes in their successive attacks, and then switched back to 125th Bde for the second objective. 42nd (EL) Division formed a protective flank to the main assault, which was partially successful. Next day the Germans attempted a dawn counter-attack on the division, but this miscarried badly, the guns were brought forward, and on 23 August the 42nd renewed its advance. It assaulted the commanding ridge north of Miraumont with the support of its own artillery and that of the New Zealand Division, and captured it without difficulty. Over the next two days it took Miraumont itself and moved on towards Warlencourt-Eaucourt. The 42nd became the reserve division on 25 August, but 63rd (Royal Naval) Division got into difficulties and 42nd DA was rushed up to assist, the gun teams of CCX and CCXI Bdes racing each other into position by Loupart Wood and coming into action immediately.

42nd (EL) Division relieved 63rd (RN) Division in the line on the night of 27/28 August, and fighting patrols followed the retiring enemy. Where significant resistance was encountered, a battalion attack was organised with a preliminary bombardment and creeping barrage laid on by 42nd DA. The biggest of these was the night attack by 10th Manchester Regiment at Riencourt-lès-Bapaume on 30 /31August. This success helped 21st Division in its attack on Beaulencourt the next day (part of the Second Battle of Bapaume), for which CCX Bde fired a barrage. 42nd (EL) Division continued pushing forward. For the attack on Villers-au-Flos on 2 September 42nd DA was reinforced by brigades from three other divisions, and C/CCX Bty also had a captured German 77mm gun in action. Because the division was starting from further back than the neighbouring New Zealanders the creeping barrage was dropped further ahead of the infantry (400 yards (370 m) instead of the usual 200–250 yards (180–230 m)) and was begun 9 minutes ahead of Zero hour; unfortunately this alerted the enemy to the attack. Nevertheless, the Manchesters captured Villers-au-Flos. That night the artillery bombarded Barastre and Haplincourt Wood in preparation for the next attack, but patrols early on 3 September found them empty and the division quickly followed up, reaching Ytres by the end of the day. It had fighting patrols across the Canal du Nord by the end of 4 September, the only hold-ups coming from destroyed roads and bridges, and incessant mustard gas shelling. 42nd (EL) Division was relieved by the New Zealand Division on the night of 5/6 September, with 42nd DA at Ytres coming under New Zealand Divisional Artillery.

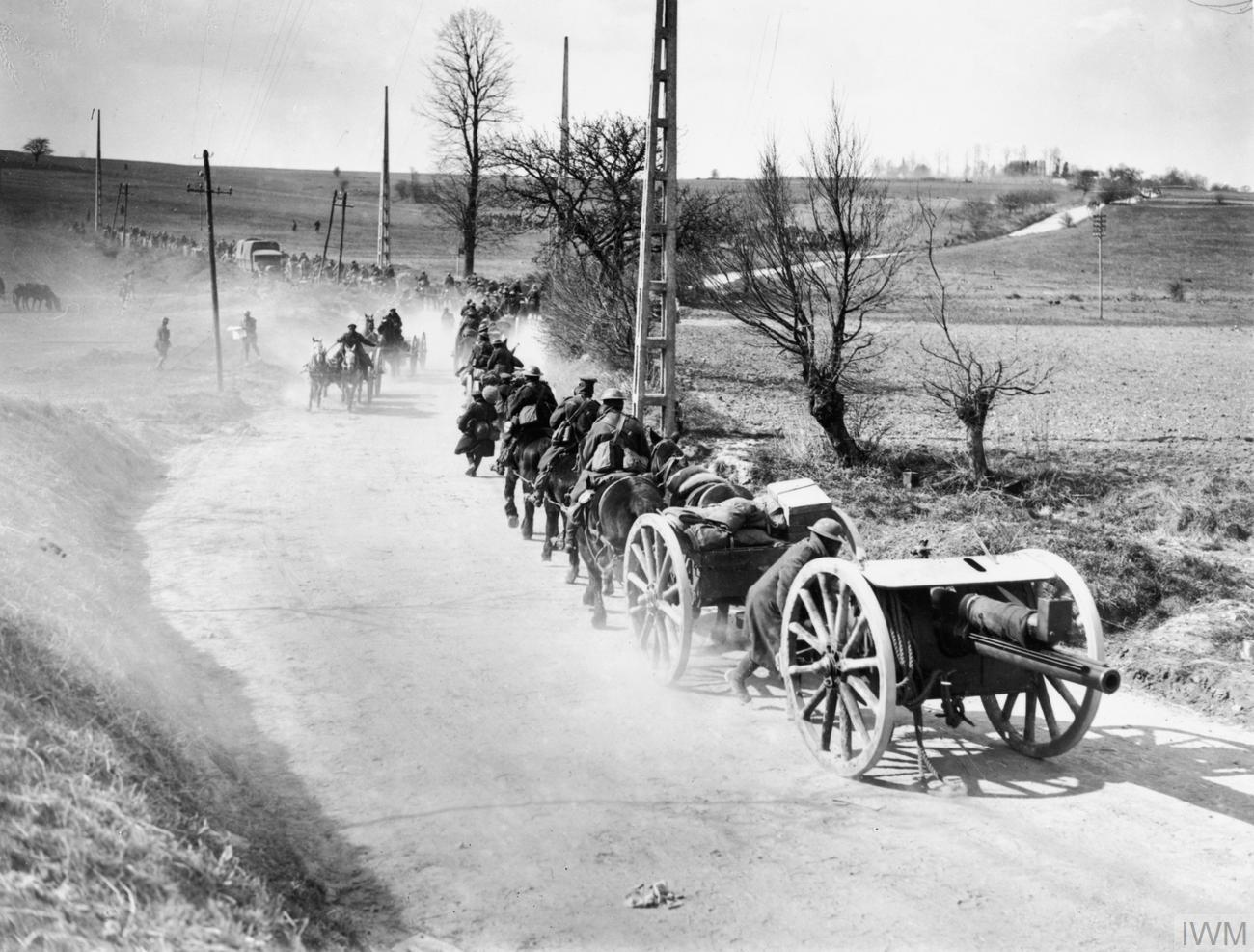
An 18-pdr battery moving up in 1918.

The Germans were now back in the Hindenburg Line, and the Allies had to clear the outposts before they could tackle the main defences. CCX Brigade suffered heavy casualties while supporting the New Zealand Division on 10–11 September. It fired a creeping barrage for the New Zealanders in the successful Battle of Havrincourt on 12 September, at the end of which a German counter-attack was broken up by artillery fire. On return to 42nd (EL) Division, the artillery brigades were given three or four days' rest before the division went back into the line east of Havrincourt on 20/21 September to prepare for the next phase of the offensive, the Battle of the Canal du Nord. The assault went in on 27 September, CCX Bde firing a creeping barrage for 125th Bde as its units went forward. Unfortunately the 7th and 8th Lancashire Fusiliers were caught by enfilade fire from the high ground around Beaucamps and by machine guns in front that had not been suppressed by the barrage: the leading companies were practically wiped out. The brigade persisted, reaching its first objective around midday, and CCX Bde fired another creeping barrage for it that evening, but the results were disappointing compared to the great victory achieved elsewhere. 5th Lancashire Fusiliers renewed the attack under moonlight behind a terrifying creeping barrage and by 06.00 on 28 September were closing on Highland Ridge, the previous day's final objective, and the enemy were withdrawing towards Welsh Ridge, which was taken later that day. For the attacks of 29–30 September the New Zealand Division passed through 42nd, and CCX moved up to continue firing creeping barrages for them.

IV Corps had now closed up to the west bank of the St Quentin Canal. On the night of 30 September/1 October the New Zealand Division established a bridgehead and attacked the following morning. Lieutenant-Col Mason was put in temporary command of 'Right Group' supporting the New Zealanders, with CXXIII Bde from 37th Division under command as well as CCX and CCXI Bdes of 42nd DA. Each brigade pushed forward a section to engage any enemy movement seen across the canal. Each battery in the group was also firing captured enemy guns and ammunition in addition to its own guns. Next day the battery commanders reconnoitred positions to cover the canal crossings and bridging sites. By 4 October there were signs of enemy withdrawals, and over the following days the brigade moved up, firing in support of the advancing New Zealanders (the Second Battle of Cambrai). On 9 October the infantry of 42nd (EL) Division relieved the New Zealanders and next day the artillery followed up to Fontaine-au-Pire. On 12 October 125th Bde took over the front including the bridgeheads that the New Zealanders had established a cross the River Selle. The Germans desperately tried to retake these bridgeheads and there was hard fighting, with CCX Bde firing at their movements. A/CCX Bty suffered two guns knocked out on 15 October by the German fire. 42nd (EL) Divisional Engineers bridged the Selle on the nights of 17–19 October, and the advance resumed at 02.00 on 20 October (the Battle of the Selle). Having moved up to Briastre, CCX Bde fired a barrage in support of the divisional attack. This was only partially successful, so while CCX Bde fired protective standing barrages, a new attack was prepared and launched at 16.00 behind a barrage containing 10 per cent smoke shells; this was completely successful. 125th Brigade attacked again on 23 October, then the New Zealanders passed through to the subsequent objectives, with CCX Bde providing a creeping barrage fired from Solesmes. At the end of the day the brigade moved forward to Romeries.

After the Battle of the Selle 42nd (EL) Division went into reserve around Beauvois; as usual 42nd DA remained in the line, with CCX Bde at Beaudignies carrying out some harassing fire, and supporting a New Zealand raid on 31 October. It then rested until 3 November when it took up positions at Ruesnes. The following day it fired two barrages for the New Zealanders' Capture of Le Quesnoy, with an advance in between. 42nd (EL) Division was then brought up to penetrate into the Forêt de Mormal. On the night of 5/6 November the brigade was ordered to follow 127th Bde to provide close support for 126th Bde's advance into the forest. The next two days' advance over terrible ground was slow, but on 8 November the division liberated Hautmont on the River Sambre and the infantry crossed the river. At 09.00 on 11 November CCX Bde moved up to Hautmont and was preparing to cross when orders arrived that the Armistice with Germany had been signed and hostilities would cease at 11.00. The brigade stood fast on the line it had reached.

42nd (EL) Division remained at Hautmont until 14 December, when it began moving to winter quarters near Charleroi in Belgium, with CCX Bde billeted in and around Montignies-sur-Sambre. Demobilisation got under way in January 1919 and CCX Brigade completed the process on 10 April 1919.

Complete casualty figures for 42nd (East Lancashire) Divisional Artillery are not available, but 1/I East Lancs Bde suffered at least 78 ORs killed, died of wounds or sickness, and CCX Bde a further 78.

=== 2/I East Lancashire Brigade, RFA ===
66th (2nd East Lancashire) Division's formation sign.

The 2nd Line units of the East Lancashire Division were raised in September and October 1914, with only a small nucleus of instructors to train the mass of volunteers. Training was slow because the 2nd Line artillery lacked guns, sights, horses, wagons and signal equipment. The 2nd East Lancashire Division, now numbered 66th (2nd EL) Division, began concentrating in Kent and Sussex in August 1915. 2/I East Lancs Bde was given four old French De Bange 90 mm guns for training, and it was not until 11–16 December that it received its 18-pdrs. In early 1916 the division moved into the East Coast defences, with its artillery at Colchester.

In May 1916 the brigade was numbered as CCCXXX (330) Brigade and the batteries designated A, B and C. After long delays caused by having to find reinforcement drafts for 42nd (EL) Division (supplying one draft of 250 gunners in 1916 considerably delayed the whole division), 66th (2nd EL) Division was finally ready for overseas service at the end of 1916. Before leaving England the brigade's batteries were made up to 6 guns each and 550 (H) Bty of 4 × 4.5s joined to become D (H) Bty. (Note: 550 (H) Bty had been formed earlier in the year from conscripts as 526 (H) Bty, but that number had been taken by 2/1 Cumberland (H) Bty.) Shortly after arriving in France in March 1917 R Sec of C (H)/CCLXXXVII Bde (originally 2/III West Lancashire Bde) arrived from 57th (2nd West Lancashire) Division to make D (H) up to six howitzers, giving the final organisation of the brigade:

- A Bty (2/4th Lancashire Bty) – 6 × 18-pdr
- B Bty (2/5th Lancashire Bty) – 6 × 18-pdr
- C Bty (2/6th Lancashire Bty) – 6 × 18-pdr
- D (H) Bty (550th (H) Bty + half C (H)/CCLXXXVII Bty) – 6 × 4.5-inch

66th (2nd EL) Division was ordered to France on 11 February 1917 and CCCXXX Bde entrained on 2 March, requiring eight trains for the journey from Colchester to Southampton

The division concentrated at St Venant under First Army and CCCXXX Bde's batteries reinforced those of 5th Division to learn the frontline routines, afterwards relieving them. The artillery covered a number of trench raids by the division, but otherwise the front was quiet. In July the division moved to Nieuport for the planned operation on the Flanders coast (see above). However, the Germans launched a spoiling attack, and the expected breakthrough at the Third Battle of Ypres failed to materialise, so the operation was cancelled. 66th (2nd EL) Division was relieved by 42nd (EL) Division in October (CCCXXX Bde being relieved by its 1st Line units, see above) and was sent to the Ypres Salient. The mud on the Passchendaele ridge was so bad that the batteries could not all get up to their intended positions: only 25 of CCCXXX Bde's guns got into action on 8 October, to support the division's attack next day (the Battle of Poelcappelle). Without cover they were in full view of the enemy, although they received little fire and casualties were light. The barrage was weak, and shells buried in the mud did no damage. The division's attack, in heavy rain, made limited progress.

After the infantry of 66th (2nd EL) Division were relieved on 11 October, the guns remained in position and some were pushed further forward. They were regularly under fire, and the ammunition had to be brought up by pack-horses. CCCXXX Brigade supported the attacks by II ANZAC Corps on 12 October (the First Battle of Passchendaele) and Canadian Corps on 26 October (the Second Battle of Passchendaele). The gunners were finally relieved by 2nd Canadian Division, who took over their guns in position on 27 October. 66th Divisional Artillery then rallied at the waggon lines, taking over the Canadian guns, and marched to rest billets at Le Doulieu on 31 October. It went back into the line on 11 November, relieving Australian gunners. The final attack on Passchendaele had been made the previous day, but the guns remained under shell and gas attack. The division's CRA was killed on 24 November and Lt-Col Laird of CCCXXX Bde took over temporarily until Brig-Gen Birtwistle arrived from 42nd (EL) Division to take over (see above).

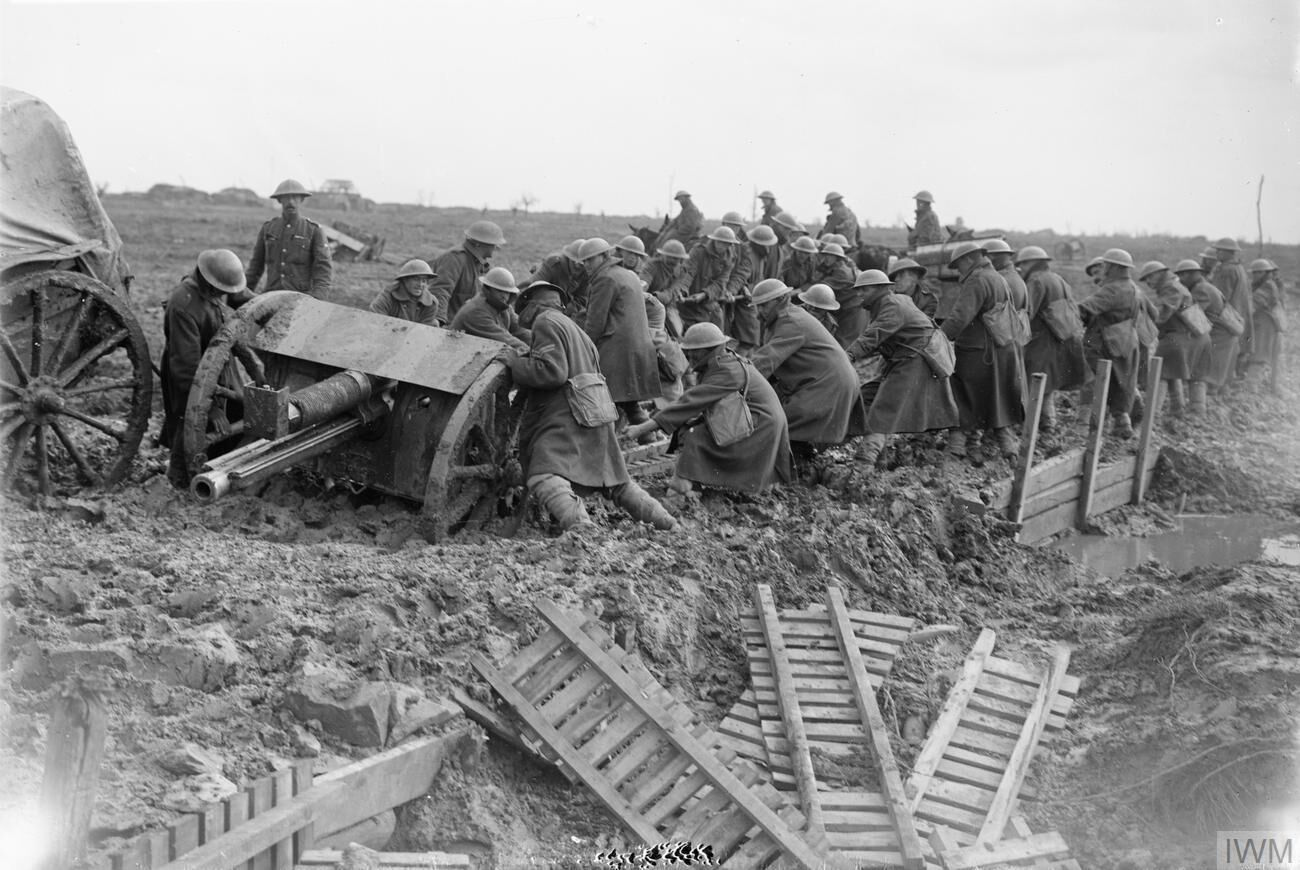
Hauling an 18-pdr out of mud, 16 October 1917.

66th Divisional Artillery remained in the line at Ypres during the winter, finally reverting to the command of its parent division when that returned to the sector on 13 January 1918. The division moved south by rail in mid-February, with CCCXXX Bde established at Cayeux-en-Santerre, where it carried out intensive training. In early March it moved to Hervilly, behind 66th (2nd EL) Division's defences. These consisted of an Outpost Zone (the Blue Line) along Cologne Ridge, and a Battle Zone behind as the position of main resistance, with the Red Line in front and the Brown Line at the rear; the final line of resistance was the Green Line. The guns were disposed in depth through these zones, with fall-back positions prepared. B Battery was in the most forward position and came under frequent enemy fire. Some 18-pdrs (one each from A and B Btys) were given an anti-tank role in anticipation of the Germans using them. The long-anticipated German Spring Offensive began at 04.30 on the morning of 21 March with a 6-hour heavy bombardment of the division's gun positions, which also cut the telephone lines and prevented runners getting through with messages. There was a heavy mist and Germans troops were able to penetrate the Blue Line before the artillery OPs could see them. However, the batteries fired their SOS tasks on their own initiative. 66th (2nd EL) Division defended its Red Line stubbornly. During the afternoon the enemy advance forced A Bty to destroy its guns and withdraw (the outlying anti-tank gun crew being captured), while Brigade HQ moved back to Divisional HQ at Nobescourt Farm. B Battery got back to the Templeux-le-Guérard quarries 400–600 yards (370–550 m) behind the Red Line; the officer commanding, Maj William Cunliffe, got four guns behind a bank near Brose Wood, with the other two off to the left. It kept its guns in action in support of the defence by 2/7th Manchester Regiment in Brose Wood, firing shrapnel against the advancing enemy until 18.30, when the gunners took to their rifles and Lewis guns to defend their gun pits. They were finally overrun: Maj Cunliffe, five officers and about 63 other ranks were taken prisoner. Cunliffe was later awarded the Military Cross for the gallant stand. Although 66th (2nd EL) Division still held some of its Battle Zone positions at the end of the day, its casualties were heavy, and it was outflanked following the collapse of the neighbouring division to the north. C and D Batteries withdrew under cover of darkness to their prepared positions in the Brown Line.

Next day the Germans again attacked under cover of mist, and were through the Brown Line by midday. The division withdrew towards the Green Line. By now some reinforcements had arrived, including 50th (Northumbrian) Division, which manned the Green Line as the 66th passed through. Lieutenant-Col Laird was now given command of 'Left Group' of field artillery covering the left half of XIX Corps, consisting of what remained of 66th DA (his own C and D Btys, with a combined A/B and D Btys of CCCXXXI Bde), G and H Btys Royal Horse Artillery from 3rd Cavalry Division, and XLVII Bde RFA from 14th (Light) Division, which was covering a brigade of 50th (Northumbrian) Division. That night the surviving units of XIX Corps, slipped away from the meagre defences of the Green Line and joined the 'Great Retreat' towards the Somme Canal. The heavy artillery and transport began crossing the canal next morning, with Laird's group coming into action at Cartigny and then Le Mesnil to support the infantry rearguards before crossing itself and taking up positions at Barleux. On 26 March the Germans forced their way across the canal and the retreat was resumed. D Battery suffered heavy casualties on 27 March, but A Bty had been re-equipped with guns and came back into action. On 28 March 66th DA crossed the River Somme. Here the division's infantry were relieved, but 66th DA under Laird fired in support of 'Carey's Force', a scratch force of engineers that held the line at Villers-Bretonneux, where the retreat ended on 29 March.

66th (2nd East Lancashire) Division disappeared from the war for many months, its surviving infantry units becoming training cadres for newly arrived American troops, but 66th DA continued as an independent artillery force. By now XIX Corps had assigned its available field artillery to cover particular sectors, regardless of the formation to which they belonged. During the Battle of the Avre (4–5 April) 66th DA around Villers-Bretonneux supported 18th (Eastern) Division, CCCXXX Bde suffering further casualties. By now it consisted of three four-gun batteries. Still under heavy fire, 6th DA was relieved on the night of 7/8 April. Between 21 March and 13 April CCCXXX Bde had suffered casualties of 1 officer and 16 ORs killed, 6 officers and 51 ORs wounded, and 8 officers and 65 ORs missing (mainly Prisoners of war).

On 16 April 66th DA was sent north by train to Second Army which was fighting the Battle of the Lys. From 20 April it provided a composite brigade under CCCXXX Bde HQ to support 36th (Ulster) Division, which was in action until 26 April. 66th DA then concentrated in the Proven area to reorganise, with the batteries returning to their own brigades. With no infantry to support, the trench mortar batteries and the Small Arms Ammunition Section of the Divisional Ammunition Column were disbanded, releasing gunners and drivers to reinforce the gun batteries. By the end of the month all the batteries were back to their six-gun strength. From 14/15 to 22 May 66th DA was in action near Busseboom supporting counter-attacks by the 14th French Division, and in June and early July it covered small operations by various formations in Second Army. XIX Corps HQ then moved into the area and assigned 66th DA to support 27th US Division under training in the 2nd Position, which had no artillery of its own. After a short spell in the front line when CCCXXX Bde reinforced 41st Division for an operation near Kemmel, 66th DA joined 30th US Division.

The Allied Hundred Days Offensive was now under way, and 66th DA's batteries began moving forward on 1 September, supporting various divisions advancing on the Lys. From 12 September to 1 October CCCXXX Bde was lent to 31st Division for the Fifth Battle of Ypres. By 18 October 66th DA had advanced as far as Armentières, where it was relieved. It went back in to the line on 27 October supporting XIII Corps in the Battle of the Sambre. By now 66th (2nd EL) Division had been reformed as a fighting division and had fought at the battles of Cambrai and the Selle, covered by the artillery of other formations. 66th DA was transferred back to it on 8 November in the closing stages of the war, when the division was organised into all-arms columns pursuing the defeated Germans until hostilities ended on 11 November.

Initially, 66th (2nd EL) Division was selected to form part of the Army of Occupation, and began its march to the Rhine on 18 November. However, the march was halted on 1 December, when CCCXXX Bde had reached Villers-le-Gambon. On 14 December the division went into winter quarters around Ciney in Belgium while other formations went to form British Army of the Rhine. CCCXXX Brigade remained billeted at Leignon while demobilisation began. This process was completed on 17 May 1919 when the brigade was disbanded.

== Interwar ==
When the TF was reconstituted on 7 February 1920, I East Lancs Bde reformed at Church with 13 and 14 Lancashire Btys and 15 and 16 Cumberland Btys (the former IV East Lancs Bde (Cumberland Artillery) having been broken up during the war). In 1921 the TF was reorganised as the Territorial Army (TA) and the unit was redesignated as 51st (East Lancashire & Cumberland) Brigade, RFA, making it the senior TA brigade. Headquarters was at the Drill Hall, Moscow Mill Street, Church, and the batteries were numbered 201 to 204. However, in June 1922 it was redesignated 93rd (East Lancashire) Brigade with 201 and 202 Lancashire Btys, while the two Cumberland batteries left to join the 93rd (Westmorland and Cumberland Yeomanry) Brigade and form a new 51st (Westmorland and Cumberland) Brigade. The new 51st remained part of 42nd Divisional Artillery while the new 93rd became a two-battery 'army brigade' in 42nd (East Lancashire) Divisional Area with the following organisation:

- HQ at 50 King Street, Blackburn
- 201 (East Lancashire) Bty at Artillery Drill Hall, Church
- 202 (East Lancashire) Bty at Burnley Barracks, Burnley
- 222 Field Artillery Signal Section, at Blackburn – attached from 42nd (East Lancashire) Divisional Signals, Royal Corps of Signals

In 1924 the RFA was subsumed into the Royal Artillery (RA), and the word 'Field' was inserted into the titles of its brigades and batteries.

=== Anti-aircraft conversion ===
During the 1930s the increasing need for anti-aircraft (AA) defence for Britain's cities was addressed by converting a number of TA artillery units to this role. In November 1938, the RA replaced its designation of 'brigade' for a lieutenant-colonel's command by the more modern 'regiment'; the unit was due to become the 93rd (East Lancashire) Field Regiment, but on 28 November it became the 52nd (East Lancashire) Light Anti-Aircraft Regiment under Lt-Col C.H. Mather:

- Regimental HQ (RHQ) at Burnley Barracks
- 154 (E. Lancs) LAA Bty at Artillery Drill Hall, Church – from 201 Bty
- 155 (E. Lancs) LAA Bty at Burnley Barracks – from 202 Bty
- 156 LAA Bty at Clitheroe – new unit

At this stage Light AA (LAA) units were armed with Light machine guns (AALMGs), usually old Lewis guns, but the new Bofors 40 mm gun was on order. After the Munich Crisis in 1938, the TA was doubled in size, and the 52nd formed a duplicate unit at Oswaldtwistle in July 1939, the 56th Light Anti-Aircraft Regiment (it received its 'East Lancashire' subtitle in February 1942), with RHQ and 166–8 LAA Btys.

== Second World War ==
On the outbreak of war on 3 September 1939, both regiments mobilised in Western Command but were not yet assigned to any formation.

=== 52nd (East Lancashire) LAA Regiment ===
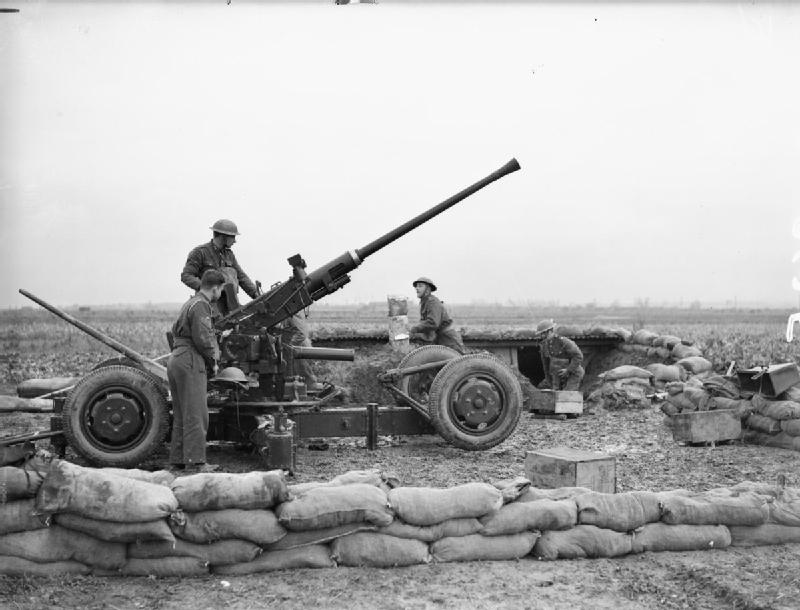
Bofors gun in France, 13 November 1939

52nd (East Lancashire) LAA Rgt crossed to France under Lt-Col Mather in November 1939 as part of the British Expeditionary Force (BEF). During the Battle of France and subsequent retreat to Dunkirk the regiment was credited with an extraordinary number of 'kills'. As the Dunkirk evacuation progressed the regiment was deployed on the beaches to cover the shrinking 'pocket' until its turn to destroy its remaining equipment and escape in small boats.

After its return from France 52nd (EL) LAA Rgt was re-equipped and then was one of the first AA units sent to reinforce British forces in Egypt. When Italy invaded Greece British troops were sent to help, including 154 (EL) LAA Bty, which was allocated to defending airfields, while RHQ and 156 LAA Bty were sent to help defend Crete. 155 (EL) LAA Bty was attached to 13th LAA Rgt in the Western Desert; in February 1941 it also went to Greece, joining 'W Force' of Commonwealth troops in a defensive line along the River Aliakmon. The Germans launched their own invasion of Greece with considerable air superiority on 6 April, and W Force was soon engaged in a fighting retreat to the south coast, where most of 155 LAA Bty was evacuated. 154 LAA Bty was overrun by German paratroops on 26 April while defending the bridge over the Corinth Canal and only a few AA gunners got away from this battle. The Germans then turned their attention to an invasion of Crete. Lieutenant-Col Mather with RHQ of 52nd (EL) LAA Rgt was in charge of a mixed force of heavy and light AA units in the Suda–Canea area, while most of his own 156 LAA Bty was guarding Maleme airfield with a detachment at Heraklion. The German assault by paratroops and glider troops was launched on 20 May after air raids to suppress the AA defences. Maleme airfield was one of the Germans' principal objectives and 156 LAA Bty used Bofors and small arms against low-flying fighter-bombers and then against the transport aircraft and gliders. The battery suffered severely, but the airfield was held until the following afternoon, when the Germans began landing directly onto the airfield under fire. By 26 May the situation was untenable and the remaining troops began withdrawing to the south of the island for evacuation: part of 156 LAA Bty fought their way out of Suda after using their Bofors as field guns. Most of the Heraklion force also got away.

After their heavy casualties 154 and 156 LAA Btys were officially disbanded on 1 July 1941. RHQ of 52nd (EL) LAA Rgt reformed in Egypt and was later joined by 100 and 195 LAA Btys. For the next two years, while Eighth Army fought the Western Desert campaign, the regiment defended the vital Suez Canal and its ports against bombing and Parachute mines. After the victory at the Second Battle of El Alamein part of the regiment moved into Libya to cover Eighth Army's lines of communication.

52nd (EL) LAA Regiment joined 12 AA Brigade for the invasion of Italy at Salerno (Operation Avalanche). Disembarking on 15 September, six days after the assault landings, the gunners immediately found themselves formed into an extemporised infantry unit ('Gunnerforce') to prevent Germans troops infiltrating into the beachhead. After four more days the battle of the beachhead was over and the Allied troops quickly captured Naples. 12 AA Brigade was sent to defend the port, and then moved up to support the crossing of the River Volturno. After months facing the German Winter Line, operations restarted with the crossing of the Garigliano, the preliminary phase of the Battle of Monte Cassino, after which 12 AA Bde defended the bridges. The renewed attack on Cassino began on the night of 11/12 May. 12 AA Brigade's LAA regiments were committed to defending bridges, defiles, assembly areas and artillery positions, and enemy aircraft were active in low-level strafing and bombing. After the capture of Rome in early June, the Germans pulled back to the Gothic Line.

12 AA Brigade and its units were transferred to Eighth Army on the Adriatic front, supporting the slow advance to the Gothic Line. Early in 1945 Eighth Army began preparing for its Spring offensive Operation Grapeshot. Attacks by the Luftwaffe were now rare, and the AA guns were primarily used for ground firing, the Bofors proving useful in hitting pinpoint targets. All of 52nd LAA guns were deployed in this way with the frontline divisions, targeting enemy mortar and sniper positions, road junctions and buildings, or working parties. The Bofors guns had to be sited well forward and they remained in these positions when the rest of the troops with withdrawn for safety during the opening heavy bomber programme, meaning that they were the most advanced troops when the attack was launched on 9 April. The LAA units were left behind once Eighth Army was through the Argenta Gap, and 12 AA Bde was given the responsibility for protecting the pontoon bridge built across the River Po. It had advanced as far as Ferrara where it was ordered to stand down on 1 May; hostilities on the Italian front ended with the Surrender of Caserta the following day. Immediately, the brigade formed a transport column to bring up supplies for the army and to collect Prisoners of War (PoWs). The AA units settled down to traffic control and guarding installations and PoWs while awaiting demobilisation.

52nd (East Lancashire) LAA Regiment with 100, 155 (East Lancs) and 195 LAA Btys entered suspended animation on 7 November 1945.

=== 56th (East Lancashire) LAA Regiment ===
During its training in Yorkshire 56th (East Lancashire) LAA Rgt came under the command of 39 AA Brigade. The regiment was intended to join the BEF in France but was diverted with 6 AA Bde to Norway after the German invasion in April 1940. Its batteries operated separately at Harstad, Namsos and Åndalsnes, each of these operations ending in evacuation.

On its return from Norway 56th LAA Rgt was re-equipped and then joined the recently formed 8th Armoured Division. The division embarked for the Middle East in May 1942, but was broken up shortly after its arrival in Egypt: its armoured brigades were stripped away to act independently, each accompanied with a battery from 56th LAA Rgt, while the divisional HQ RA (with RHQ and two Troops of 56th (EL) LAA Rgt) was designated 'Hammerforce' and assigned a role under 1st Armoured Division for the Second Battle of El Alamein. 8th Armoured Division clearly had no future as a fighting formation, and 56th (EL) LAA Rgt left it after Alamein. As Eighth Army advanced rapidly towards Tripoli, the AA units spread out behind, defending the captured ports and landing grounds (LGs), and the lengthening lines of communication. After the capture of Tripoli 56th (EL) LAA Rgt passed to the command of 12 AA Bde, whose role was to move up behind Eighth Army's advance and defend the Desert Air Force's LGs as they came into use, with batteries working under the command of the DAF tactical wing to which they were allocated.

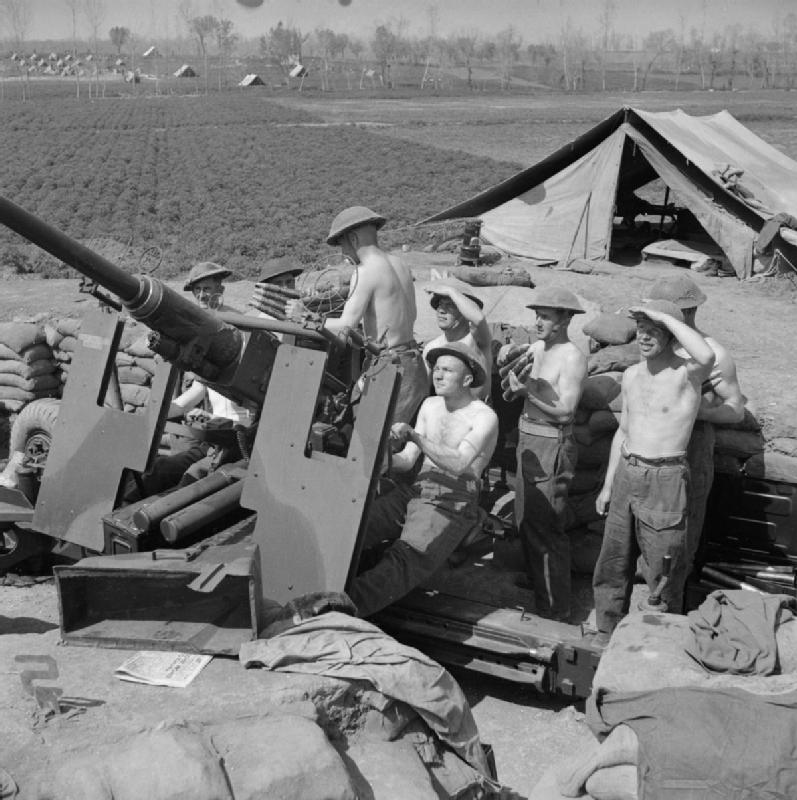
A Bofors gun crew in Italy, April 1944.

After the North African Campaign ended with the capture of Tunis in May 1943, 56th (EL) LAA Rgt was assigned as X Corps' LAA regiment, training for Operation Avalanche (see above). X Corps' troops landed when the beachhead was sufficiently expanded, and the regiment supported its advance to Naples, the Volturno, and the Winter Line. To outflank the Monte Cassino position, Fifth US Army carried out a landing on the coast further north at landing at Anzio in January 1944. The beachhead came under severe attack, and 168 LAA Bty was sent to reinforce the AA defences. After months of fighting the Allies broke through at Monte Cassino and Anzio in May, and Fifth US Army captured Rome in July.

Corps LAA regiments were abolished in June 1944 and 56th (EL) LAA Rgt joined first 8 AA Bde and then 62 AA Bde protecting the new US airfields in the Tiber plain. Fifth US Army had been slowly pounding away at the Gothic Line. In December the Germans launched a counter-attack (the Battle of Garfagnana) between Lucca and Pistoia to retake Livorno, and 56th (EL) LAA Rgt was used in an anti-tank role equipped with US M10 tank destroyers mounting 3-inch guns.

By late 1944, the Luftwaffe was suffering from such shortages of pilots, aircraft and fuel that serious air attacks could be discounted and cuts could be made in AA units to address the British reinforcement crisis. 56th (East Lancashire) LAA Regiment left 62 AA Bde in February 1945 and together with 166, 167 and 168 LAA Btys entered suspended animation on 6 March 1945.

== Postwar ==
AA Command's formation sign.

The TA was reconstituted on 1 January 1947, and both regiments were reformed, the 52nd as 293 (East Lancashire) LAA Rgt at Burnley and 56th as 556 (East Lancashire) Heavy AA Rgt at Manchester. Both were in 70 Anti-Aircraft Brigade of AA Command, based at Salford.

AA Command was disbanded on 10 March 1955 and there were wholesale mergers among its units. Both regiments were merged into 380 (King's Own) Light Regiment (a light field regiment rather than AA), forming P (Church) and Q (Burnley) Btys. When there were further reductions in the TA on 1 May 1961, the King's Own part of the regiment reverted to infantry in the King's Own Royal Regiment (Lancaster), while the two former East Lancs Artillery batteries, P and Q, amalgamated into 288 (2nd West Lancashire) LAA Rgt as Q (East Lancashire) Bty. However, when the TA was reduced into the Territorial and Army Volunteer Reserve (TAVR) in 1967, this regiment also became part of the King's Own, ending the artillery lineage.

== Honorary Colonels ==
The following served as Honorary Colonels of the brigade:

- Robert R Jackson, appointed 24 October 1861
- W.J. Thom, VD, former CO, appointed 7 January 1903
- Ughtred, 1st Lord Shuttleworth, appointed 12 August 1910; continued in the role with 51st (Lancashire & Cumberland) and then 93rd (E. Lancs) brigades into the 1930s
- Maj-Gen Sir Horace de Courcy Martelli, KBE, CB, DSO, former CRA 42nd (EL) Division, appointed 12 August 1937
