= Croix-Caluyau =

- Commune
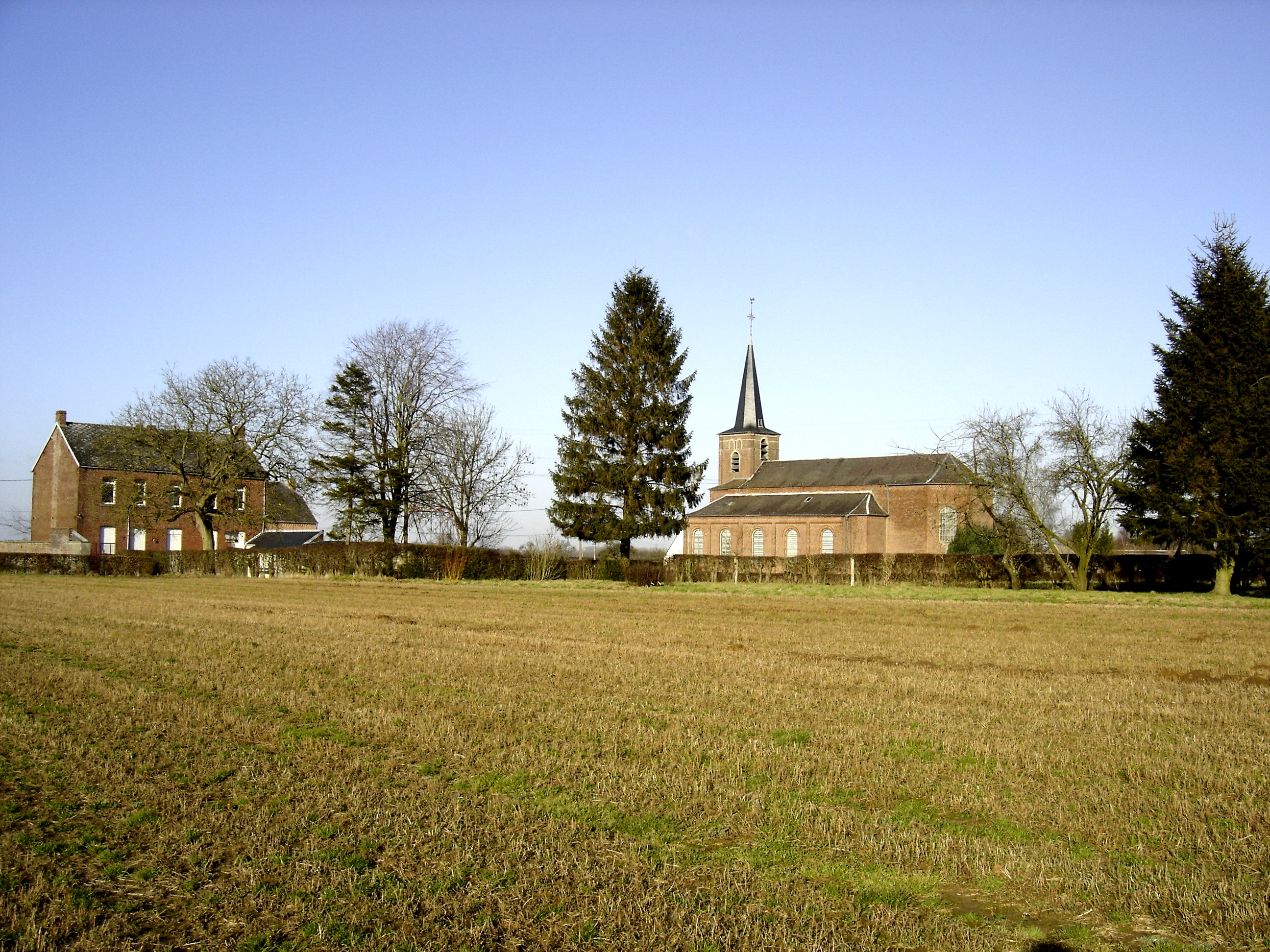
- Church and school

- Coat of arms
- Location of Croix-Caluyau
- Location within France Location within Hauts-de-France
- Coordinates: 50°08′52″N 3°34′54″E
- Country: France
- Region: Hauts-de-France
- Department: Nord
- Arrondissement: Avesnes-sur-Helpe
- Canton: Avesnes-sur-Helpe
- Intercommunality: CC Pays de Mormal

Government
  - Mayor (2020–2026): Jean-Marie Cousin
- Area^{1}: 4.01 km^{2} (1.55 sq mi)
- Elevation: 134 m (440 ft)
- Highest elevation: 151 m (495 ft)
- Lowest elevation: 128 m (420 ft)
- Population (2023): 238
  - Density: 59.4/km^{2} (154/sq mi)
- Time zone: UTC+01:00 (CET)
  - Summer (DST): UTC+02:00 (CEST)
- INSEE/Postal code: 59164 /59222
- ^{1} French Land Register data, which excludes lakes, ponds, glaciers > 1 km^{2} (0.386 sq mi or 247 acres) and river estuaries.

Croix-Caluyau (French pronunciation: [kʁwa kalɥijo]) is a commune in the Nord department in northern France.

== Heraldry ==
Arms of Croix-Caluyau	The arms of Croix-Caluyau are blazoned : Sable, 3 crosses couped Or.

== See also ==
- Communes of the Nord department
