= Taisnières-en-Thiérache =

- Commune
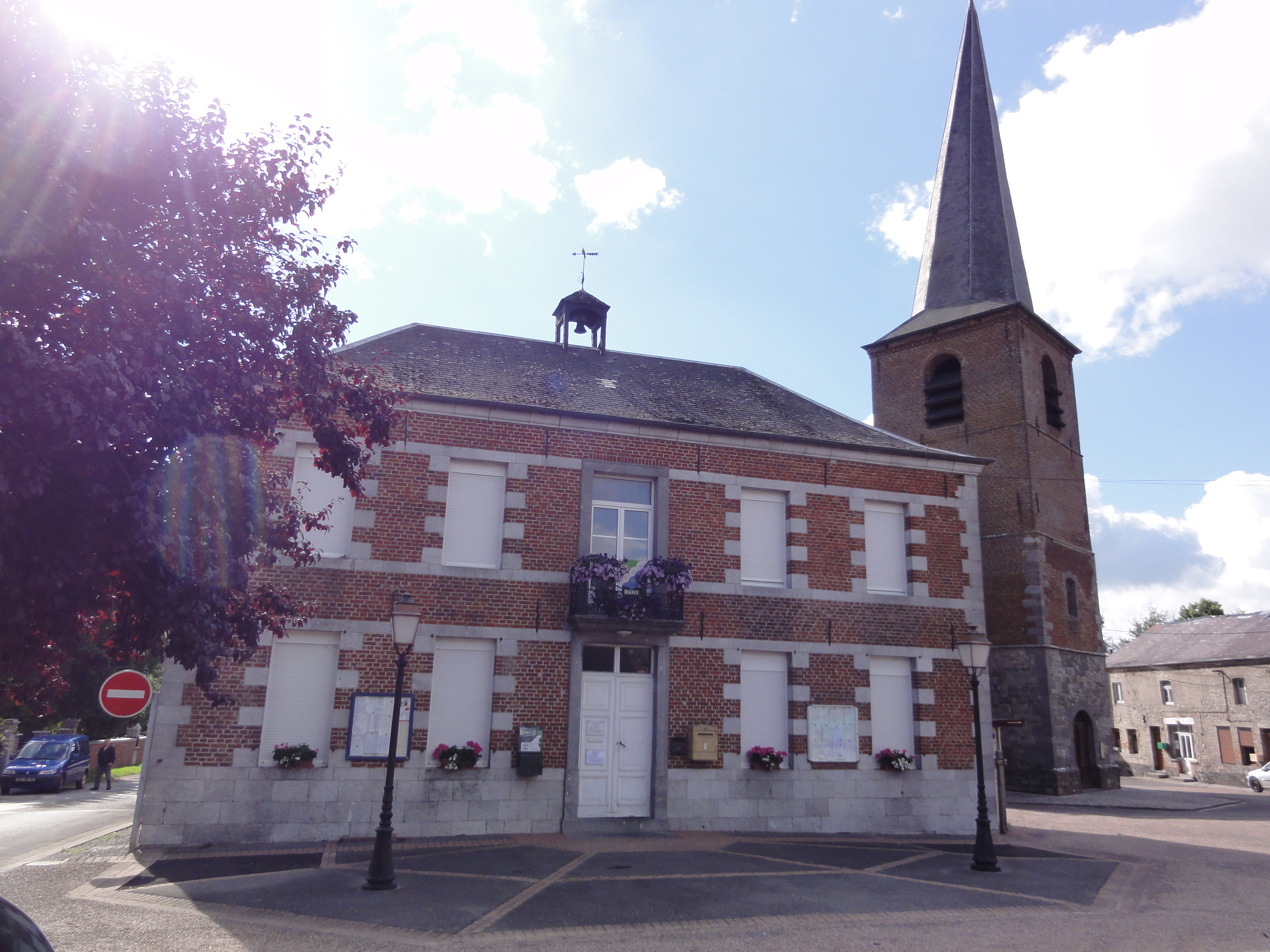
- The town hall in Taisnières-en-Thiérache

- Coat of arms
- Location of Taisnières-en-Thiérache
- Location within France Location within Hauts-de-France
- Coordinates: 50°08′48″N 3°48′51″E
- Country: France
- Region: Hauts-de-France
- Department: Nord
- Arrondissement: Avesnes-sur-Helpe
- Canton: Avesnes-sur-Helpe
- Intercommunality: CC Cœur de l'Avesnois

Government
  - Mayor (2020–2026): Claude Connart
- Area^{1}: 8.5 km^{2} (3.3 sq mi)
- Elevation: 140 m (460 ft)
- Highest elevation: 191 m (627 ft)
- Lowest elevation: 131 m (430 ft)
- Population (2023): 475
  - Density: 56/km^{2} (140/sq mi)
- Time zone: UTC+01:00 (CET)
  - Summer (DST): UTC+02:00 (CEST)
- INSEE/Postal code: 59583 /59550
- ^{1} French Land Register data, which excludes lakes, ponds, glaciers > 1 km^{2} (0.386 sq mi or 247 acres) and river estuaries.

Taisnières-en-Thiérache (French pronunciation: [tɛnjɛʁ ɑ̃ tjeʁaʃ], literally Taisnières in Thiérache) is a commune in the Nord department in northern France.

== Heraldry ==
Arms of Taisnières-en-Thiérache	The arms of Taisnières-en-Thiérache are blazoned : Per bend sinister vert and azure, on a bend sinister wavy argent between a bell tranfixed by a crozier and in base 2 wheels Or, the letters P, D and V gules.

== See also ==
- Communes of the Nord department
