= Forest-en-Cambrésis =

- Commune
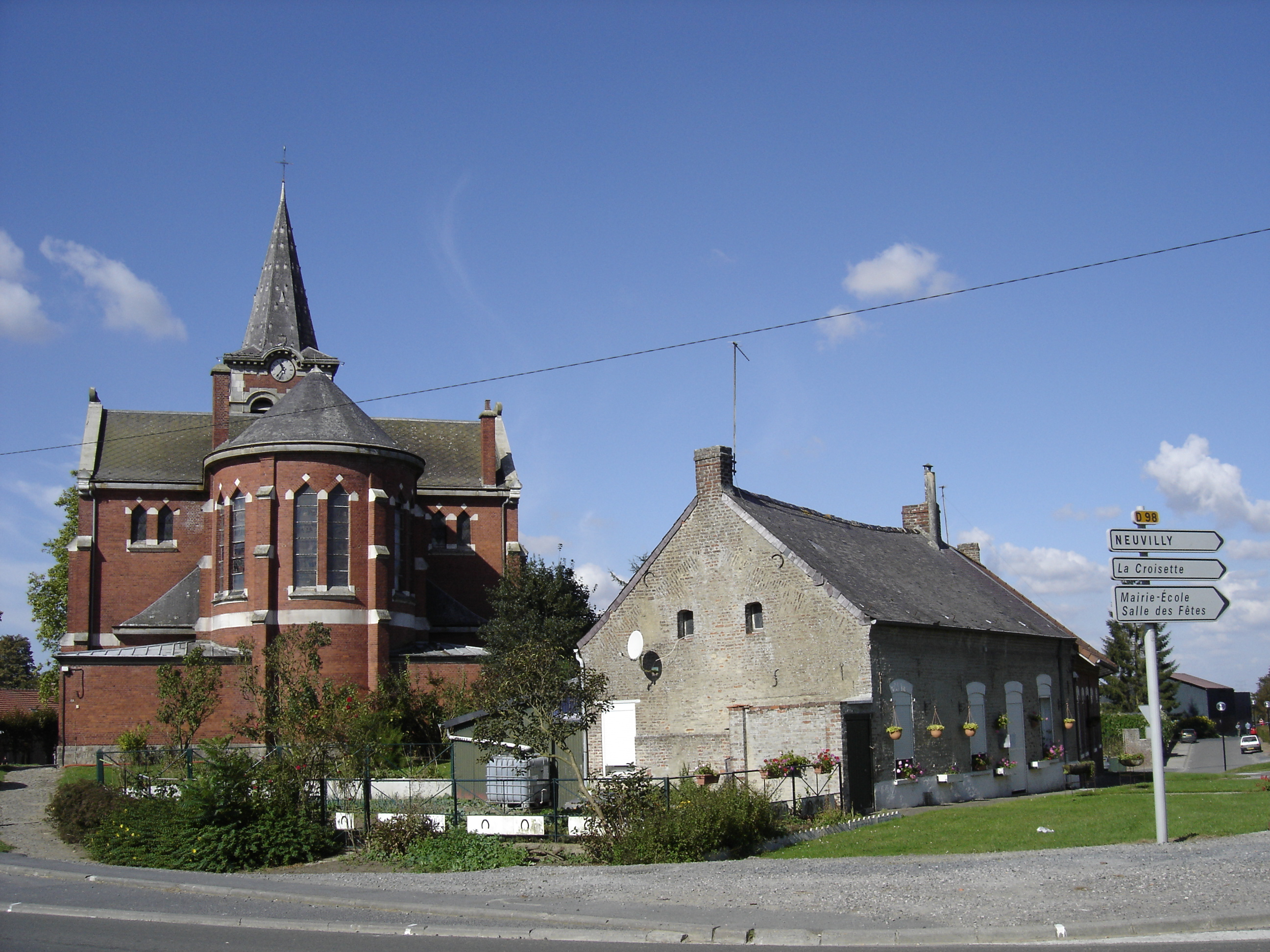
- The church in Forest-en-Cambrésis

- Coat of arms
- Location of Forest-en-Cambrésis
- Location within France Location within Hauts-de-France
- Coordinates: 50°08′30″N 3°34′20″E
- Country: France
- Region: Hauts-de-France
- Department: Nord
- Arrondissement: Avesnes-sur-Helpe
- Canton: Avesnes-sur-Helpe
- Intercommunality: Pays de Mormal

Government
  - Mayor (2020–2026): Maurice Saniez
- Area^{1}: 8.87 km^{2} (3.42 sq mi)
- Highest elevation: 154 m (505 ft)
- Lowest elevation: 89 m (292 ft)
- Population (2023): 549
  - Density: 61.9/km^{2} (160/sq mi)
- Time zone: UTC+01:00 (CET)
  - Summer (DST): UTC+02:00 (CEST)
- INSEE/Postal code: 59246 /59222
- ^{1} French Land Register data, which excludes lakes, ponds, glaciers > 1 km^{2} (0.386 sq mi or 247 acres) and river estuaries.

Forest-en-Cambrésis is a commune in the Nord department in northern France.

== Heraldry ==
Arms of Forest-en-Cambrésis	The arms of Forest-en-Cambrésis are blazoned : Argent, 3 crescents sable.

== See also ==
- Communes of the Nord department
