= Hecq =

- Commune
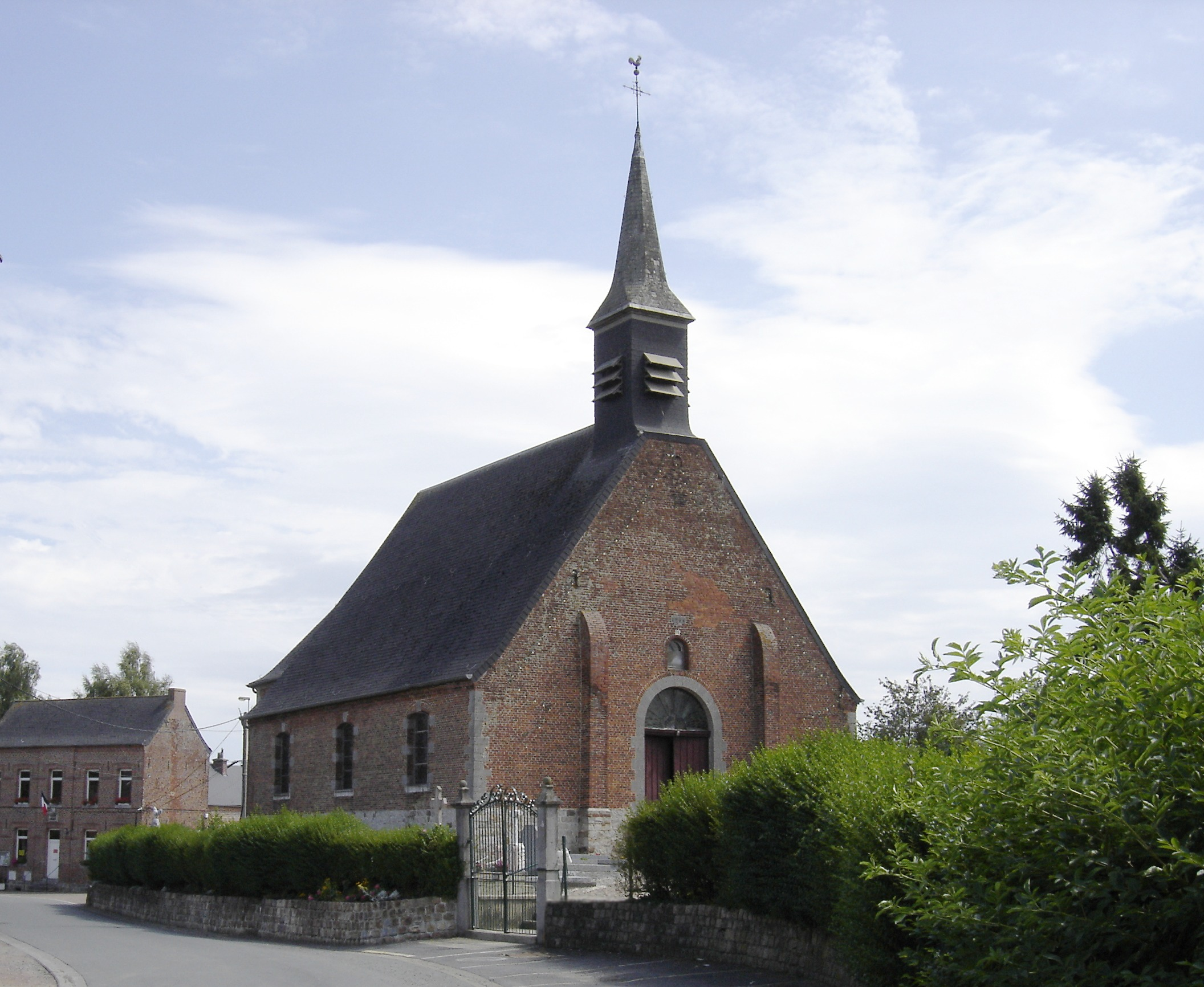
- The church in Hecq

- Coat of arms
- Location of Hecq
- Location within France Location within Hauts-de-France
- Coordinates: 50°10′54″N 3°38′59″E
- Country: France
- Region: Hauts-de-France
- Department: Nord
- Arrondissement: Avesnes-sur-Helpe
- Canton: Avesnes-sur-Helpe
- Intercommunality: CC Pays de Mormal

Government
  - Mayor (2020–2026): Frédéric Carre
- Area^{1}: 1.36 km^{2} (0.53 sq mi)
- Elevation: 131 m (430 ft)
- Highest elevation: 156 m (512 ft)
- Lowest elevation: 138 m (453 ft)
- Population (2023): 353
  - Density: 260/km^{2} (672/sq mi)
- Time zone: UTC+01:00 (CET)
  - Summer (DST): UTC+02:00 (CEST)
- INSEE/Postal code: 59296 /59530
- ^{1} French Land Register data, which excludes lakes, ponds, glaciers > 1 km^{2} (0.386 sq mi or 247 acres) and river estuaries.

Hecq (French pronunciation: [ɛk]) is a commune in the Nord department in northern France.

== Heraldry ==
Arms of Hecq	The arms of Hecq are blazoned : Azure, 3 cinqfoils Or.

== See also ==
- Communes of the Nord department
