= 210th Division =

210th Division may refer to:

- 210th Division (People's Republic of China)
- 210th Coastal Defense Division, Germany
- 210th Division (Israel)
- 210th Coastal Division, Italy
- 210th Rifle Division, Soviet Union

== See also ==
- List of military divisions by number
- 210th Brigade (disambiguation)
- 210th Regiment (disambiguation)
- 210th (disambiguation)
