= Robersart =

- Commune
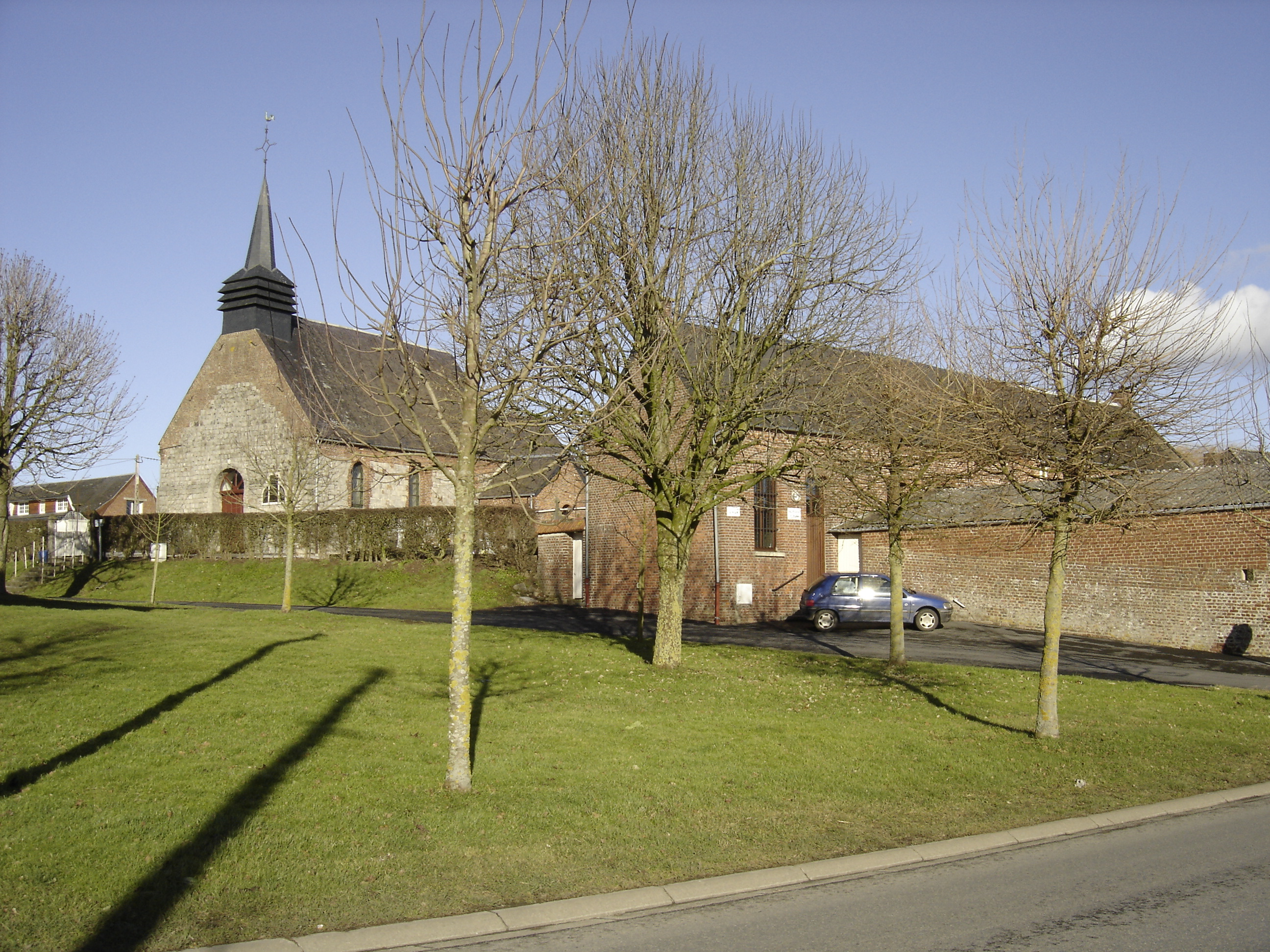
- A view within Robersart

- Coat of arms
- Location of Robersart
- Location within France Location within Hauts-de-France
- Coordinates: 50°09′27″N 3°38′39″E
- Country: France
- Region: Hauts-de-France
- Department: Nord
- Arrondissement: Avesnes-sur-Helpe
- Canton: Avesnes-sur-Helpe
- Intercommunality: CC Pays de Mormal

Government
  - Mayor (2020–2026): Anita Lefevre
- Area^{1}: 2.33 km^{2} (0.90 sq mi)
- Elevation: 150 m (490 ft)
- Highest elevation: 166 m (545 ft)
- Lowest elevation: 139 m (456 ft)
- Population (2023): 201
  - Density: 86.3/km^{2} (223/sq mi)
- Time zone: UTC+01:00 (CET)
  - Summer (DST): UTC+02:00 (CEST)
- INSEE/Postal code: 59503 /59550
- ^{1} French Land Register data, which excludes lakes, ponds, glaciers > 1 km^{2} (0.386 sq mi or 247 acres) and river estuaries.

Robersart (French pronunciation: [ʁɔbɛʁsaʁ]) is a commune in the Nord department in northern France.

== Heraldry ==
Arms of Robersart	The arms of Robersart are blazoned : Vert, a lion Or, armed and langued gules. (Ribécourt-la-Tour and Robersart use the same arms.)

== See also ==
- Communes of the Nord department
