= Canton of Avesnes-sur-Helpe =

Coordinates: 50.12°N 3.93°E

The canton of Avesnes-sur-Helpe is an administrative division of the Nord department, northern France. It was created at the French canton reorganisation which came into effect in March 2015. Its seat is in Avesnes-sur-Helpe.

It consists of the following communes:

1. Avesnes-sur-Helpe
2. Beaudignies
3. Beaufort
4. Beaurepaire-sur-Sambre
5. Boulogne-sur-Helpe
6. Bousies
7. Cartignies
8. Croix-Caluyau
9. Dompierre-sur-Helpe
10. Dourlers
11. Éclaibes
12. Englefontaine
13. Étrœungt
14. Le Favril
15. Floursies
16. Floyon
17. Fontaine-au-Bois
18. Forest-en-Cambrésis
19. Ghissignies
20. Grand-Fayt
21. Haut-Lieu
22. Hautmont
23. Hecq
24. Jolimetz
25. Landrecies
26. Larouillies
27. Limont-Fontaine
28. Locquignol
29. Louvignies-Quesnoy
30. Marbaix
31. Maresches
32. Maroilles
33. Neuville-en-Avesnois
34. Orsinval
35. Petit-Fayt
36. Poix-du-Nord
37. Potelle
38. Preux-au-Bois
39. Prisches
40. Le Quesnoy
41. Raucourt-au-Bois
42. Robersart
43. Ruesnes
44. Saint-Aubin
45. Saint-Hilaire-sur-Helpe
46. Saint-Remy-du-Nord
47. Salesches
48. Semousies
49. Sepmeries
50. Taisnières-en-Thiérache
51. Vendegies-au-Bois
52. Villers-Pol
