= Arrondissement of Avesnes-sur-Helpe =

Coordinates: 50.12°N 3.93°E

Avesnes-sur-Helpe
- Arrondissement
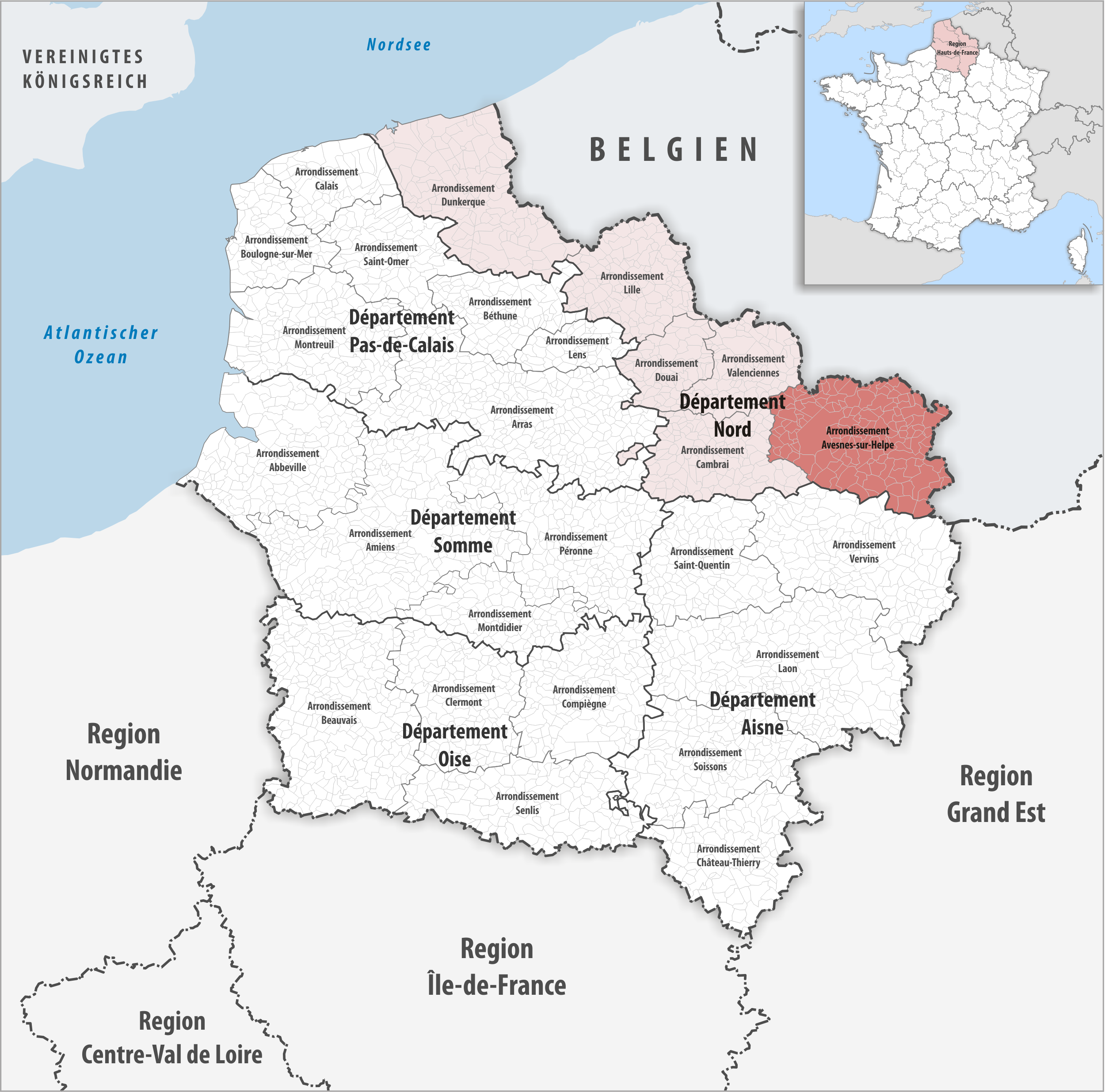
- Location within the region Hauts-de-France
- Country: France
- Region: Hauts-de-France
- Department: Nord
- No. of communes: {{{nbcomm}}}
- Area: 1,407.5 km^{2} (543.4 sq mi)
- Population (2023): 223,006
  - Density: 158.44/km^{2} (410.36/sq mi)
- INSEE code: 591

The arrondissement of Avesnes-sur-Helpe is an arrondissement of France in the Nord department in the Hauts-de-France region. It has 150 communes. Its population is 225,391 (2021), and its area is 1,407.5 km^{2} (543.4 sq mi).

== Composition ==
The communes of the arrondissement of Avesnes-sur-Helpe, and their INSEE codes, are:

1. Aibes (59003)
2. Anor (59012)
3. Assevent (59021)
4. Audignies (59031)
5. Aulnoye-Aymeries (59033)
6. Avesnelles (59035)
7. Avesnes-sur-Helpe (59036)
8. Bachant (59041)
9. Baives (59045)
10. Bas-Lieu (59050)
11. Bavay (59053)
12. Beaudignies (59057)
13. Beaufort (59058)
14. Beaurepaire-sur-Sambre (59061)
15. Beaurieux (59062)
16. Bellignies (59065)
17. Bérelles (59066)
18. Berlaimont (59068)
19. Bersillies (59072)
20. Bettignies (59076)
21. Bettrechies (59077)
22. Beugnies (59078)
23. Boulogne-sur-Helpe (59093)
24. Bousies (59099)
25. Bousignies-sur-Roc (59101)
26. Boussières-sur-Sambre (59103)
27. Boussois (59104)
28. Bry (59116)
29. Cartignies (59134)
30. Cerfontaine (59142)
31. Choisies (59147)
32. Clairfayts (59148)
33. Colleret (59151)
34. Cousolre (59157)
35. Croix-Caluyau (59164)
36. Damousies (59169)
37. Dimechaux (59174)
38. Dimont (59175)
39. Dompierre-sur-Helpe (59177)
40. Dourlers (59181)
41. Eccles (59186)
42. Éclaibes (59187)
43. Écuélin (59188)
44. Élesmes (59190)
45. Englefontaine (59194)
46. Eppe-Sauvage (59198)
47. Eth (59217)
48. Étrœungt (59218)
49. Le Favril (59223)
50. Feignies (59225)
51. Felleries (59226)
52. Féron (59229)
53. Ferrière-la-Grande (59230)
54. Ferrière-la-Petite (59231)
55. La Flamengrie (59232)
56. Flaumont-Waudrechies (59233)
57. Floursies (59240)
58. Floyon (59241)
59. Fontaine-au-Bois (59242)
60. Forest-en-Cambrésis (59246)
61. Fourmies (59249)
62. Frasnoy (59251)
63. Ghissignies (59259)
64. Glageon (59261)
65. Gognies-Chaussée (59264)
66. Gommegnies (59265)
67. Grand-Fayt (59270)
68. Gussignies (59277)
69. Hargnies (59283)
70. Haut-Lieu (59290)
71. Hautmont (59291)
72. Hecq (59296)
73. Hestrud (59306)
74. Hon-Hergies (59310)
75. Houdain-lez-Bavay (59315)
76. Jenlain (59323)
77. Jeumont (59324)
78. Jolimetz (59325)
79. Landrecies (59331)
80. Larouillies (59333)
81. Leval (59344)
82. Lez-Fontaine (59342)
83. Liessies (59347)
84. Limont-Fontaine (59351)
85. Locquignol (59353)
86. La Longueville (59357)
87. Louvignies-Quesnoy (59363)
88. Louvroil (59365)
89. Mairieux (59370)
90. Marbaix (59374)
91. Maresches (59381)
92. Maroilles (59384)
93. Marpent (59385)
94. Maubeuge (59392)
95. Mecquignies (59396)
96. Monceau-Saint-Waast (59406)
97. Moustier-en-Fagne (59420)
98. Neuf-Mesnil (59424)
99. Neuville-en-Avesnois (59425)
100. Noyelles-sur-Sambre (59439)
101. Obies (59441)
102. Obrechies (59442)
103. Ohain (59445)
104. L'Orée de Mormal (59006)
105. Orsinval (59451)
106. Petit-Fayt (59461)
107. Poix-du-Nord (59464)
108. Pont-sur-Sambre (59467)
109. Potelle (59468)
110. Preux-au-Bois (59472)
111. Preux-au-Sart (59473)
112. Prisches (59474)
113. Le Quesnoy (59481)
114. Quiévelon (59483)
115. Rainsars (59490)
116. Ramousies (59493)
117. Raucourt-au-Bois (59494)
118. Recquignies (59495)
119. Robersart (59503)
120. Rousies (59514)
121. Ruesnes (59518)
122. Sains-du-Nord (59525)
123. Saint-Aubin (59529)
124. Saint-Hilaire-sur-Helpe (59534)
125. Saint-Remy-Chaussée (59542)
126. Saint-Remy-du-Nord (59543)
127. Saint-Waast (59548)
128. Salesches (59549)
129. Sars-Poteries (59555)
130. Sassegnies (59556)
131. Sémeries (59562)
132. Semousies (59563)
133. Sepmeries (59565)
134. Solre-le-Château (59572)
135. Solrinnes (59573)
136. Taisnières-en-Thiérache (59583)
137. Taisnières-sur-Hon (59584)
138. Trélon (59601)
139. Vendegies-au-Bois (59607)
140. Vieux-Mesnil (59617)
141. Vieux-Reng (59618)
142. Villereau (59619)
143. Villers-Pol (59626)
144. Villers-Sire-Nicole (59627)
145. Wallers-en-Fagne (59633)
146. Wargnies-le-Grand (59639)
147. Wargnies-le-Petit (59640)
148. Wattignies-la-Victoire (59649)
149. Wignehies (59659)
150. Willies (59661)

== History ==
The arrondissement of Avesnes-sur-Helpe was created in 1800.

As a result of the reorganisation of the cantons of France which came into effect in 2015, the borders of the cantons are no longer related to the borders of the arrondissements. The cantons of the arrondissement of Avesnes-sur-Helpe were, as of January 2015:

1. Avesnes-sur-Helpe-Nord
2. Avesnes-sur-Helpe-Sud
3. Bavay
4. Berlaimont
5. Hautmont
6. Landrecies
7. Maubeuge-Nord
8. Maubeuge-Sud
9. Le Quesnoy-Est
10. Le Quesnoy-Ouest
11. Solre-le-Château
12. Trélon
