= Floyon =

- Commune
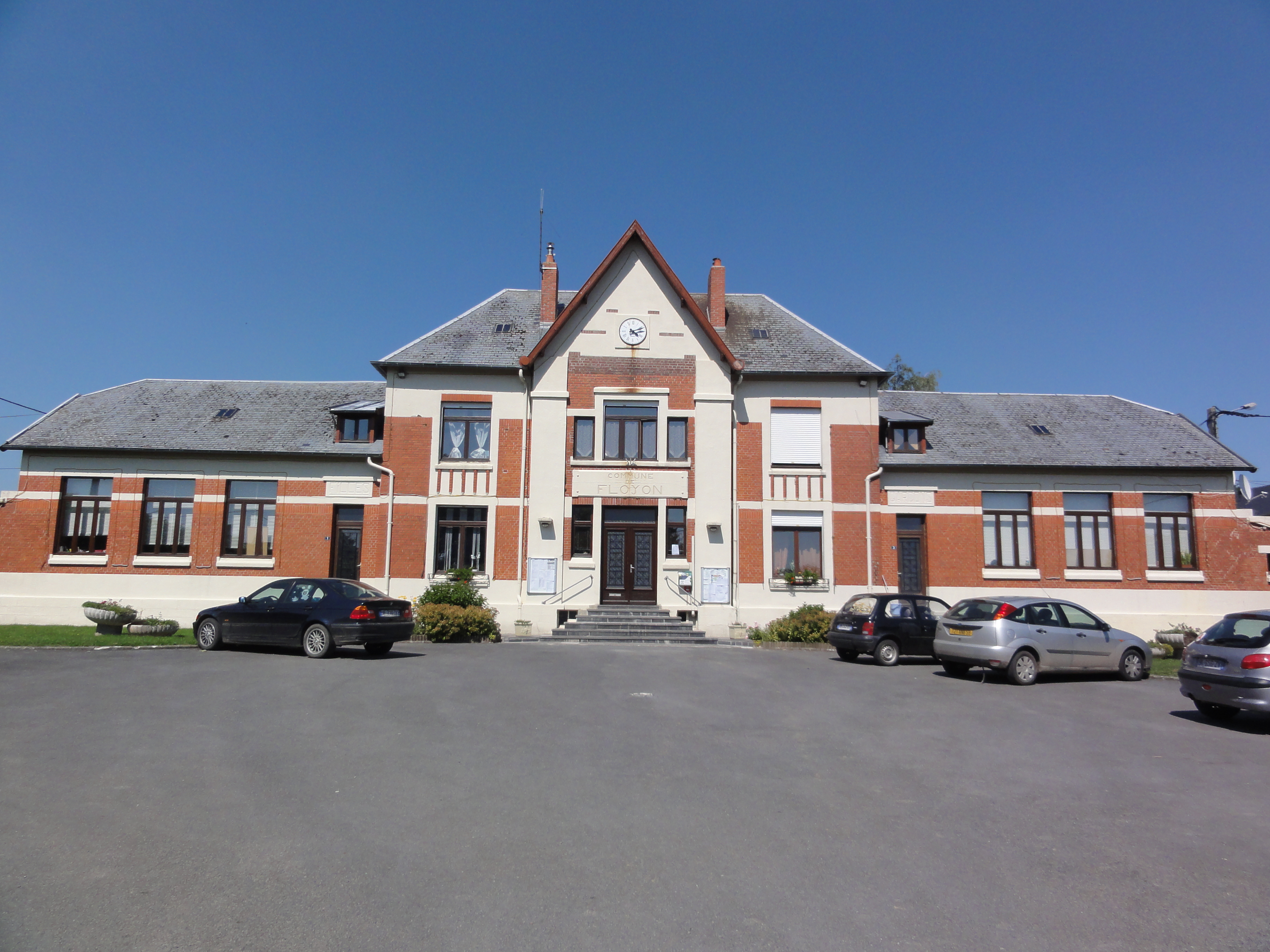
- The town hall in Floyon

- Coat of arms
- Location of Floyon
- Location within France Location within Hauts-de-France
- Coordinates: 50°02′29″N 3°53′17″E
- Country: France
- Region: Hauts-de-France
- Department: Nord
- Arrondissement: Avesnes-sur-Helpe
- Canton: Avesnes-sur-Helpe
- Intercommunality: Cœur de l'Avesnois

Government
  - Mayor (2020–2026): Évelyne Gebhardt
- Area^{1}: 17.47 km^{2} (6.75 sq mi)
- Highest elevation: 234 m (768 ft)
- Lowest elevation: 155 m (509 ft)
- Population (2023): 505
  - Density: 28.9/km^{2} (74.9/sq mi)
- Time zone: UTC+01:00 (CET)
  - Summer (DST): UTC+02:00 (CEST)
- INSEE/Postal code: 59241 /59219
- ^{1} French Land Register data, which excludes lakes, ponds, glaciers > 1 km^{2} (0.386 sq mi or 247 acres) and river estuaries.

Floyon is a commune in the Nord department in northern France.

== Heraldry ==
Arms of Floyon	The arms of Floyon are blazoned : Barry vair and gules bezanty.

== See also ==
- Communes of the Nord department
