= Saint-Hilaire-sur-Helpe =

- Commune
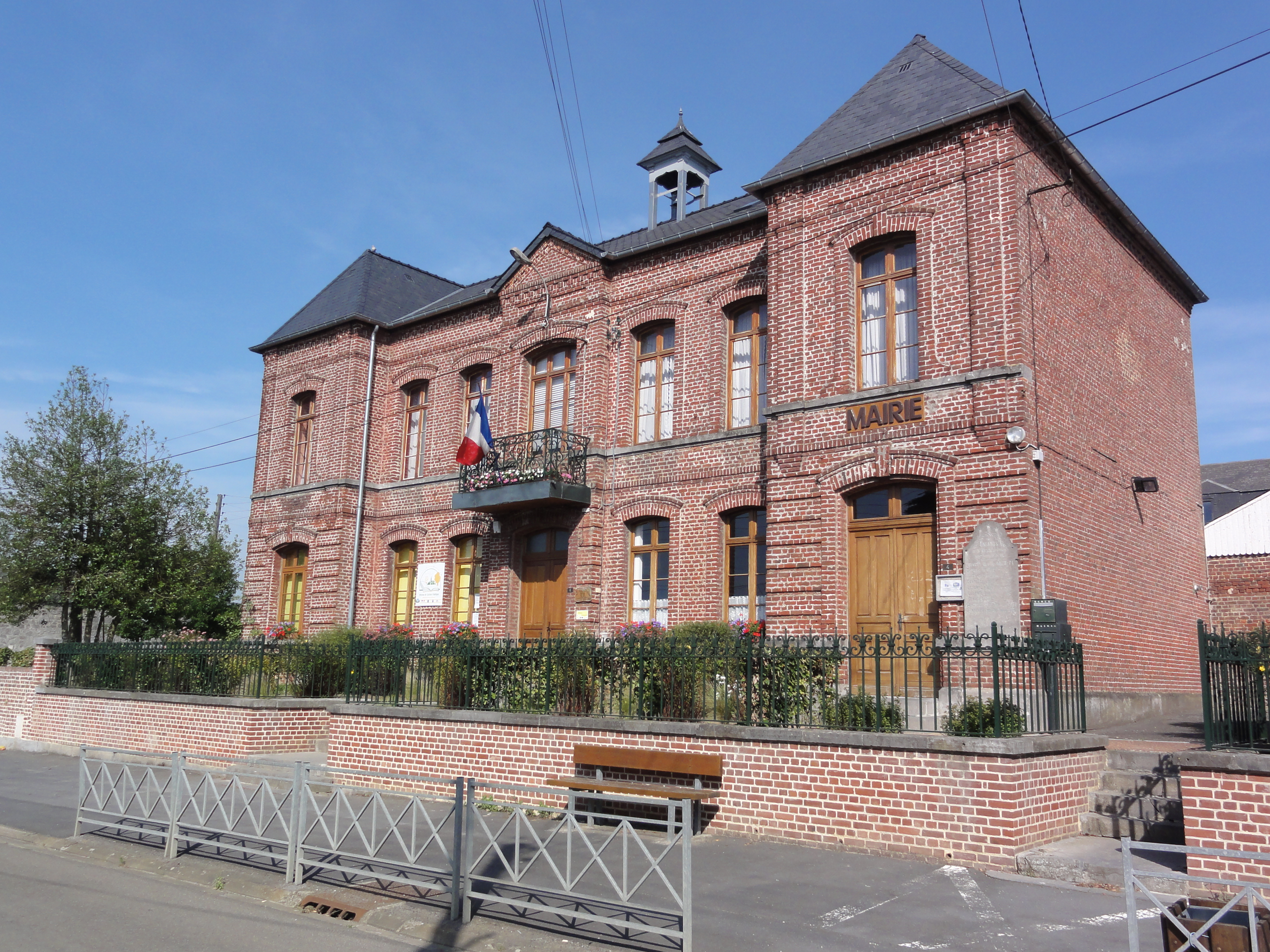
- The town hall in Saint-Hilaire-sur-Helpe

- Coat of arms
- Location of Saint-Hilaire-sur-Helpe
- Location within France Location within Hauts-de-France
- Coordinates: 50°07′56″N 3°54′16″E
- Country: France
- Region: Hauts-de-France
- Department: Nord
- Arrondissement: Avesnes-sur-Helpe
- Canton: Avesnes-sur-Helpe
- Intercommunality: Cœur de l'Avesnois

Government
  - Mayor (2020–2026): Nicolas Dosen
- Area^{1}: 15.41 km^{2} (5.95 sq mi)
- Elevation: 120 m (390 ft)
- Highest elevation: 206 m (676 ft)
- Lowest elevation: 140 m (460 ft)
- Population (2023): 733
  - Density: 47.6/km^{2} (123/sq mi)
- Time zone: UTC+01:00 (CET)
  - Summer (DST): UTC+02:00 (CEST)
- INSEE/Postal code: 59534 /59440
- ^{1} French Land Register data, which excludes lakes, ponds, glaciers > 1 km^{2} (0.386 sq mi or 247 acres) and river estuaries.

Saint-Hilaire-sur-Helpe (French pronunciation: [sɛ̃.t‿ilɛʁ syʁ ɛlp], literally Saint-Hilaire on Helpe) is a commune in the Nord department in northern France.

== Geography ==
=== Climate ===
Saint-Hilaire-sur-Helpe has an oceanic climate (Köppen climate classification Cfb). The average annual temperature in Saint-Hilaire-sur-Helpe is 10.5 °C (50.9 °F). The average annual rainfall is 802.4 mm (31.59 in) with August as the wettest month. The temperatures are highest on average in July, at around 18.5 °C (65.3 °F), and lowest in January, at around 3.1 °C (37.6 °F). The highest temperature ever recorded in Saint-Hilaire-sur-Helpe was 39.0 °C (102.2 °F) on 25 July 2019; the coldest temperature ever recorded was −18.5 °C (−1.3 °F) on 7 January 2009.

Climate data for Saint-Hilaire-sur-Helpe (1991−2020 normals, extremes 2004−present)
Month	Jan	Feb	Mar	Apr	May	Jun	Jul	Aug	Sep	Oct	Nov	Dec	Year
Record high °C (°F)	13.8 (56.8)	20.1 (68.2)	24.7 (76.5)	27.8 (82.0)	31.5 (88.7)	35.0 (95.0)	39.0 (102.2)	36.6 (97.9)	34.5 (94.1)	27.1 (80.8)	20.2 (68.4)	14.7 (58.5)	39.0 (102.2)
Mean daily maximum °C (°F)	5.5 (41.9)	6.4 (43.5)	10.3 (50.5)	15.4 (59.7)	18.5 (65.3)	21.8 (71.2)	24.0 (75.2)	23.0 (73.4)	20.1 (68.2)	15.2 (59.4)	9.6 (49.3)	6.1 (43.0)	14.7 (58.5)
Daily mean °C (°F)	3.1 (37.6)	3.6 (38.5)	6.3 (43.3)	10.1 (50.2)	13.2 (55.8)	16.5 (61.7)	18.5 (65.3)	17.8 (64.0)	15.0 (59.0)	11.5 (52.7)	6.9 (44.4)	3.8 (38.8)	10.5 (50.9)
Mean daily minimum °C (°F)	0.8 (33.4)	0.7 (33.3)	2.4 (36.3)	4.8 (40.6)	8.0 (46.4)	11.3 (52.3)	13.1 (55.6)	12.5 (54.5)	10.0 (50.0)	7.8 (46.0)	4.2 (39.6)	1.5 (34.7)	6.4 (43.5)
Record low °C (°F)	−18.5 (−1.3)	−16.1 (3.0)	−12.0 (10.4)	−4.8 (23.4)	−1.6 (29.1)	1.6 (34.9)	3.5 (38.3)	4.8 (40.6)	1.3 (34.3)	−3.3 (26.1)	−6.4 (20.5)	−12.0 (10.4)	−18.5 (−1.3)
Average precipitation mm (inches)	61.9 (2.44)	64.1 (2.52)	64.5 (2.54)	42.6 (1.68)	69.2 (2.72)	71.5 (2.81)	72.0 (2.83)	86.6 (3.41)	51.2 (2.02)	66.0 (2.60)	68.1 (2.68)	84.7 (3.33)	802.4 (31.59)
Average precipitation days (≥ 1.0 mm)	12.4	11.6	11.1	8.4	10.9	9.3	10.3	10.9	8.8	11.2	12.7	14.0	131.6
Source: Météo-France

== Heraldry ==
Arms of Saint-Hilaire-sur-Helpe	The arms of Saint-Hilaire-sur-Helpe are blazoned : Azure, a cross moline argent, charged with a mullet of 6 points azure.

== See also ==
- Communes of the Nord department
