= Saint-Aubin, Nord =

Saint-Aubin
- Commune
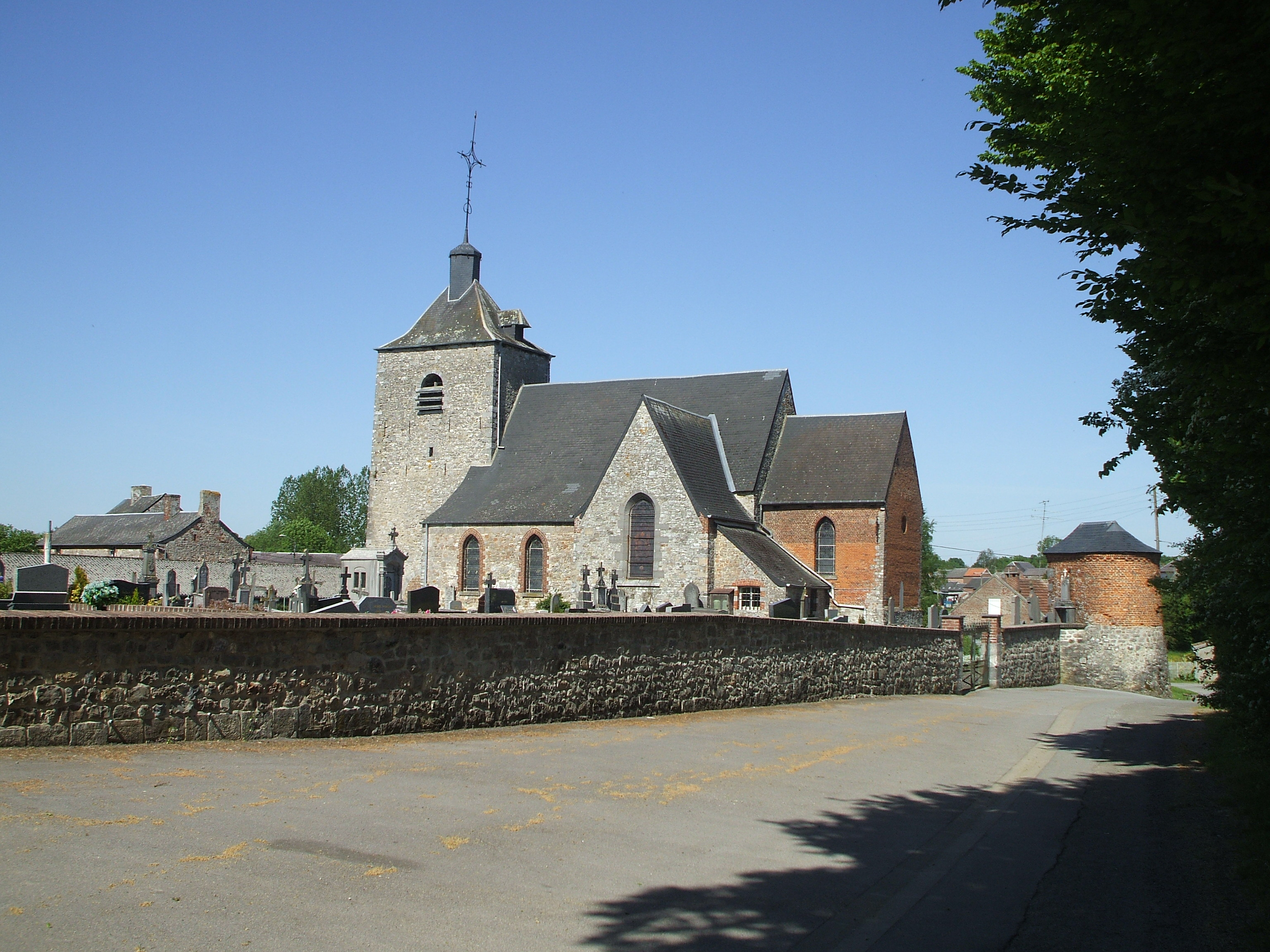
- The church in Saint-Aubin

- Coat of arms
- Location of Saint-Aubin
- Location within France Location within Hauts-de-France
- Coordinates: 50°10′23″N 3°55′11″E
- Country: France
- Region: Hauts-de-France
- Department: Nord
- Arrondissement: Avesnes-sur-Helpe
- Canton: Avesnes-sur-Helpe
- Intercommunality: Cœur de l'Avesnois

Government
  - Mayor (2020–2026): Mauricette Fréhaut
- Area^{1}: 10.12 km^{2} (3.91 sq mi)
- Elevation: 162 m (531 ft)
- Highest elevation: 197 m (646 ft)
- Lowest elevation: 140 m (460 ft)
- Population (2023): 328
  - Density: 32.4/km^{2} (83.9/sq mi)
- Time zone: UTC+01:00 (CET)
  - Summer (DST): UTC+02:00 (CEST)
- INSEE/Postal code: 59529 /59440
- ^{1} French Land Register data, which excludes lakes, ponds, glaciers > 1 km^{2} (0.386 sq mi or 247 acres) and river estuaries.

Saint-Aubin (French pronunciation: [sɛ̃.t‿obɛ̃]) is a commune in the Nord department in northern France.

== Heraldry ==
Arms of Saint-Aubin	The arms of Saint-Aubin are blazoned : Azure, a chevron between 2 mullets of 6 argent and a sun Or.

== See also ==
- Communes of the Nord department
