= Haut-Lieu =

- Commune
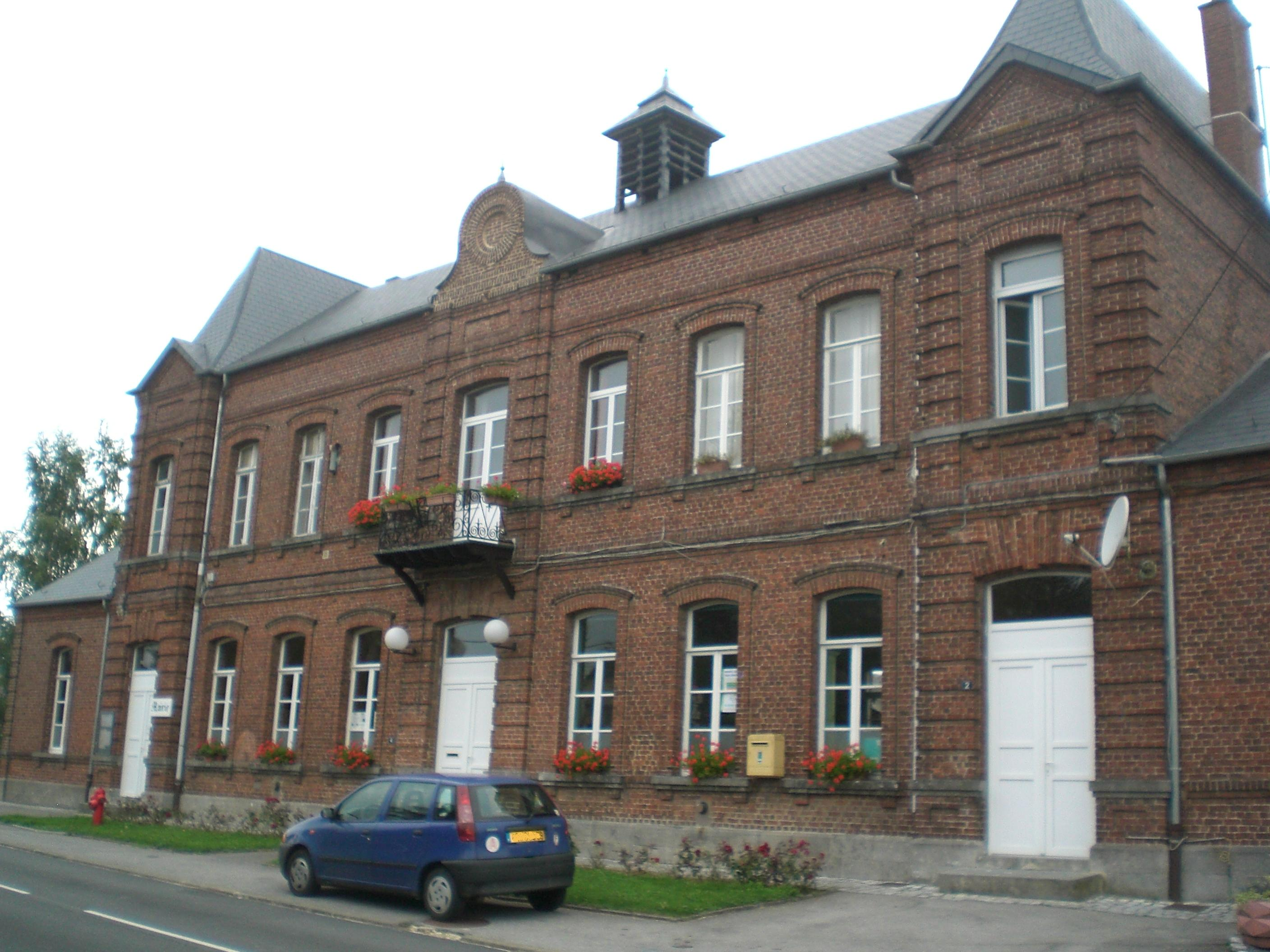
- The town hall in Haut-Lieu
- Location of Haut-Lieu
- Location within France Location within Hauts-de-France
- Coordinates: 50°06′07″N 3°54′48″E
- Country: France
- Region: Hauts-de-France
- Department: Nord
- Arrondissement: Avesnes-sur-Helpe
- Canton: Avesnes-sur-Helpe
- Intercommunality: CC Cœur de l'Avesnois

Government
  - Mayor (2020–2026): Hervé Cuisset
- Area^{1}: 9.07 km^{2} (3.50 sq mi)
- Elevation: 176 m (577 ft)
- Highest elevation: 196 m (643 ft)
- Lowest elevation: 152 m (499 ft)
- Population (2023): 361
  - Density: 39.8/km^{2} (103/sq mi)
- Time zone: UTC+01:00 (CET)
  - Summer (DST): UTC+02:00 (CEST)
- INSEE/Postal code: 59290 /59440
- ^{1} French Land Register data, which excludes lakes, ponds, glaciers > 1 km^{2} (0.386 sq mi or 247 acres) and river estuaries.

Haut-Lieu (French pronunciation: [o ljø]) is a commune in the Nord department in northern France.

== See also ==
- Communes of the Nord department
