= 207th Division (3rd Formation) (People's Republic of China) =

207th Division (1949)
- Active: 1949.9 - 1949.12
- Country: People's Republic of China
- Branch: People's Liberation Army
- Type: Division
- Role: Infantry
- Part of: Huabei Military Region
- Engagements: Chinese Civil War

The 207th Division (Chinese: 第207师) was re-organized in September 1949 from 70th Corps and its 209th and 210th divisions. Its history could be traced to 14th Column of Jinjiluyu Military Region, formed in May 1948.

After its formation the division was under direct control of Huabei Military Region.

Shortly after its activation, in December 1949 the division was disbanded.
