= Ruesnes =

- Commune
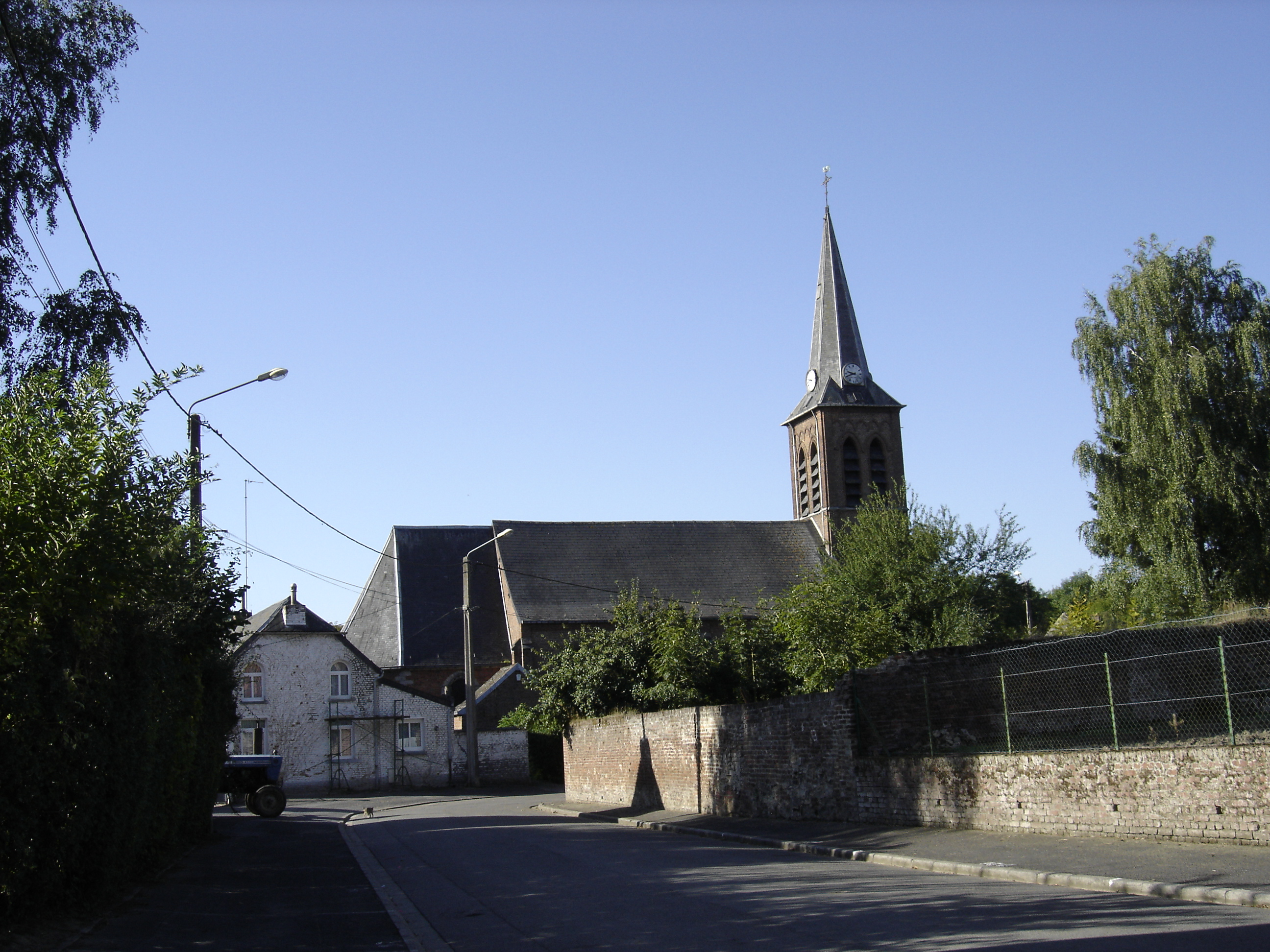
- The church in Ruesnes

- Coat of arms
- Location of Ruesnes
- Location within France Location within Hauts-de-France
- Coordinates: 50°15′34″N 3°35′08″E
- Country: France
- Region: Hauts-de-France
- Department: Nord
- Arrondissement: Avesnes-sur-Helpe
- Canton: Avesnes-sur-Helpe
- Intercommunality: Pays de Mormal

Government
  - Mayor (2020–2026): Claude Blomme
- Area^{1}: 6.75 km^{2} (2.61 sq mi)
- Elevation: 125 m (410 ft)
- Highest elevation: 114 m (374 ft)
- Lowest elevation: 80 m (260 ft)
- Population (2023): 448
  - Density: 66.4/km^{2} (172/sq mi)
- Time zone: UTC+01:00 (CET)
  - Summer (DST): UTC+02:00 (CEST)
- INSEE/Postal code: 59518 /59530
- ^{1} French Land Register data, which excludes lakes, ponds, glaciers > 1 km^{2} (0.386 sq mi or 247 acres) and river estuaries.

Ruesnes (French pronunciation: [ʁɥɛn]) is a commune in the Nord department in northern France.

== Heraldry ==
Arms of Ruesnes	The arms of Ruesnes are blazoned : Azure, a wolf rampant Or.

== See also ==
- Communes of the Nord department
