= Beaudignies =

- Commune
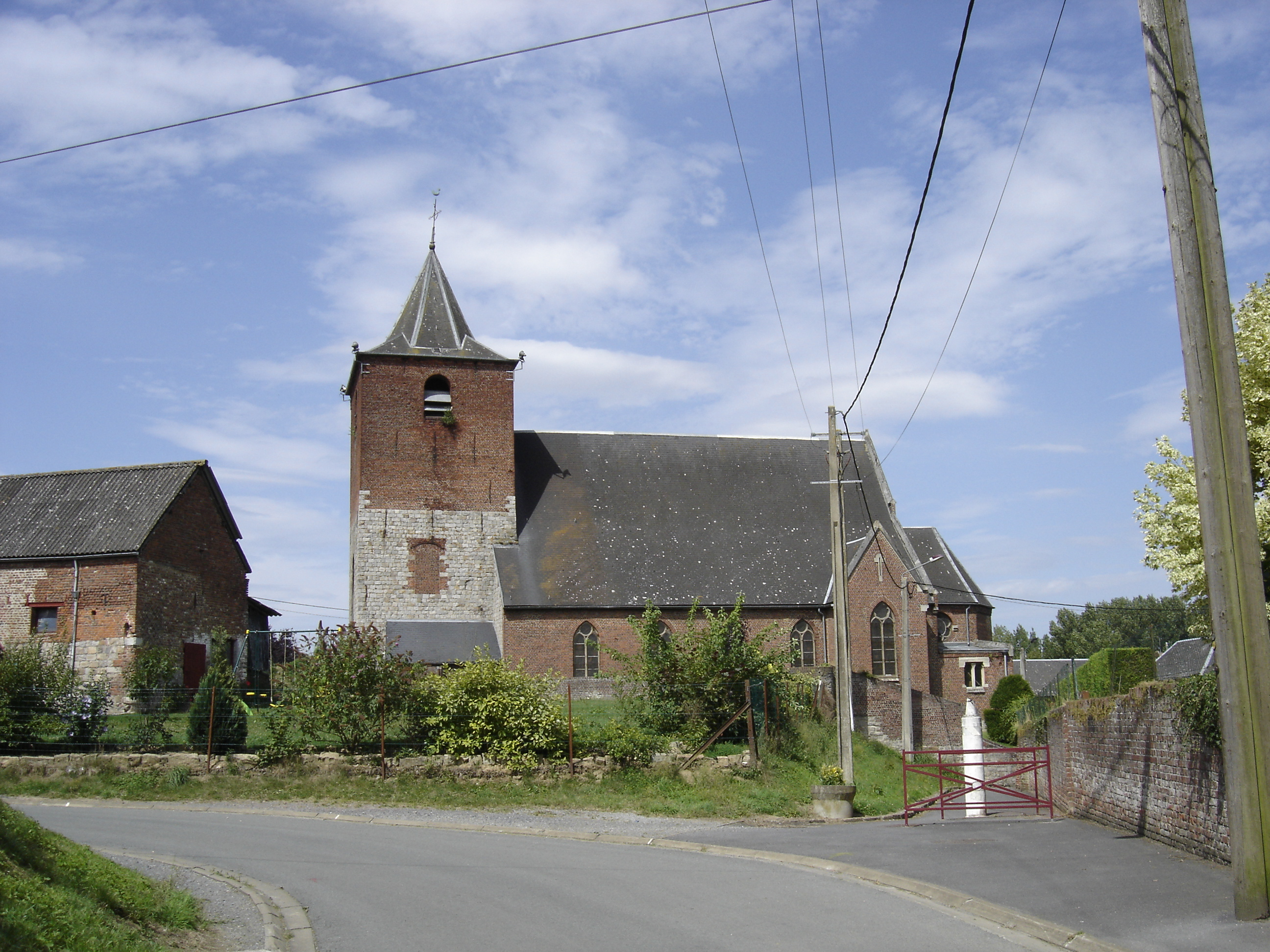
- The church in Beaudignies

- Coat of arms
- Location of Beaudignies
- Location within France Location within Hauts-de-France
- Coordinates: 50°14′15″N 3°35′37″E
- Country: France
- Region: Hauts-de-France
- Department: Nord
- Arrondissement: Avesnes-sur-Helpe
- Canton: Avesnes-sur-Helpe
- Intercommunality: CC Pays de Mormal

Government
  - Mayor (2020–2026): Dominique Fontaine
- Area^{1}: 7.92 km^{2} (3.06 sq mi)
- Elevation: 99 m (325 ft)
- Highest elevation: 131 m (430 ft)
- Lowest elevation: 65 m (213 ft)
- Population (2023): 574
  - Density: 72.5/km^{2} (188/sq mi)
- Time zone: UTC+01:00 (CET)
  - Summer (DST): UTC+02:00 (CEST)
- INSEE/Postal code: 59057 /59530
- ^{1} French Land Register data, which excludes lakes, ponds, glaciers > 1 km^{2} (0.386 sq mi or 247 acres) and river estuaries.

Beaudignies (French pronunciation: [bodiɲi]) is a commune in the Nord department in northern France.

== Population ==
Historical population
Year	Pop.	±% p.a.
1968	597	—
1975	527	−1.77%
1982	543	+0.43%
1990	523	−0.47%
1999	537	+0.29%
2007	575	+0.86%
2012	564	−0.39%
2017	564	+0.00%
2023	574	+0.29%
Source: INSEE

== Heraldry ==
Arms of Beaudignies	The arms of Beaudignies are blazoned : Gules, a crescent between 8 billets in orle, all argent.

== See also ==
- Communes of the Nord department
