= 209th Division (1st Formation) (People's Republic of China) =

209th Division (1949)
- Active: 1949.4 - 1949.9
- Country: People's Republic of China
- Branch: People's Liberation Army
- Type: Division
- Role: Infantry
- Part of: 70th Corps
- Engagements: Chinese Civil War

The 209th Division (Chinese: 第209师) was created in February 1949 under the Regulation of the Redesignations of All Organizations and Units of the Army, issued by Central Military Commission on November 1, 1948, basing on the 41st Brigade, 14th Column of Huabei Military Region, formed in May 1948.

In September 1949 the division was inactivated: the division's personnel, along with the personnel from 210th Division and the headquarter of 70th Corps were re-organized as 207th Division.
