= 210th =

210th may refer to:

- 210th Battalion (Frontiersmen), CEF, a unit in the Canadian Expeditionary Force during the First World War
- 210th Coastal Defense Division (Germany), created in July 1942, and shipped north to defend the port Petsamo in Arctic Finland
- 210th Fires Brigade (United States), constituted on 21 September 1917 in the Regular Army as Headquarters, 2d Field Artillery Brigade
- 210th Rescue Squadron, a unit of the Alaska Air National Guard

== See also ==
- 210th Street – Williamsbridge (IRT Third Avenue Line), the penultimate station on the demolished IRT Third Avenue Line
- 210 (number)
- 210, the year 210 (CCX) of the Julian calendar
