= Armorial of the Communes of Nord (Q–Z) =

This page lists the armoury emblazons, heraldic descriptions, or coats of arms of the communes in Nord (Q-Z)

== Complete lists of Nord armorial pages ==
- Armorial of the Communes of Nord (A–C)
- Armorial of the Communes of Nord (D–H)
- Armorial of the Communes of Nord (I–P)
- Armorial of the Communes of Nord (Q–Z)

== Q ==
Image	Name of Commune	French original blazon	English blazon
	Quaëdypre	D'argent au lion de sable armé et lampassé de gueules à la bordure de gueules.	Argent, a lion sable armed and langued within a bordure gules. (Quaëdypre and Socx use the same arms.)
	Quarouble	D'azur au sautoir d'argent cantonné de quatre macles du même.	Azure, a saltire between 4 mascles argent.
	Quérénaing	D'or à la croix engrêlée de gueules.	Or, a cross engrailed gules. (Artres, Bettrechies, Cerfontaine, Eth, Lesquin, Obies, Quérénaing, Semousies, Wambrechies and Warlaing use the same arms.)
	Le Quesnoy	D'argent à un chêne de sinople, accosté de deux autres chênes plus petits, sur une terrasse du même.	Argent, one oak between two smaller ones, on a base vert.
	Quesnoy-sur-Deûle	Échiqueté d'or et de gueules.	Chequy Or and gules. (Oxelaëre, Quesnoy-sur-Deûle and Sars-et-Rosières use the same arms.)
	Quiévelon	De sable à trois couleuvres ondoyants d'or, languées de gueules mises en pal 2 et 1, au chef d'azur chargé de trois colombes d'argent.	Sable, 3 serpents palewise wavy Or, langued gules, on a chief azure 3 doves argent.
	Quiévrechain	D'argent au croissant d'azur.	Argent, a crescent azure.
	Quiévy	Coupé : au 1, d'azur à une croix de calvaire d'or, entrelacée d'une couronne d'épines du même; au 2, de gueules à trois fleurs de lis d'or.	Per fess 1: Azure, a latin cross enfiled of a crown of thorns Or; 2: Gules, 3 fleurs de lys Or. (Boussières-en-Cambrésis, Morenchies and Quiévy use the same arms.)

== R ==
Image	Name of Commune	French original blazon	English blazon
	Râches	D'or au lion de gueules, armé et lampassé d'azur.	Or, a lion gules, armed and langued azure. (cf Pont-l'Abbé, Escarmain and Haussy)
	Radinghem-en-Weppes	D'or, au chevron de sable, accompagné de trois étoiles à six rais du même, et chargé sur sa pointe d'un écu d'or au lion de sable, armé et lampassé de gueules.	Or, a chevron between 3 mullets of six points sable, on the point of the chevron an inescutcheon Or charged with a lion sable, armed and langued gules.
	Raillencourt-Sainte-Olle	De gueules à trois fasces d'or, à la bordure d'argent.	Gules, 3 fesses Or, a bordure argent.
	Raimbeaucourt	De sable à une fleur de lis épanouie d'argent.	Sable, a fleur de lys épanouie argent.
	Rainsars	D'azur au lion d'or tenant en ses pattes de devant une clef d'argent, le panneton en haut et à dextre.	Azure, a lion Or maintaining a key argent. (Dourlers, Pont-sur-Sambre and Rainsars use the same arms.)
	Raismes	D'azur à trois clefs d'or mises en pal, 2 et 1, les pannetons en haut et à dextre.	Azure, 3 keys Or. (Floursies, Hargnies and Raismes use the same arms.)
	Ramillies	D'azur au dragon d'or.	Azure, a wyvern Or, langued gules. (Bévillers, Honnechy, Ramillies and Wambaix use the same arms.)
	Ramousies	Bandé d'or et de gueules.	Bendy Or and gules. (Avesnes-sur-Helpe, Cartignies, Damousies, Dimechaux, Dimont, Felleries, Larouillies, Lomme, and Ramousies use the same arms.)
	Raucourt-au-Bois	Parti emanché d'argent et de gueules de dix pièces.	Per pale highly indented argent and gules. (Cagnoncles, Landas, Raucourt-au-Bois and Thun-Saint-Amand use the same arms.)
	Recquignies	Burelé d'argent et d'azur de douze pièces, à la bande de gueules brochant sur le tout.	Barry argent and azure, a bend gules.
	Rejet-de-Beaulieu	De sinople à une tour d'argent, chargé sur sa porte d'un huchet d'or	Vert, a tower argent, charged on the door with a hunting horn Or.
	Renescure	Ecartelé : aux 1 et 4, d'argent à une ancre de sable; aux 2 et 3, d'or à cinq trèfles de sinople en sautoir.	Quarterly 1&4: Argent, an anchor sable; 2&3: Or, in saltire 5 trefois vert.
	Reumont	Ecartelé : aux 1 et 4, d'or à l'aigle éployée de sable; aux 2 et 3, d'or au chevron de gueules; sur le tout, d'argent à deux rameaux d'olivier de sinople passés en couronne.	Quarterly 1&4: Or, an eagle displayed sable; 2&3: Or, a chevron gules; overall an inescutcheon argent, a crown of 2 olive branches vert.
	Rexpoëde	D'argent à la fasce de sable, au premier canton d'or bordé de gueules et chargé d'un lion de sable.	Argent, a fess sable, on a canton Or a lion sable within a bordure gules.
	Ribécourt-la-Tour	De sinople au lion d'or, armé et lampassé de gueules.	Vert, a lion Or, armed and langued gules. (Ribécourt-la-Tour and Robersart use the same arms.)
	Rieulay	D'hermines à la croix de gueules, chargée de cinq roses d'or.	Ermine, on a cross gules, 5 roses Or. (Aniche, Bugnicourt, and Rieulay use the same arms.)
	Rieux-en-Cambrésis	D'argent à une fasce de sable.: L'ancien blason est celui des Fagnoeulles: D'or à un double trécheur fleuronné et contre fleuronné de sinople, au sautoir de gueules brochant sur le tout	Argent, a fess sable. (Linselles and Rieux-en-Cambrésis use the same arms.)
	Robersart	De sinople au lion d'or armé et lampassé de gueules.	Vert, a lion Or, armed and langued gules. (Ribécourt-la-Tour and Robersart use the same arms.)
	Rœulx	Bandé d'or et d'azur, au franc-quartier d'argent.	Bendy Or and azure, a canton argent.
	Rombies-et-Marchipont	D'azur à la croix ancrée d'argent, cantonnée de quatre étoiles à six rais du même.	Azure, a cross moline between 4 mullets of 6 points argent. (Rombies-et-Marchipont and Sepmeries use the same arms.)
	Romeries	D'argent au chevron de sable, accompagné de trois trèfles du même.: Un autre blason est retrouvé dans certains endroits de la commune: "D'azur à trois roues d'argent."	Argent, a chevron between 3 trefoils sable. (Assevent, Romeries and Saint-Rémy-Chaussée use the same arms.)
	Ronchin	D'or à l'escarboucle de sable, percée de gueules.	Or, on an escarbuncle sable a ruby gules. (Abscon, Beuvry-la-Forêt, Erre, Fenain, Marchiennes, Ronchin, Tilloy-lez-Marchiennes and Wandignies-Hamage use the same arms.)
	Roncq	D'argent aux troix lionceaux de sables armés et lampassés de gueules.	Argent, 3 lions sable armed and langued gules.
	Roost-Warendin	De sable semé de fleurs de lis d'or.	Sable semy de lys Or.
	Rosendaël; Former commune merged in 1972 with Dunkerque.	D'azur à la Rose d'Argent.: Croix de Guerre avec Etoile d'Argent - 1940,	Azure, a rose argent.
	Rosult	D'azur semé de fleurs de lys d'or.	Azure, semy de lys Or. = France Ancient (Ansacq, Brillon, Escaudain, Escautpont, Hélesmes, Hérin, Lecelles, Lieu-Saint-Amand, Lourches, Neuville-sur-Escaut, Rosult, Rumegies and Wignehies use the same arms.)
	Roubaix	Parti : au premier d'hermine au chef de gueules, au second d'azur au roc de sable encadré d'or, accompagné en chef d'une étoile du même accostée de deux canettes d'argent et en pointe d'une navette aussi d'or, à la bordure denchée du même.: Un autre blason est aussi associé à la commune: D'hermines au chef de gueules.	Ermine, a chief gules impaled with Azure, a rock sable fimbriated Or, in chief a mullet of 5 Or between 2 bobbins argent, and in base a shuttle Or, all within a bordure indented Or.
	Roucourt	Ecartelé d'or et de gueules.	Quarterly Or and gules. (Cappelle-en-Pévèle and Roucourt use the same arms.)
	Rousies	Écartelé : aux 1 et 4, d'argent à trois fasces de gueules; aux 2 et 3, d'argent à trois doloires de gueules, les deux du chef adossées.	Quarterly 1&4: Argent, 3 fesses gules; 2&3: Argent, 3 wagoner's axes top 2 addorsed gules. (Bermerain, Étrœungt, Féron, Ferrière-la-Grande, Lez-Fontaine, Rousies, Solre-le-Château and Solrinnes use the same arms.)
	Rouvignies	De sinople à trois roues d'or.	Vert, three wheels or.
	Rubrouck	De gueules au lion d'argent, armé et lampassé d'or.	Gules, a lion argent armed and langued Or. (Broxeele and Rubrouck use the same arms.)
	Les Rues-des-Vignes	D'azur au sautoir en filet d'or, cantonné de quatre étoiles du même.	Azure, a saltire of thin lines between four mullets or.
	Ruesnes	D'azur au loup ravissant d'or.	Azure, a wolf rampant Or.
	Rumegies	D'azur semé de fleurs de lys d'or.	Azure, semy de lys Or. = France Ancient (Ansacq, Brillon, Escaudain, Escautpont, Hélesmes, Hérin, Lecelles, Lieu-Saint-Amand, Lourches, Neuville-sur-Escaut, Rosult, Rumegies and Wignehies use the same arms.)
	Rumilly-en-Cambrésis	D'or à trois croissants de gueules.	Or, 3 crescents gules. (Anneux, Crèvecœur-sur-l'Escaut, Rumilly-en-Cambrésis, Saint-Souplet and Wargnies-le-Petit use the same arms.)

== S ==
Image	Name of Commune	French original blazon	English blazon
	Sailly-lez-Cambrai	D'argent semé de billettes de gueules, au lion du même brochant sur le tout.	Argent billetty, a lion gules. (Bazenville, Haucourt-en-Cambrésis, Honnecourt-sur-Escaut and Sailly-lez-Cambrai use the same arms.)
	Sailly-lez-Lannoy	De sable au chef d'argent.	Sable, a chief argent. (Ennetières-en-Weppes, Houplines and Sailly-lez-Lannoy use the same arms.)
	Sainghin-en-Mélantois	D'or au franc-canton de gueules.	Or, a canton gules. (Anstaing and Sainghin-en-Mélantois use the same arms.)
	Sainghin-en-Weppes	De gueules au chef d'or.	Gules, a chief Or. (La Neuville, Fresnes-sur-Escaut, Ostricourt, Phalempin and Sainghin-en-Weppes use the same arms.)
	Sains-du-Nord	D'argent à une hure de sanglier de sable défendue du champ et lampassée de gueules.	Argent, a boar's head erased sable, armed argent langued gules. (Liessies, Sains-du-Nord and Sémeries use the same arms.)
	Saint-Amand-les-Eaux	De sinople, à l'épée haute d'argent garnie d'or accostée de deux fleurs de lys du même.	Vert, a sword argent hilted Or between 2 fleurs de lys Or.
	Saint-André-lez-Lille	Coupé, en chef : de gueules à la porte de l'abbaye de Marquette d'or, et en pointe : d'azur aux trois manteaux d'hermine soutenus chacun par une épée argent en pal rangées en fasce.	Per fess 1: Gules, the door of the abbey of Marquette Or; 2: Azure, in fess 3 capes ermine on swords palewise argent.
	Saint-Aubert	D'or à trois chevrons de gueules.	Or, 3 chevrons gules. (Ivry-la-Bataille, Lesdain, Saint-Aubert and Tilloy-lez-Cambrai use the same arms.)
	Saint-Aubin	D'azur au chevron d'argent accompagné en chef de deux étoiles à six rais du même et en pointe d'un soleil d'or.	Azure, a chevron between 2 mullets of 6 argent and a sun Or.
	Saint-Aybert	Pas de blason connu à ce jour.	No known arms. This entry is only for the sake of completeness.
	Saint-Benin	De gueules à une rose tigée et feuillée d'argent.	Gules, a rose slipped and leaved argent. (Bazuel, Maretz and Saint-Benin use the same arms.)
	Saint-Georges-sur-l'Aa	D'or, écartelé aux 1 et 4 à l'aigle de gueules éployée à deux têtes, aux 2 et 3 à un ours de sable rampant contre un billot courbé de gueules la partie droite et gauche. étant séparées par une trangle ondée verticale d'azur représentant l'Aa.	Or, a pale wavy azure between in 1&4: a double-headed eagle gules, in 2&3: a bear rampant sable holding bent tree trunk gules.
	Saint-Hilaire-lez-Cambrai	D'or à trois fasces de gueules.	Or, 3 fesses gules. (Saint-Hilaire-lez-Cambrai, Villereau and Wallers, Rambures use the same arms.)
	Saint-Hilaire-sur-Helpe	D'azur à la croix ancrée d'argent, chargée en cœur d'une étoile à six rais du champ.	Azure, a cross moline argent, charged with a mullet of 6 points azure.
	Saint-Jans-Cappel	D'or à la croix de vair cantonnée au 1er d'un agneau pascal d'argent, la tête nimbée et contournée, le guidon chargé d'une croisette de sable brochant sur la croix.	Or a cross vair, the points abutting in the center of the cross, a canton in chief dexter with an Agnus Dei regardant with a flag adorned with a black cross
	Saint-Martin-sur-Écaillon	De gueules, semé de cotterels ou fers de lance à l'antique d'argent.	Gules, semy of coronels argent. (this is an antique lance head that looks like a crown)
	Saint-Momelin	De gueules à une escarboucle pommetée et fleurdelisée d'or, la branche du milieu terminée en chef par une crosse du même; à la bordure componée d'argent et de sable.	Gules, an escarbuncle pommy and fleury Or, the middle branch ending in a crozier Or, all within a bordure compony argent and sable. (Craywick and Saint-Momelin use the same arms.)
	Saint-Pierre-Brouck	De sable à quatre clefs d'argent, le panneton en haut et à dextre, ordonnées 2 et 2.	Sable, 4 keys argent. (Leers and Saint-Pierre-Brouck use the same arms.)
	Saint-Pol-sur-Mer	Écartelé en sautoir : en chef d'or au lion de sable armé et lampassé de gueules; à dextre et à senestre, de sinople au lion d'or couronné du même; en pointe d'or à la lyre de gueules; un sautoir dentelé de sable brochant de la partition. La commune a utilisée jusqu'aux années 1980 un autre blason : D'or à un nuage d'argent posé en barre chargé en chef d'un biplan de la guerre 1914/1918 d'argent et en pointe d'une cigogne au naturel tenant dans son bec une banderole portant le nom GUYNEMER, le nuage accompagné en chef d'un lion de sable armé et lampassé de gueules (=Flandres); à la champagne vairée d'argent et de sinople chargée de quatre pals d'argent.	Per saltire Or and vert, a saltire indented sable, between a lion sable, armed and langued gules, 2 lions crowned Or, and a lyre gules.
	Saint-Python	D'hermines à trois losanges de gueules.	Ermine, 3 lozenges gules.
	Saint-Rémy-Chaussée	D'argent au chevron de sable, accompagné de trois trèfles du même.	Argent, a chevron between 3 trefoils sable. (Assevent, Romeries and Saint-Rémy-Chaussée use the same arms.)
	Saint-Rémy-du-Nord	D'or à trois chevrons de sable.	Or, 3 chevrons sable. (Bersillies, Boeschepe, Boussières-sur-Sambre, Colleret, Cousolre, Flaumont-Waudrechies, Hautmont, Limont-Fontaine, Lompret, Masny, Neuville-en-Avesnois and Saint-Rémy-du-Nord use the same arms.)
	Saint-Saulve	Parti : au 1, d'or à une demi-aigle de sable mouvante du parti; au 2, d'azur semé de fleurs de lys d'or.	Or, an eagle sable dimidiated with Azure semy de lys Or. The latter being France Ancient (Dechy, Férin and Saint-Saulve use the same arms.)
	Saint-Souplet	D'or à trois croissants de gueules.	Or, 3 crescents gules. (Anneux, Crèvecœur-sur-l'Escaut, Rumilly-en-Cambrésis, Saint-Souplet and Wargnies-le-Petit use the same arms.)
	Saint-Sylvestre-Cappel	D'or à trois huchets de gueules, virolés d'argent.	Or, 3 horns gules, banded argent.
	Saint-Vaast-en-Cambrésis	D'azur, à l'aigle bicéphale d'or becquée et membrée de gueules (adopted 1992): Le dernier blason officiel serait celui de l'Abbaye de Saint-Aubert de Cambrai D'or à trois chevrons de gueules.	Azure, a double-headed eagle Or, beaked and membered gules.
	Saint-Waast-la-Vallée	De vair à trois pals de gueules.	Vair, 3 pales gules. (Englefontaine, Louvignies-Quesnoy, Poix-du-Nord and Saint-Waast-la-Vallée use the same arms.)
	Sainte-Marie-Cappel	D'hermine à la fasce de gueules.	Ermine, a fess gules. (Sainte-Marie-Cappel and Staple use the same arms.)
	Salesches	D'argent à un rencontre de cerf de gueules brochant sur une crosse d'or en pal.	Argent, a stag's massacre gules surmounting a crozier palewise Or. (Marbaix, Maroilles, Noyelles-sur-Sambre, and Salesches use the same arms.)
	Salomé	D'azur à l'écu d'argent, accompagné en chef de trois merlettes d'or rangées en fasce.	Azure, an inescutcheon argent, and in chief (in fess) 3 martlets Or. (Cauroir and Salomé use the same arms.)
	Saméon	Parti émanché d'or et d'azur de dix pièces.	Per pale highly indented Or and azure.
	Sancourt	D'azur au lion d'or.	Azure, a lion Or.
	Santes	D'argent à trois lionceaux de sinople, lampassés de gueules.	Argent, 3 lions vert, langued gules.
	Sars-et-Rosières	Échiqueté d'or et de gueules.	Chequy Or and gules. (Oxelaëre, Quesnoy-sur-Deûle and Sars-et-Rosières use the same arms.)
	Sars-Poteries	D'or à la bande de gueules chargée de trois lionceaux d'argent.	Or, on a bend gules, 3 lions argent.
	Sassegnies	Ecartelé : Aux 1 et 4, d'azur à un escarboucle fleurdelisé d'or : Au 2 et 3 d'azur à trois bandes d'or; Et sur l'écartelé, un chef de gueules à la croix d'argent.	Quarterly 1&4: Azure, an escarbuncle fleury Or; 2&3: Azure, 3 bends Or; on a chief gules a cross argent.
	Saultain	Bandé d'argent et de gueules de six pièces.	Bendy argent and gules. (La Flamengrie, Fournes-en-Weppes and Wargnies-le-Grand use the same arms.)
	Saulzoir	D'azur au croissant d'or, accompagné de onze billettes du même, cinq en chef et six en pointe, 3, 2 et 1.	Azure, a crescent between 11 billets (in chief in fess 5, in base 3,2,1) Or.
	Sebourg	D'azur à trois têtes d'aigle arrachées d'argent.	Azure, 3 eagles heads erased argent.
	Seclin	De gueules à la lettre S d'or, couronnée du même.	Gules, the letter S, crowned Or.
	Selvigny; Former commune merged in October 1972 with Walincourt to form Walincourt-Selvigny	D'azur à la fasce d'or, chargée de trois croix potencées de sable, et accompagnée de trois roses à six feuilles d'argent.	Azure, on a fess Or between 3 six petalled roses argent, 3 crosses patonce sable.
	Sémeries	D'argent à une hure de sanglier de sable défendue du champ et lampassée de gueules.	Argent, a boar's head erased sable, armed argent langued gules. (Liessies, Sains-du-Nord and Sémeries use the same arms.)
	Semousies	D'or à la croix engrêlée de gueules.	Or, a cross engrailed gules. (Artres, Bettrechies, Cerfontaine, Eth, Lesquin, Obies, Quérénaing, Semousies, Wambrechies and Warlaing use the same arms.)
	La Sentinelle	Pas de blason connu à ce jour.	No known arms. This entry is only for the sake of completeness.
	Sepmeries	D'azur à la croix ancrée d'argent, cantonnée de quatre étoiles à six rais du même.	Azure, a cross moline between 4 mullets of 6 points argent. (Rombies-et-Marchipont and Sepmeries use the same arms.)
	Sequedin	Parti d'azur et d'or, au nom de Sequedin mis en fasce, entre deux cotices d'argent sur l'azur et de sable sur l'or.	Per pale azure and Or, the name 'Sequedin' between two barrulets counterchanged argent and sable.
	Séranvillers; Former commune merged in 1964 with Forenville to form Séranvillers-Forenville.	D'azur au chevron d'or, accompagné en chef de deux étoiles à six rais et en pointe d'une quintefeuille du même.	Azure, a chevron Or between 2 mullets of 6 and a cinqfoil Or.
	Sercus	D'argent au lion contourné de sable, et un lambel à trois pendants de gueules en chef.	Argent, a lion contourny sable, in chief a label of 3 points gules.
	Sin-le-Noble	De sable à trois gerbes d'or liées de gueules.	Sable, 3 garbs Or, tied gules.
,	Socx	D'argent au lion de sable armé et lampassé de gueules à la bordure de gueules.	Argent, a lion sable armed and langued within a bordure gules. (Quaëdypre and Socx use the same arms.)
	Solesmes	De sable aux trois croissants d'argent.	Sable, 3 crescents argent.
	Solre-le-Château	Écartelé : aux 1 et 4, d'argent à trois fasces de gueules; aux 2 et 3, d'argent à trois doloires de gueules, les deux du chef adossées.	Quarterly 1&4: Argent, 3 fesses gules; 2&3: Argent, 3 wagoner's axes top 2 addorsed gules. (Bermerain, Étrœungt, Féron, Ferrière-la-Grande, Lez-Fontaine, Rousies, Solre-le-Château and Solrinnes use the same arms.)
	Solrinnes	Écartelé : aux 1 et 4, d'argent à trois fasces de gueules; aux 2 et 3, d'argent à trois doloires de gueules, les deux du chef adossées.	Quarterly 1&4: Argent, 3 fesses gules; 2&3: Argent, 3 wagoner's axes top 2 addorsed gules. (Bermerain, Étrœungt, Féron, Ferrière-la-Grande, Lez-Fontaine, Rousies, Solre-le-Château and Solrinnes use the same arms.)
	Somain, Nord	Parti : au 1, de gueules à une escarboucle d'or, percée d'azur; au 2, d'azur à trois fleurs de lis d'or.	Gules, an escarbuncle Or, pierced azure impaled with Azure, 3 fleurs de lys Or.
	Sommaing	D'argent au lion de gueules et une bordure engrêlée d'azur.	Argent, a lion gules within a bordure engrailed azure.
	Spycker	D'argent semé de billettes de sable, et un lion du même, armé et lampassé de gueules, brochant sur le tout.	Argent billetty, a lion sable armed and langued gules. (Loon-Plage and Spycker use the same arms.)
	Staple	D'hermine à la fasce de gueules.	Ermine, a fess gules. (Sainte-Marie-Cappel and Staple use the same arms.)
	Steenbecque	D'azur à trois coquilles d'argent.	Azure, 3 escallops argent.
	Steene	D'or au chevron de gueules, accompagné de trois mouchetures d'hermines de sable.	Or, a chevron gules between 3 ermine spots sable.
Steenvoorde	Steenvoorde	A 2 parties : Fascé d'or et d'azur de huit pièces, et trois annelets de gueules brochant sur les deux premières fasces en chef, au second, ecartelé: aux 1 et 4 d'or aux trois traits verticaux de sable à la bordure engrelée d'azur, aux 2 et 3 fascé d'argent et d'azur de dix pièces au lion de sable brochant sur le tout.: Ancien Blason : Fascé d'or et d'azur de huit pièces, et trois annelets de gueules brochant sur les deux premières fasces en chef.	Barry Or and azure, in chief in fess 3 annulets impaled with Quarterly 2&4: Or, 3 ?pallets couped? sable within a bordure engrailed azure; 2&3: Barry argent and azure, a lion sable.
	Steenwerck	De gueules à la croix dentelée d'argent.	Gules, a cross indented argent. (Estourmel and Steenwerck use the same arms.)
	Strazeele	De gueules à la bande d'or, accompagnée de six étoiles à six rais du même, mises en orle.	Gules, a bend, between in orle 6 mullets of six points Or.

== T ==
Image	Name of Commune	French original blazon	English blazon
	Taisnières-en-Thiérache	Taillé : au premier de sinople à la cloche d'or brochant sur une crosse du même, au second d'azur aux deux roues de moulin rangées en barre; à la barre ondée d'argent chargée des lettres capitales à plomb P, D et V de gueules, brochant sur la partition.	Per bend sinister vert and azure, on a bend sinister wavy argent between a bell transfixed by a crozier and in base 2 wheels Or, the letters P, D and V gules.
	Taisnières-sur-Hon	De gueules à deux clefs d'or adossées en sautoir, les pannetons en haut.	Gules, 2 keys in saltire addorsed Or. (Hon-Hergies, Moustier-en-Fagne and Taisnières-sur-Hon use the same arms.)
	Templemars	D'azur semé de billettes d'argent, au lion du même, armé et lampassé de gueules, brochant sur le tout.	Azure, billetty, a lion argent, armed and langued gules. (La Longueville, Templemars, and Verchain-Maugré use the same arms.)
	Templeuve	D'azur au nom de Templeuve d'argent mis en bande, entre deux doubles cotices d'or.	Azure, the name Templeuve bendwise argent between 2 bendlets gemel Or.
	Terdeghem	D'azur à trois jumelles d'or.	Azure, 3 bars gemel Or. (Terdeghem and Beaufort-Blavincourt use the same arms.)
	Téteghem	Échiqueté d'argent et d'azur à la bande de gueules brochant sur le tout.	Chequy argent and azure, a bend gules.
	Thiant	De sinople semé de billettes d'argent, au lion du même, armé et lampassé de gueules, brochant sur le tout.	Vert, billetty, a lion argent, armed and langued gules. (Thiant and Aubry-du-Hainaut use the same arms.)
	Thiennes	D'or à la bordure d'azur, à l'écusson d'argent en abîme, bordé d'azur, chargé d'un lion de gueules, armé, lampassé et couronné du champ.	Or, an inescutcheon argent, a lion gules, armed langue and crowned Or within a bordure azure, all within a bordure azure.
	Thivencelle	De gueules à la rose d'argent boutonnée d'or.	Gules, a rose argent ?seeded? Or.
	Thumeries	D'argent aux trois pals de gueules et au franc-canton dextre de sable chargé d'un lion d'or.	Argent, 3 pales gules, overall on a canton sable, a lion Or.
	Thun-l'Évêque	D'or aux trois lionceaux d'azur, au chef de gueules chargé de Notre Dame de Grâce de carnation, à mi-corps, tenant à senestre l'Enfant Jésus du même, habillée aussi de gueules et d'azur.	Or, 3 lions azure, on a chief gules, a demi-'Notre-Dame-de-Grâce de carnation' issuant from the line of division, vested gules and azure and holding in her left arm the Baby Jesus. (Boursies, Cattenières, Carnières, Estrun, Maresches, Onnaing, Ors, Orsinval, Thun-l'Évêque and originally, Notre-Dame de Cambrai, use the same arms.)
	Thun-Saint-Amand	Parti émanché d'argent et de gueules.	Per pale highly indented argent and gules. (Cagnoncles, Landas, Raucourt-au-Bois and Thun-Saint-Amand use the same arms.)
	Thun-Saint-Martin	D'argent au lion de gueules couronné d'or à l'antique et accompagné de six coquilles d'azur.	Argent, a lion gules antiquely crowned Or, between 6 escallops azure.
	Tilloy-lez-Cambrai	D'or aux trois chevrons de gueules.	Or, 3 chevrons gules. (Ivry-la-Bataille, Lesdain, Saint-Aubert and Tilloy-lez-Cambrai use the same arms.)
	Tilloy-lez-Marchiennes	D'or à l'escarboucle de sable, chargée en cœur d'un rubis de gueules.	Or, on an escarbuncle sable a ruby gules. (Abscon, Beuvry-la-Forêt, Erre, Fenain, Marchiennes, Ronchin, Tilloy-lez-Marchiennes and Wandignies-Hamage use the same arms.)
	Toufflers	D'argent aux trois lionceaux de sinople, armés et lampassés de gueules, couronnés d'or et chargés chacun d'un écusson d'argent à la croix d'azur.	Argent, 3 lions vert armed and langued gules, crowned Or, and each charged with an inescutcheon argent, a cross azure.
	Tourcoing	D'argent à la croix de sable chargée de cinq besants d'or.	Argent, on a cross sable, 5 bezants (Or).
	Tourmignies	De gueules à la fasce d'hermine.	Gules, a fess ermine.
	Trélon	De gueules à deux fasces bretessées d'argent; au franc-canton senestre d'hermine au chef d'argent.	Gules, 2 fesses embattled counter-embattled argent, overall a sinister canton ermine with a chief argent.
	Tressin	D'azur semé de fleurs de lys d'or à l'écusson d'or chargé d'un lion de sable, armé et lampassé de gueules, brochant en abîme sur le tout.	Azure semy de lys, on an inescutcheon Or a lion sable, armed and langued gules.
	Trith-Saint-Léger	D'argent au croissant de gueules.	Argent, a crescent gules.
	Troisvilles	D'azur au chevron d'or, accompagné en chef de deux étoiles de six rais du même et en pointe d'un trèfle aussi d'or.	Azure, a chevron between 2 mullets of 6 and a trefoil Or. (Bertry and Troisvilles use the same arms.)

== U ==
Image	Name of Commune	French original blazon	English blazon
	Uxem	Parti : au 1, de gueules à trois léopards d'or rangés en pal; au 2, échiqueté d'argent et d'azur, au canton d'hermine.	Gules, 3 leopards Or impaled with Chequy argent and azure, a canton ermine.

== V ==
Image	Name of Commune	French original blazon	English blazon
	Valenciennes	De gueules, au lion d'or armé et lampassé d'azur.	Gules, a lion Or, armed and langued azure.
	Vendegies-au-Bois	Vairé d'or et d'azur.	Vairy Or and azure. (Beaurain, Nieurlet and Vendegies-au-Bois use the same arms.)
	Vendegies-sur-Écaillon	D'or à la roue de six rayons de gueules.	Or, a 6-spoked wheel gules.
	Vendeville	Plumeté d'or et de sable.	Plumetty Or and sable. (Mérignies and Vendeville use the same arms.)
	Verchain-Maugré	D'azur semé de billettes d'argent, au lion du même armé et lampassé de gueules, brochant sur le tout.	Azure, billetty, a lion argent, armed and langued gules. (La Longueville, Templemars, and Verchain-Maugré use the same arms.)
	Verlinghem	Écartelé : aux 1 et 4 d'argent, au lion de gueules, armé et lampassé d'azur, couronné d'or, aux 2 et 3, de gueules, à une étoile à seize rais d'argent.	Quarterly 1&4: Argent, a lion gules, armed and langued azure, crowned Or; 2&3: Gules, a mullet of 16 argent.
	Vertain	D'argent aux trois jumelles de gueules.	Argent, 3 bars gemel gules. (Haveluy and Vertain use the same arms.)
	Vicq	D'azur à une croix pattée et alaisée d'argent, l'écu semé de fleurs de lis du même.	Azure semy de lys, a cross patty argent.
	Viesly	D'or à la bande de sable.	Or, a bend sable. (Flesquières, Gonnelieu, Mons-en-Barœul and Viesly use the same arms.)
	Vieux-Berquin	D'or à cinq cotices de gueules.	Or, 5 bendlets gules. (Hallennes-lez-Haubourdin and Vieux-Berquin use the same arms.)
	Vieux-Condé	D'argent à la fasce de gueules chargée d'une divise vivrée du champ.	Argent, on a fess gules, a vivre of the field.
	Vieux-Mesnil	De gueules au chevron d'or, accompagné de trois trèfles d'argent.	Gules, a chevron Or between 3 trefoils argent. (Bachant and Vieux-Mesnil use the same arms.)
	Vieux-Reng	De gueules à une étoile à douze rais d'or.	Gules, a mullet of 12 Or.
	Villeneuve d'Ascq	Tiercé en fasce : au premier d'or à la fasce d'azur et au sautoir de gueules brochant sur le tout, au deuxième de gueules au chef échiqueté d'argent et d'azur de trois tires, au troisième de sinople à la bande échiquetée d'argent et de gueules de deux tires.	Tierced per fess 'Ascq', 'Flers-lez-Lille' and 'Annappes'
	Villereau	D'or à trois fasces de gueules.	Or, 3 fesses gules. (Saint-Hilaire-lez-Cambrai, Villereau and Wallers, Rambures use the same arms.)
	Villers-au-Tertre	D'azur à un écusson d'argent, accompagné de onze billettes du même mises en orle.	Azure, an inescutcheon between in orle 11 billets argent. (Ligny-en-Cambrésis, Masnières and Villers-au-Tertre use the same arms.)
	Villers-Campeau former commune absorbed by Somain in 1947.	Burelé d'argent et d'azur de douze pièces.	Barry argent and azure. (Boussois, Noyelles-sur-Escaut and Villers-Campeau use the same arms.)
	Villers-en-Cauchies	D'azur au chevron d'argent accompagné de trois coupes couvertes d'or.	Azure, a chevron argent between 3 covered cups Or.
	Villers-Guislain	Tiercé en pal : au premier d'azur au lys d'argent, au deuxième de gueules à la demi-aigle bicéphale d'argent en chef et à la demi-croix potencée du même en pointe, le tout mouvant de dextre, au troisième d'or aux trois barres d'azur.	Tierced per pale 1: Azure, a ?fleur de? lys argent; 2: Gules, a demi- doubleheaded eagle and a demi-cross potenty argent, both issuant from the dexter line of division; 3: Or, 3 fesses azure.
	Villers-Outréaux	De gueules à la croix dentelée d'or.	Gules, a cross indented Or.
	Villers-Plouich	D'hermine au chef de sable.	Ermine, a chief sable.
	Villers-Pol	D'argent à la bande de sable chargée de trois fleurs de lis d'or.	Argent, on a bend sable 3 fleurs de lys Or.
	Villers-Sire-Nicole	D'argent à trois lionceaux de gueules, armés, lampassés et couronnés d'or.	Argent, 3 lions gules, armed, langued and crowned Or. (Eccles, Nord and Villers-Sire-Nicole use the same arms.)
	Volckerinckhove	De sable au chef d'argent, chargé de deux molettes de gueules.	Sable, on a chief argent, 2 mullets of 6 points pierced gules.
	Vred	D'azur semé de fleurs de lis d'or, au cerf d'argent passant sur le tout.	Azure semy de lys Or, a stag argent. (Capelle, Loffre, Neuville-Saint-Rémy, Pecquencourt, and Vred use the same arms.)

== W ==
Image	Name of Commune	French original blazon	English blazon
	Wahagnies	Gironné d'argent et de sable, le sable semé de croix recroisettées d'or.	Gyronny argent and sable semy of cross crosslets.
	Walincourt; Former commune merged with Selvigny in October 1972 to form Walincourt-Selvigny	D'argent au lion de gueules.	Argent, a lion gules. (the Counts of Armagnac and the communes of Walincourt, Humerœuille, La Roche-Derrien, Sornac, Espelette, Gigean, Médis and Erquery use the same arms.)
	Wallers	D'or à trois fasces de gueules.	Or, 3 fesses gules. (Saint-Hilaire-lez-Cambrai, Villereau and Wallers, Rambures use the same arms.)
	Wallers-en-Fagne	D'or à quatre pals de gueules, à la bordure engrêlée d'azur.	Or, 4 pales gules within a bordure engrailed azure. (Eppe-Sauvage, Ohain and Wallers-en-Fagne use the same arms.)
	Wallon-Cappel	D'or à deux fasces de gueules.	Or, 2 fesses gules.
	Wambaix	D'azur à un dragon d'or lampassé de gueules, s'essorant en fasce.	Azure, a wyvern Or, langued gules. (Bévillers, Honnechy, Ramillies and Wambaix use the same arms.)
	Wambrechies	D'or à la croix engrêlée de gueules.	Or, a cross engrailed gules. (Artres, Bettrechies, Cerfontaine, Eth, Lesquin, Obies, Quérénaing, Semousies, Wambrechies and Warlaing use the same arms.)
	Wandignies-Hamage	D'or à une escarboucle de sable, chargée en cœur d'un rubis de gueules.	Or, on an escarbuncle sable a ruby gules. (Abscon, Beuvry-la-Forêt, Erre, Fenain, Marchiennes, Ronchin, Tilloy-lez-Marchiennes and Wandignies-Hamage use the same arms.)
	Wannehain	Bandé d'argent et d'azur de six pièces.	Bendy argent and azure. (Fretin, Saultain and Wannehain use the same arms.)
	Wargnies-le-Grand	Bandé d'argent et de gueules.	Bendy argent and gules. (La Flamengrie, Fournes-en-Weppes and Wargnies-le-Grand use the same arms.)
	Wargnies-le-Petit	D'or à trois croissants de gueules.	Or, 3 crescents gules. (Anneux, Crèvecœur-sur-l'Escaut, Rumilly-en-Cambrésis, Saint-Souplet and Wargnies-le-Petit use the same arms.)
	Warhem	Echiqueté d'argent et de sable de douze pièces.	Chequy argent and sable.
	Warlaing	D'or à la croix engrêlée de gueules.	Or, a cross engrailed gules. (Artres, Bettrechies, Cerfontaine, Eth, Lesquin, Obies, Quérénaing, Semousies, Wambrechies and Warlaing use the same arms.)
	Warneton	D'argent à la fasce de gueules.	Argent, a fess gules. (the Béthune family and the communes of Cuts, Rosny-sur-Seine, Warneton and Noyon use the same arms.)
	Wasnes-au-Bac	D'azur aux trois gerbes de blé d'or.	Azure, 3 garbs Or. (in addition to the following, other places use similar arms, but with the garbs tied different colours Chaumes-en-Brie, Bonnétable, Capelle-Fermont, Estevelles, Saint-Sever-Calvados, Gerberoy and Wasnes-au-Bac use the same arms.)
	Wasquehal	Échiqueté d'argent et de gueules, chaque pièce d'argent chargée d'une moucheture d'hermine de sable.	Chequy argent and gules, each argent piece charged with an ermine spot sable. or, more simply, Chequy ermine and gules.
	Watten	Coupé, au premier d'argent à trois pals de gueules, au second de gueules à trois pals d'argent. Ancien Blason : D'or à la fasce de gueules et un lambel à trois pendants d'azur en chef.	Per fess argent and gules, 3 pales counterchanged.
	Wattignies	D'or au sautoir brétessé et contre-brétessé de sable.	Or, a saltire embattled counter-embattled sable.
	Wattignies-la-Victoire	De gueules à la bande de vair.	Gules, a bend vair. (Neuf-Mesnil and Wattignies-la-Victoire use the same arms.)
	Wattrelos	D'azur au lion fascé d'argent et de gueules, armé, lampassé et couronné d'or.	Azure, a lion barry argent and gules, armed, langued and crowned Or.
	Wavrechain-sous-Faulx	Parti : au 1, d'or à trois léopards de sable passant l'un sur l'autre; au 2, d'azur au chevron d'or accompagné de trois besants du même.	Or, 3 leopards sable impaled with Azure, a chevron Or between 3 bezants (Or).
	Wavrin	D'azur, à l'écusson d'argent.	Azure, an inescutcheon argent. (Gouzeaucourt, Saint-Jean-de-Vals, Ramburelles, Saint-Menge, Colombey-les-Belles and Ostreville use the same arms.)
	Wazemmes; Former commune merged into Lille in 1858	D'azur semé de fleurs de lis d'or, à une tour d'argent brochant sur le tout, et sommée de deux crosses d'or en sautoir.	Azure semy de lys Or, a tower argent issuant from which 2 croziers (bases in saltire) Or.
	Waziers	D'azur à l'écusson d'argent, à la bande de gueules brochant sur le tout.	Azure, a inescutcheon argent, overall a bend gules.
	Wemaers-Cappel	Ecartelé : aux 1 et 4, d'azur au dragon d'or, armé et lampassé de gueules; aux 2 et 3, d'argent à trois chevrons de gueules.	Quarterly 1&4: Azure, a wyvern Or armed and langued gules; 2&3: Argent, 3 chevrons gules.
	Wervicq-Sud	D'or à la bande de gueules, accompagnée de six quintefeuilles du même ordonnées en orle.	Or, a bend between 6 cinqfoils in orle gules.
	West-Cappel	D'argent à la bande fuselée de gueules.	Argent, a bend fusil gules. (probably not heraldically significantly different from Noordpeene)
	Wicres	De sinople à la fasce d'hermine.	Vert, a fess ermine. (Oignies, Beaucamps-Ligny, Estrées, Gruson and Wicres use the same arms.)
	Wignehies	D'azur semé de fleurs de lis d'or.	Azure, semy de lys Or. = France Ancient (Ansacq, Brillon, Escaudain, Escautpont, Hélesmes, Hérin, Lecelles, Lieu-Saint-Amand, Lourches, Neuville-sur-Escaut, Rosult, Rumegies and Wignehies use the same arms.)
	Willems	De gueules au chevron d'argent accompagné de trois pommes de pin d'or.	Gules, a chevron argent between 3 pinecones Or.
	Willies	De gueules à deux fasces bretessées et contre-bretessées d'argent; au franc-canton de gueules à trois pals de vair et au chef d'or.	Gules, 2 fesses embattled counterembattled argent, overall on a canton Gules, 3 pales vair and a chief Or. (Baives and Willies use the same arms.)
	Winnezeele	D'argent à quatre losanges de gueules, celle du chef à dextre cachée par un franc-quartier d'or à deux fasces de gueules.	Argent, 4 lozenges gules, on a canton Or 2 fesses gules. (NB: one of the lozenges is covered by the canton).
	Wormhout	D'or au lion de sable armé et lampassé de gueules. Ancien Blason : D'argent au lion de sable.	Or, a lion sable armed and langued gules. ('Flanders' and the communes of Thourotte, Crépy-en-Valois, Bollezeele, Feignies, Flines-lez-Raches and Wormhout use the same arms.)
	Wulverdinghe	Fascé d'or et d'azur de huit pièces, à trois annelets de gueules brochant sur les deux premières fasces en chef.	Barry Or and azure, in chief in fess 3 annulets gules. (Wulverdinghe and Westrehem use the same arms.)
	Wylder	D'argent à cinq cors de chasse de sable liés de gueules.	Argent, 5 hunting horns sable tied gules.

== Z ==
Image	Name of Commune	French original blazon	English blazon
	Zegerscappel	D'or à la fasce de sable, accompagné de six billettes du même, trois en chef et trois en pointe. variante : D'argent à la fasce de sable, accompagné de six billettes du même, trois en chef et trois en pointe.	Or, a fess sable between 6 billets sable, both sets of 3 in fess.
	Zermezeele	D'argent au chef de gueules, et un bâton de sable brochant en bande sur le tout.	Argent, a chief gules, overall a bendlet sable.
	Zuydcoote	D'argent à l'aigle à deux têtes éployée de sable, becquée et onglée de gueules, accostée de deux lions affrontés de sable, armés et lampassés de gueules.	Argent, a doubleheaded eagle displayed sable, beaked and armed gules, between 2 lions respectant sable, armed and langued gules.
	Zuytpeene	D'azur à une fasce d'or, accompagnée de dix-sept billettes couchées du même, 5 et 4 en chef, 4, 3 et 1 en pointe.	Azure, a fess between 17 billets Or, arranged 5 and 4 in chief and 4,3 and 1 in base.
