= Terdeghem =

Terdeghem Terdegem
- Commune
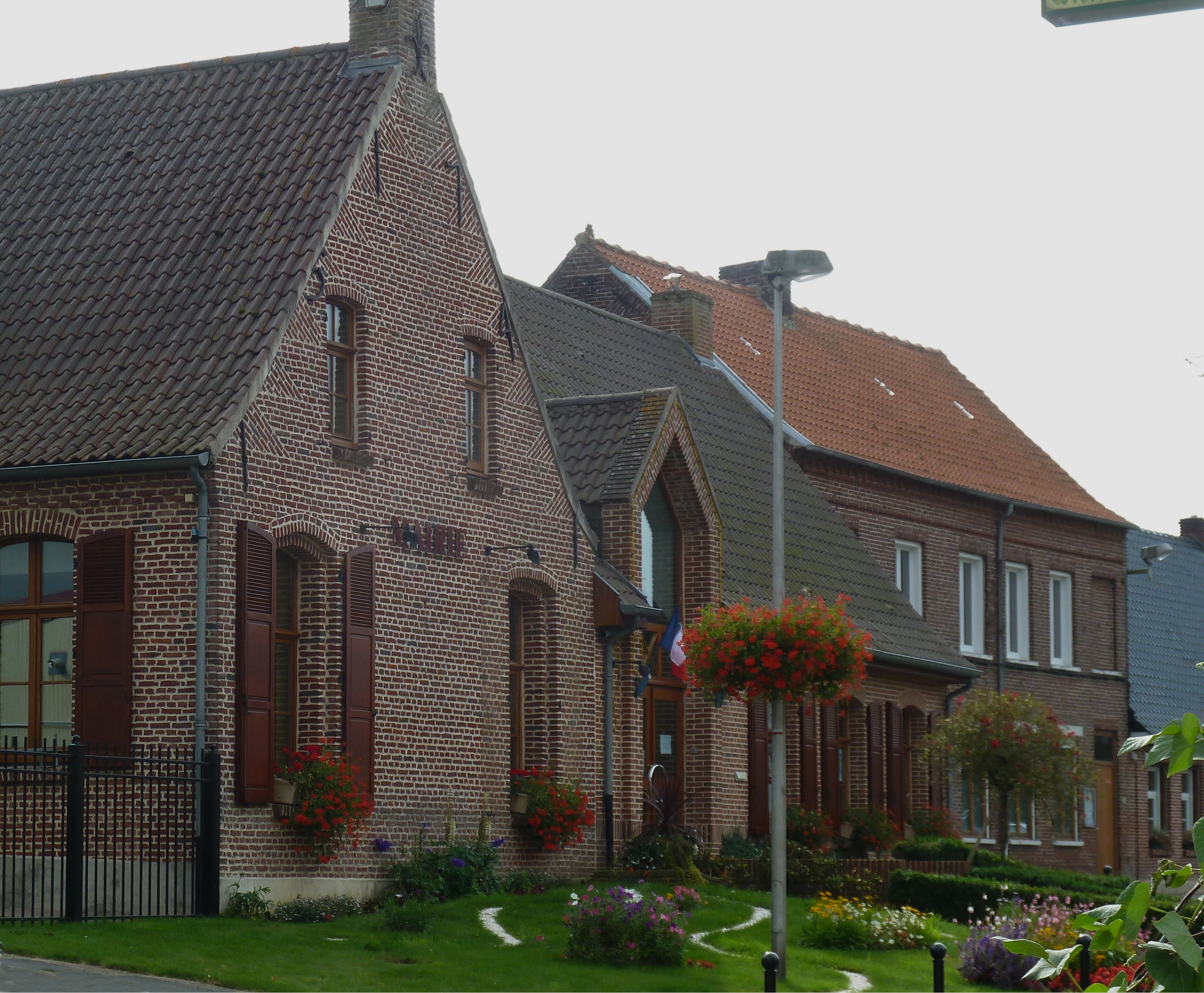
- The town hall in Terdeghem

- Coat of arms
- Location of Terdeghem
- Location within France Location within Hauts-de-France
- Coordinates: 50°47′56″N 2°32′27″E
- Country: France
- Region: Hauts-de-France
- Department: Nord
- Arrondissement: Dunkerque
- Canton: Wormhout
- Intercommunality: CA Cœur de Flandre

Government
  - Mayor (2021–2026): Virginie Leserne Delestre
- Area^{1}: 8.82 km^{2} (3.41 sq mi)
- Elevation: 28 m (92 ft)
- Highest elevation: 80 m (260 ft)
- Lowest elevation: 19 m (62 ft)
- Population (2023): 519
  - Density: 58.8/km^{2} (152/sq mi)
- Time zone: UTC+01:00 (CET)
  - Summer (DST): UTC+02:00 (CEST)
- INSEE/Postal code: 59587 /59114
- ^{1} French Land Register data, which excludes lakes, ponds, glaciers > 1 km^{2} (0.386 sq mi or 247 acres) and river estuaries.

Terdeghem (French pronunciation: [tɛʁdəɡɛm]; from Flemish; Terdegem in modern Dutch spelling) is a commune in the Nord department in northern France.

== Heraldry ==
Arms of Terdeghem	The arms of Terdeghem are blazoned : Azure, 3 bars gemel Or. (Terdeghem and Beaufort-Blavincourt use the same arms.)

== See also ==
- Communes of the Nord department
