= Wargnies-le-Grand =

- Commune
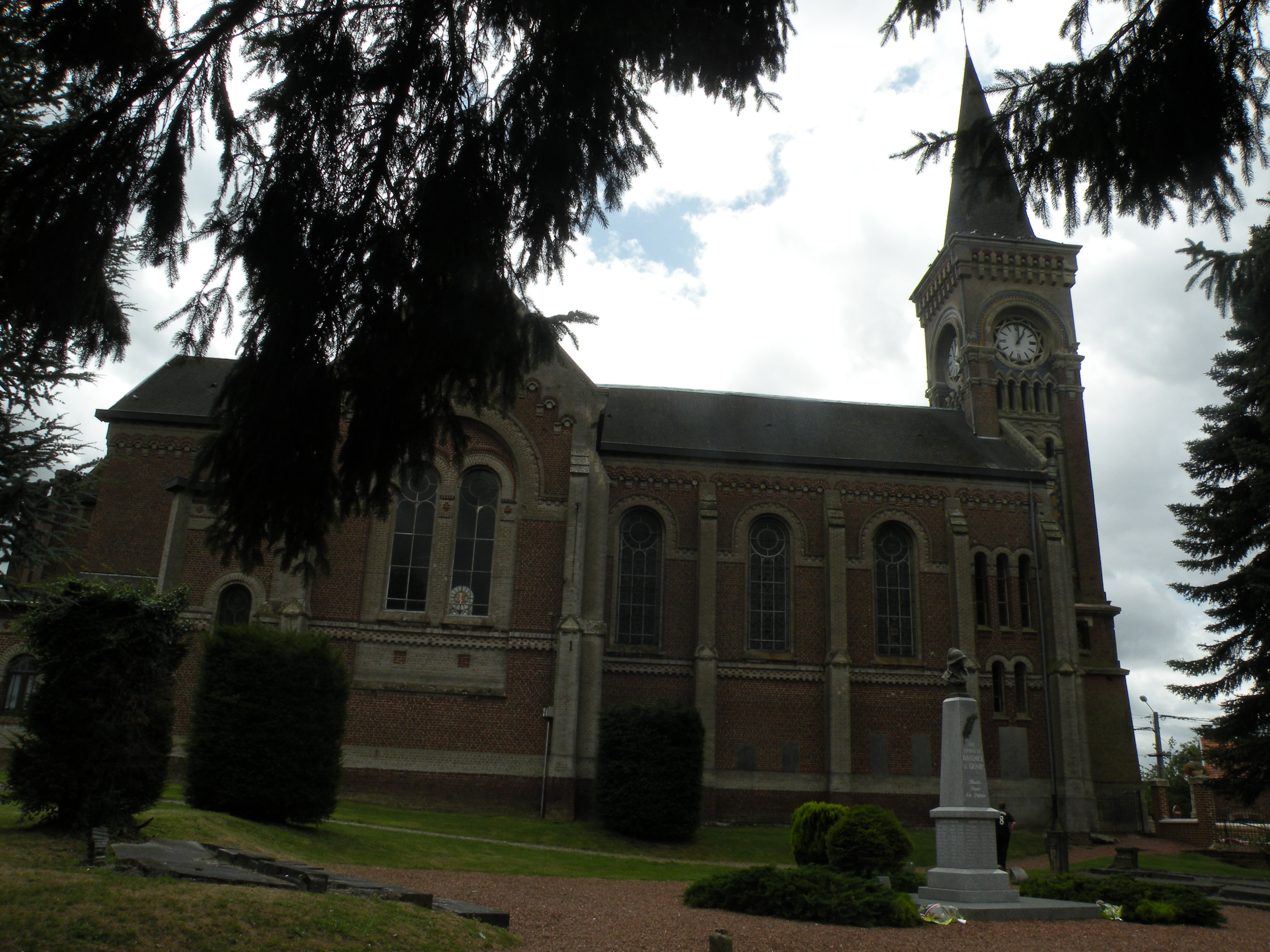
- The church in Wargnies-le-Grand

- Coat of arms
- Location of Wargnies-le-Grand
- Location within France Location within Hauts-de-France
- Coordinates: 50°18′32″N 3°39′40″E
- Country: France
- Region: Hauts-de-France
- Department: Nord
- Arrondissement: Avesnes-sur-Helpe
- Canton: Aulnoye-Aymeries
- Intercommunality: Pays de Mormal

Government
  - Mayor (2020–2026): Catherine Morel
- Area^{1}: 5.68 km^{2} (2.19 sq mi)
- Elevation: 83 m (272 ft)
- Highest elevation: 116 m (381 ft)
- Lowest elevation: 57 m (187 ft)
- Population (2023): 1,125
  - Density: 198/km^{2} (513/sq mi)
- Time zone: UTC+01:00 (CET)
  - Summer (DST): UTC+02:00 (CEST)
- INSEE/Postal code: 59639 /59144
- ^{1} French Land Register data, which excludes lakes, ponds, glaciers > 1 km^{2} (0.386 sq mi or 247 acres) and river estuaries.

Wargnies-le-Grand (French pronunciation: [waʁɲi lə ɡʁɑ̃]) is a commune in the Nord department in northern France.

== Heraldry ==
Arms of Wargnies-le-Grand	The arms of Wargnies-le-Grand are blazoned : Bendy argent and gules. (La Flamengrie, Fournes-en-Weppes and Wargnies-le-Grand use the same arms.)

== Population ==
Historical population
Year	Pop.	±% p.a.
1968	782	—
1975	782	+0.00%
1982	1,000	+3.58%
1990	1,018	+0.22%
1999	1,048	+0.32%
2007	1,051	+0.04%
2012	1,060	+0.17%
2017	1,101	+0.76%
2023	1,125	+0.36%
Source: INSEE

== See also ==
- Communes of the Nord department
