= Thun-Saint-Amand =

- Commune
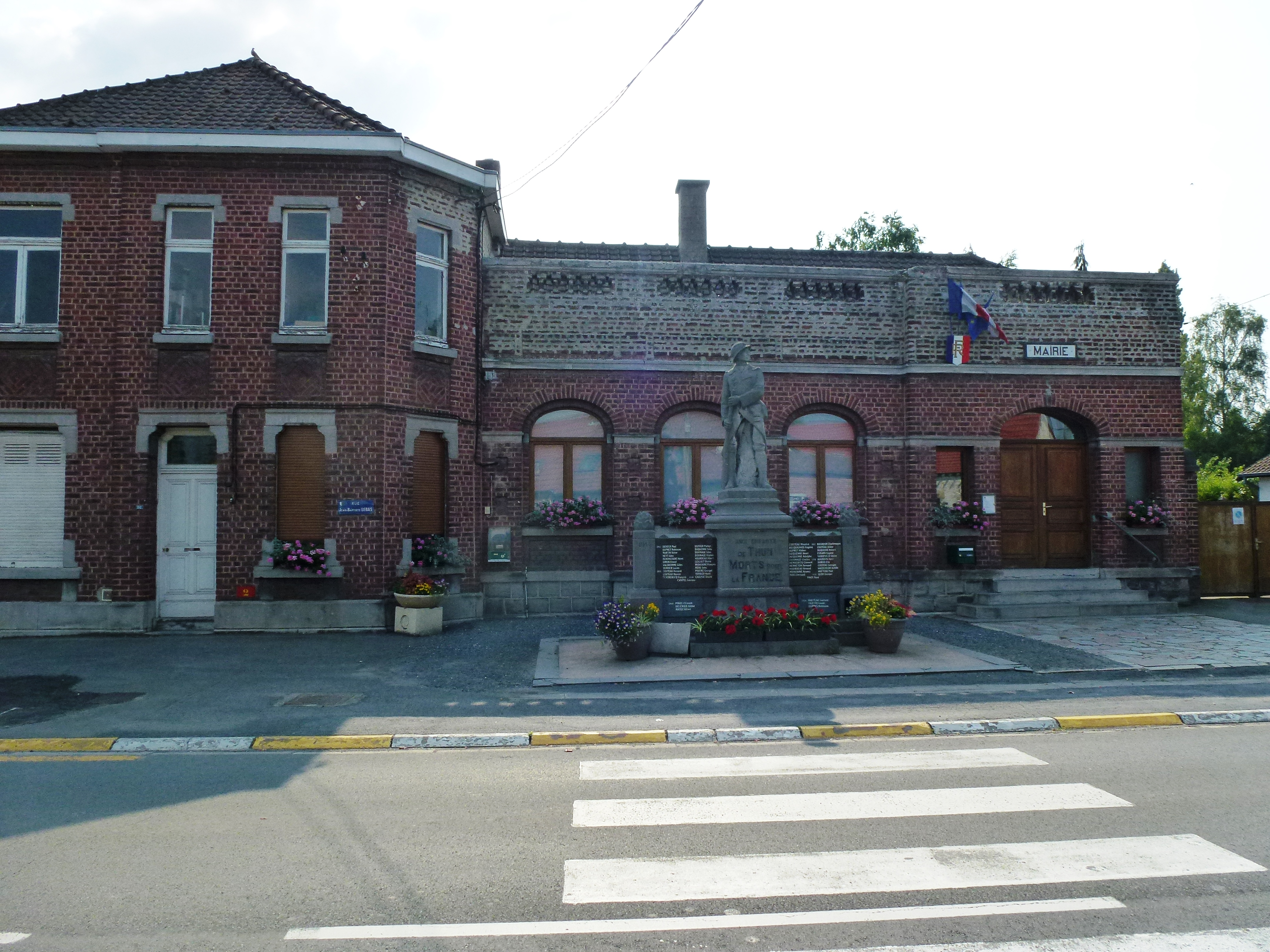
- The town hall in Thun-Saint-Amand

- Coat of arms
- Location of Thun-Saint-Amand
- Location within France Location within Hauts-de-France
- Coordinates: 50°28′51″N 3°27′35″E
- Country: France
- Region: Hauts-de-France
- Department: Nord
- Arrondissement: Valenciennes
- Canton: Saint-Amand-les-Eaux
- Intercommunality: CA Porte du Hainaut

Government
  - Mayor (2020–2026): Jean-Noël Broquet
- Area^{1}: 3.71 km^{2} (1.43 sq mi)
- Elevation: 22 m (72 ft)
- Highest elevation: 38 m (125 ft)
- Lowest elevation: 14 m (46 ft)
- Population (2023): 1,106
  - Density: 298/km^{2} (772/sq mi)
- Time zone: UTC+01:00 (CET)
  - Summer (DST): UTC+02:00 (CEST)
- INSEE/Postal code: 59594 /59158
- ^{1} French Land Register data, which excludes lakes, ponds, glaciers > 1 km^{2} (0.386 sq mi or 247 acres) and river estuaries.

Thun-Saint-Amand (French pronunciation: [tœ̃ sɛ̃.t‿amɑ̃]) is a commune in the Nord department in northern France.

== Heraldry ==
Arms of Thun-Saint-Amand	The arms of Thun-Saint-Amand are blazoned : Per pale highly indented argent and gules. (Cagnoncles, Landas, Raucourt-au-Bois and Thun-Saint-Amand use the same arms.)

== See also ==
- Communes of the Nord department
