= Roucourt, Nord =

Roucourt
- Commune
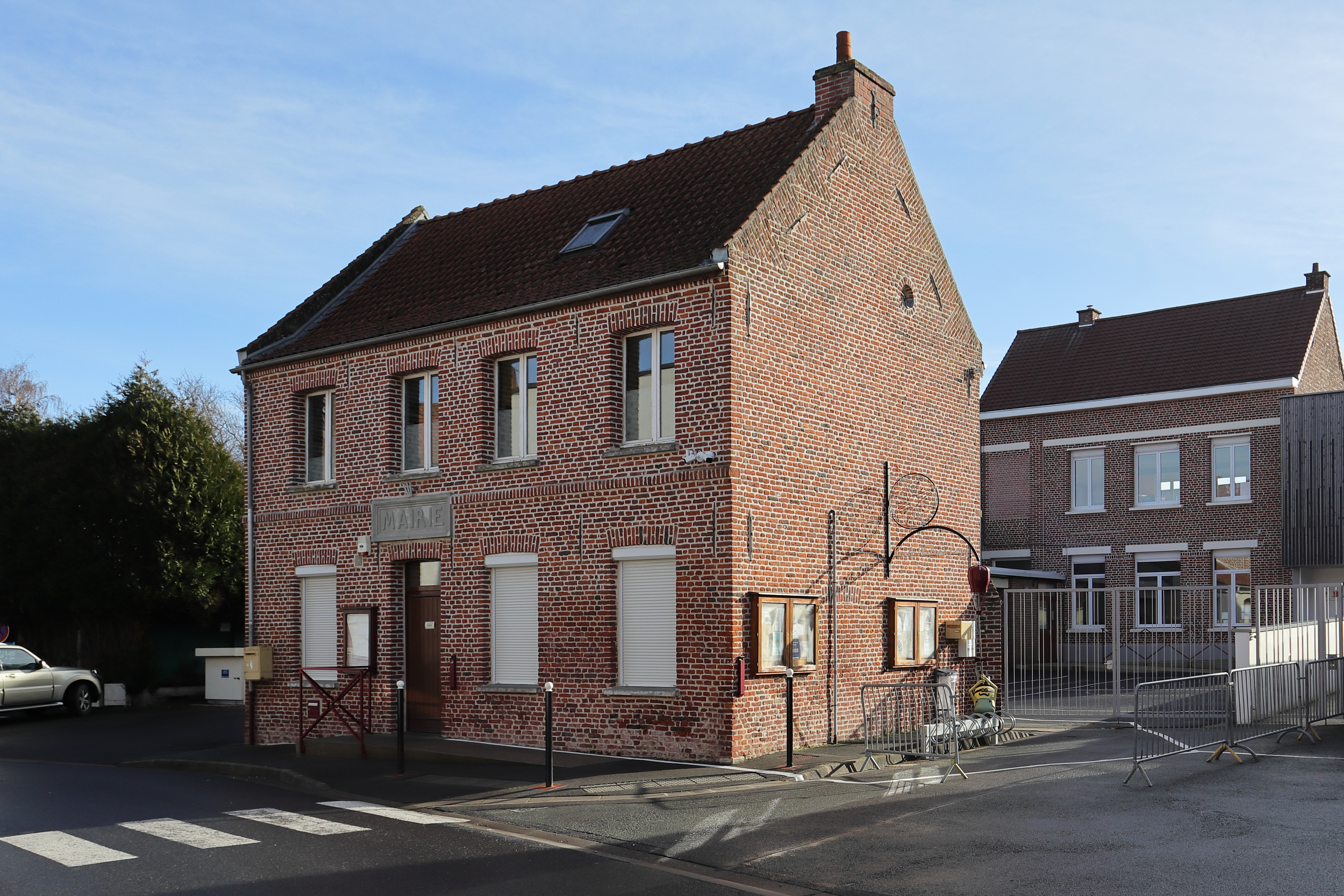
- The town hall in Roucourt

- Coat of arms
- Location of Roucourt
- Location within France Location within Hauts-de-France
- Coordinates: 50°19′41″N 3°08′56″E
- Country: France
- Region: Hauts-de-France
- Department: Nord
- Arrondissement: Douai
- Canton: Aniche
- Intercommunality: Douaisis Agglo

Government
  - Mayor (2020–2026): Pascal George
- Area^{1}: 3.19 km^{2} (1.23 sq mi)
- Elevation: 33 m (108 ft)
- Highest elevation: 67 m (220 ft)
- Lowest elevation: 32 m (105 ft)
- Population (2023): 456
  - Density: 143/km^{2} (370/sq mi)
- Time zone: UTC+01:00 (CET)
  - Summer (DST): UTC+02:00 (CEST)
- INSEE/Postal code: 59513 /59169
- ^{1} French Land Register data, which excludes lakes, ponds, glaciers > 1 km^{2} (0.386 sq mi or 247 acres) and river estuaries.

Roucourt (French pronunciation: [ʁukuʁ]) is a commune in Nord, a department in northern France. German Jagdstaffel 11 operated here on 13 April 1917.

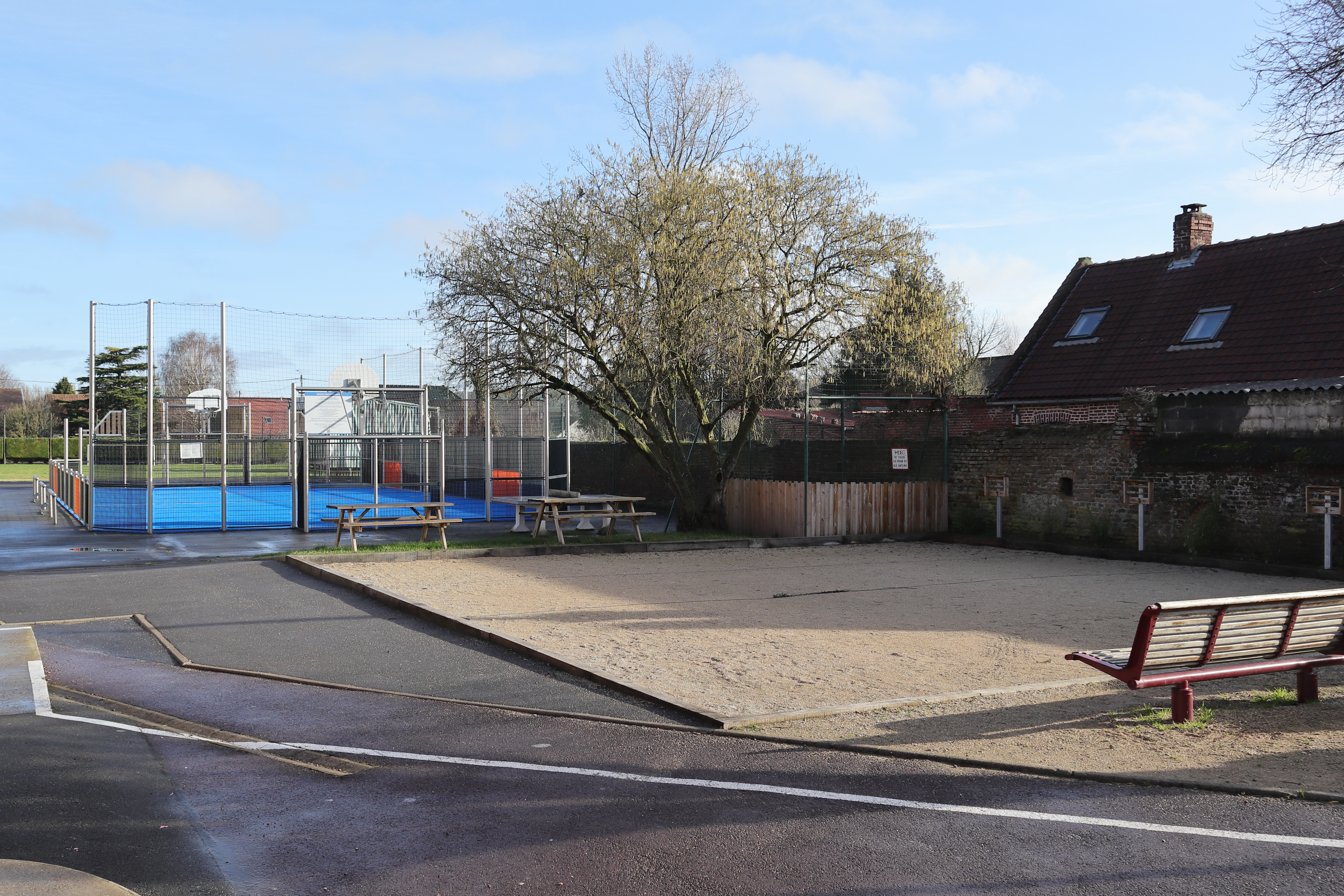
The city stadium

== Heraldry ==
Arms of Roucourt	The arms of Roucourt are blazoned : Quarterly Or and gules. (Cappelle-en-Pévèle and Roucourt use the same arms.)

== See also ==
- Communes of the Nord department
