= Vieux-Reng =

- Commune
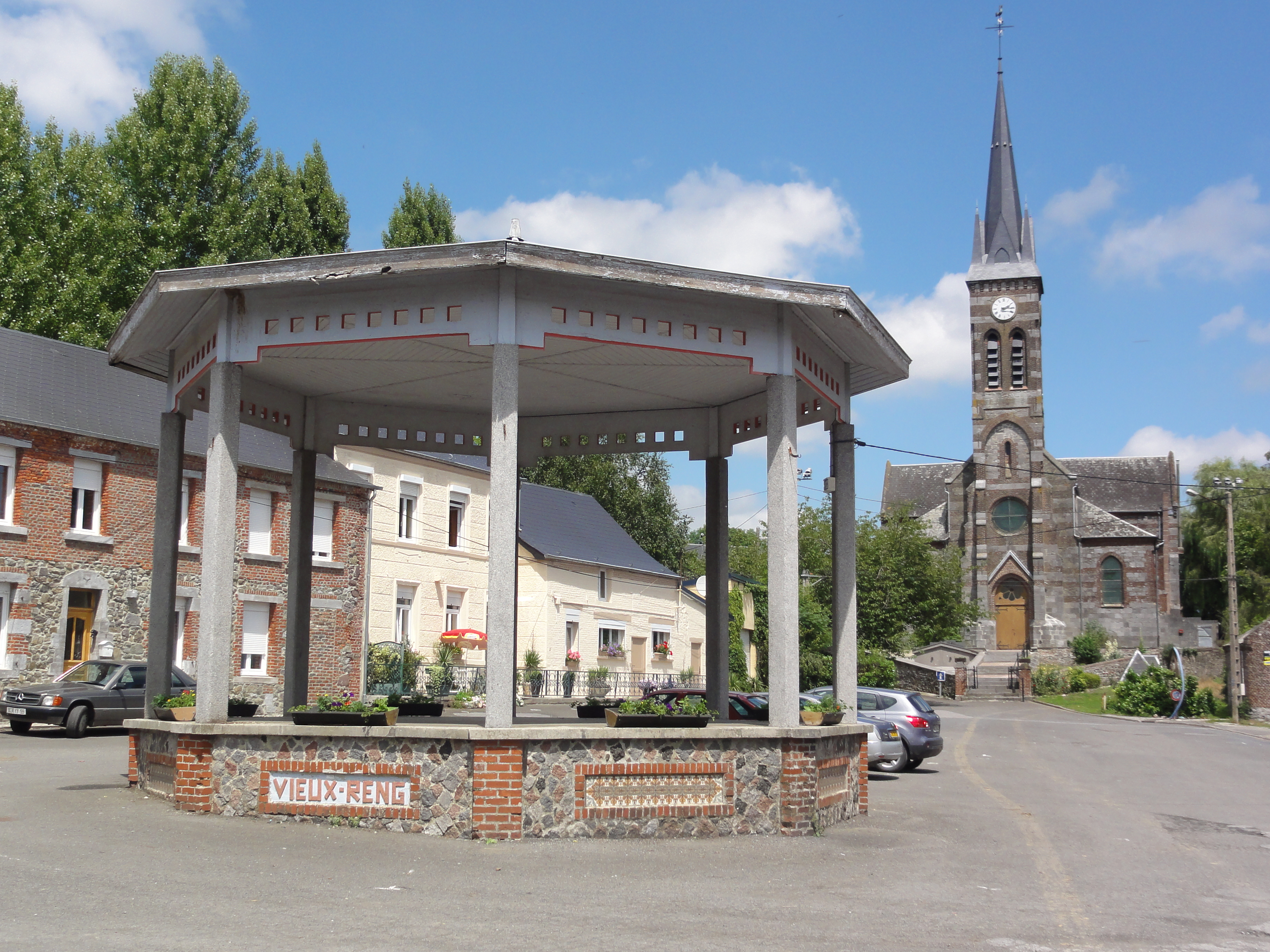
- The music kiosk in front of the church

- Coat of arms
- Location of Vieux-Reng
- Location within France Location within Hauts-de-France
- Coordinates: 50°19′48″N 4°02′52″E
- Country: France
- Region: Hauts-de-France
- Department: Nord
- Arrondissement: Avesnes-sur-Helpe
- Canton: Maubeuge
- Intercommunality: CA Maubeuge Val de Sambre

Government
  - Mayor (2020–2026): Jean-Pierre Manfroy
- Area^{1}: 11.64 km^{2} (4.49 sq mi)
- Elevation: 123 m (404 ft)
- Highest elevation: 148 m (486 ft)
- Lowest elevation: 113 m (371 ft)
- Population (2023): 938
  - Density: 80.6/km^{2} (209/sq mi)
- Time zone: UTC+01:00 (CET)
  - Summer (DST): UTC+02:00 (CEST)
- INSEE/Postal code: 59618 /59600
- ^{1} French Land Register data, which excludes lakes, ponds, glaciers > 1 km^{2} (0.386 sq mi or 247 acres) and river estuaries.

Vieux-Reng (French pronunciation: [vjø ʁɑ̃]) is a commune in the Nord department in northern France.

Its neighbouring village across the border with Belgium is called Grand-Reng.

== Heraldry ==
| Arms of Vieux-Reng | The arms of Vieux-Reng are blazoned : Gules, a mullet of 12 Or. |

== See also ==
- Communes of the Nord department
