= Raucourt-au-Bois =

- Commune
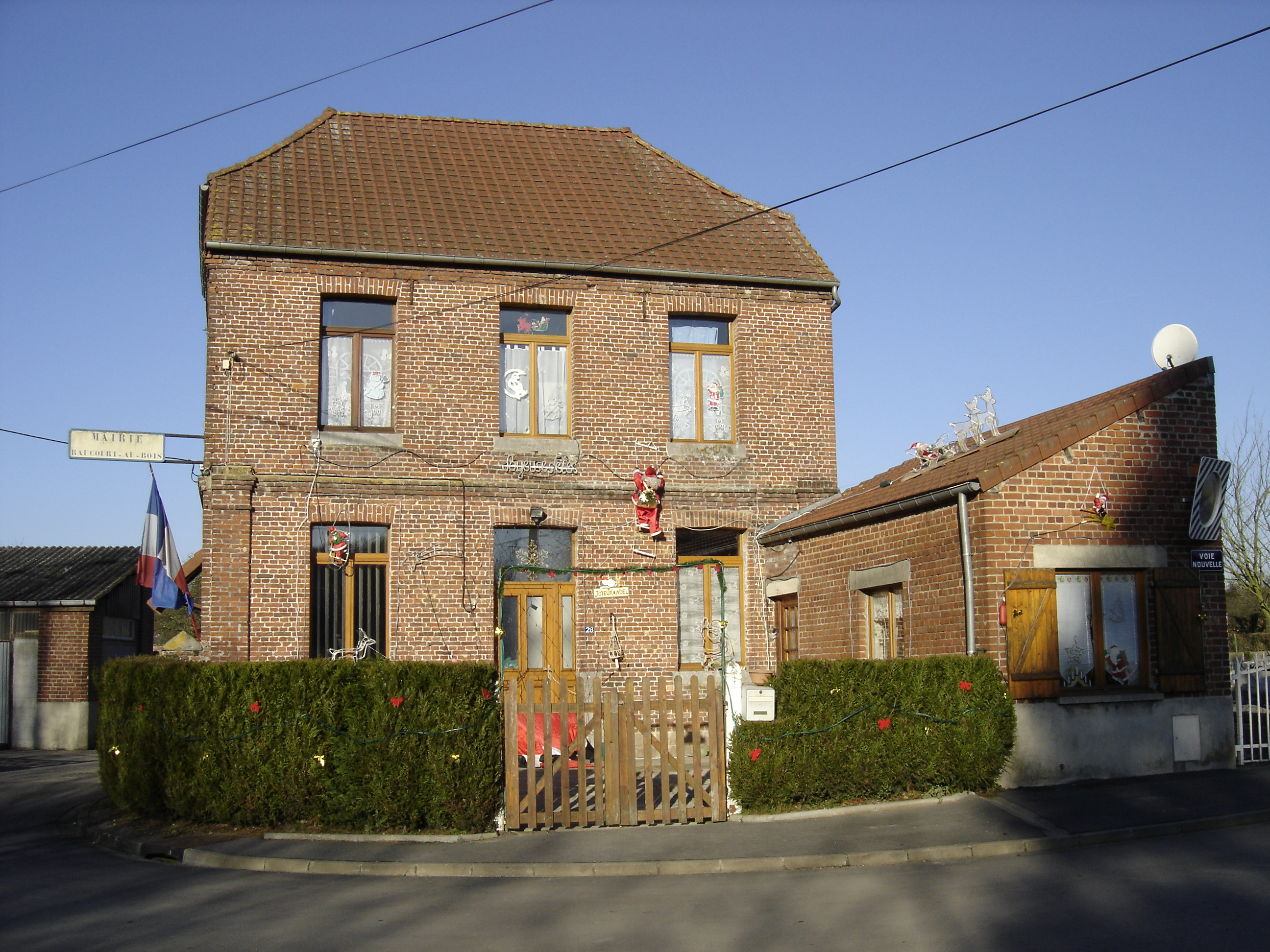
- The town hall in Raucourt-au-Bois

- Coat of arms
- Location of Raucourt-au-Bois
- Location within France Location within Hauts-de-France
- Coordinates: 50°12′38″N 3°39′40″E
- Country: France
- Region: Hauts-de-France
- Department: Nord
- Arrondissement: Avesnes-sur-Helpe
- Canton: Avesnes-sur-Helpe
- Intercommunality: Pays de Mormal

Government
  - Mayor (2020–2026): Jean-Pierre Noël
- Area^{1}: 1.04 km^{2} (0.40 sq mi)
- Elevation: 103 m (338 ft)
- Highest elevation: 148 m (486 ft)
- Lowest elevation: 131 m (430 ft)
- Population (2023): 150
  - Density: 140/km^{2} (370/sq mi)
- Time zone: UTC+01:00 (CET)
  - Summer (DST): UTC+02:00 (CEST)
- INSEE/Postal code: 59494 /59530
- ^{1} French Land Register data, which excludes lakes, ponds, glaciers > 1 km^{2} (0.386 sq mi or 247 acres) and river estuaries.

Raucourt-au-Bois (French pronunciation: [ʁokuʁ o bwa]) is a commune in the Nord department in northern France.

== Heraldry ==
Arms of Raucourt-au-Bois	The arms of Raucourt-au-Bois are blazoned : Per pale highly indented argent and gules. (Cagnoncles, Landas, Raucourt-au-Bois and Thun-Saint-Amand use the same arms.)

== See also ==
- Communes of the Nord department
