= Landas =

- Commune
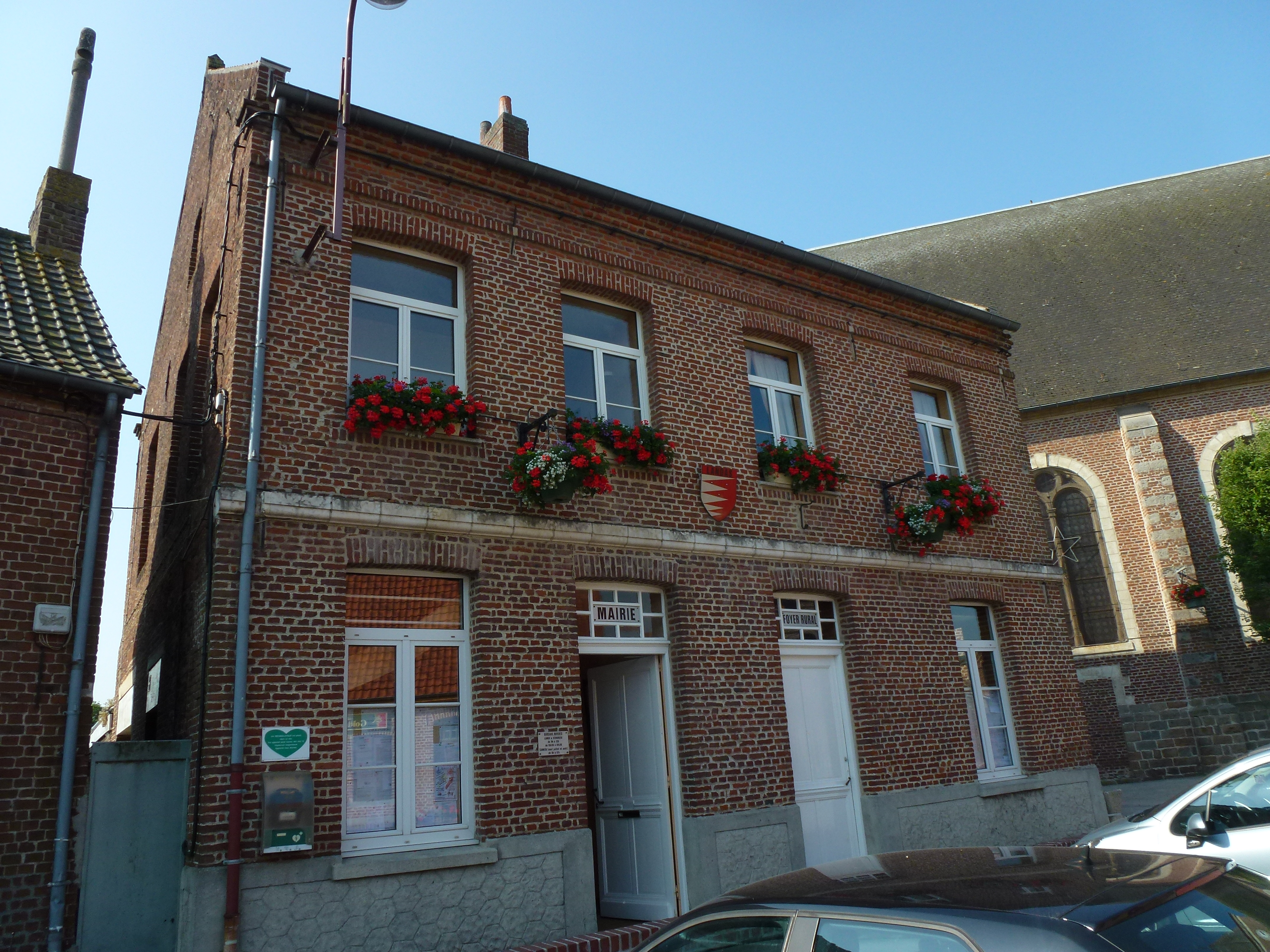
- The town hall in Landas

- Coat of arms
- Location of Landas
- Location within France Location within Hauts-de-France
- Coordinates: 50°28′27″N 3°18′08″E
- Country: France
- Region: Hauts-de-France
- Department: Nord
- Arrondissement: Douai
- Canton: Orchies
- Intercommunality: CC Pévèle-Carembault

Government
  - Mayor (2020–2026): Jean-Louis Dauchy
- Area^{1}: 11.95 km^{2} (4.61 sq mi)
- Elevation: 40 m (130 ft)
- Highest elevation: 48 m (157 ft)
- Lowest elevation: 18 m (59 ft)
- Population (2023): 2,518
  - Density: 210.7/km^{2} (545.7/sq mi)
- Time zone: UTC+01:00 (CET)
  - Summer (DST): UTC+02:00 (CEST)
- INSEE/Postal code: 59330 /59310
- ^{1} French Land Register data, which excludes lakes, ponds, glaciers > 1 km^{2} (0.386 sq mi or 247 acres) and river estuaries.

Landas (French pronunciation: [lɑ̃da]) is a commune in the Nord department in northern France.

== Population ==
Historical population
Year	Pop.	±% p.a.
1968	1,706	—
1975	1,838	+1.07%
1982	2,006	+1.26%
1990	2,038	+0.20%
1999	2,261	+1.16%
2007	2,341	+0.44%
2012	2,388	+0.40%
2017	2,399	+0.09%
2023	2,518	+0.81%
Source: INSEE

== Heraldry ==
Arms of Landas	The arms of Landas are blazoned : Per pale highly indented argent and gules. (Cagnoncles, Landas, Raucourt-au-Bois and Thun-Saint-Amand use the same arms.)

== See also ==
- Communes of the Nord department
