= Socx =

Socx Soks
- Commune
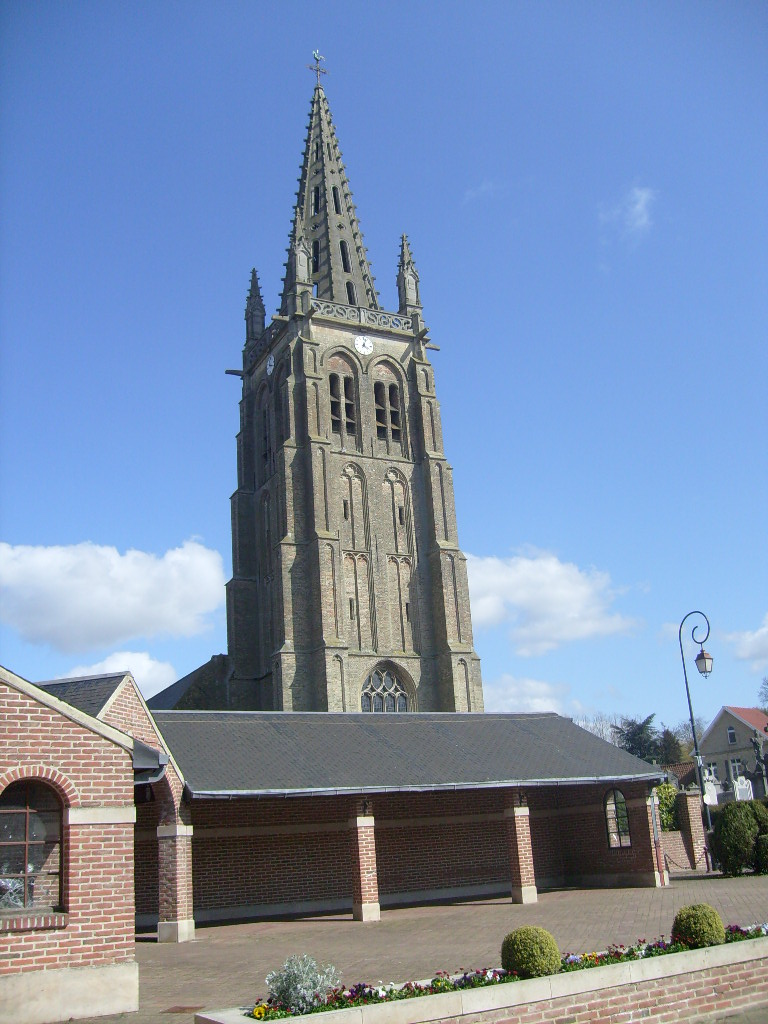
- The church in Socx

- Coat of arms
- Location of Socx
- Location within France Location within Hauts-de-France
- Coordinates: 50°56′10″N 2°25′32″E
- Country: France
- Region: Hauts-de-France
- Department: Nord
- Arrondissement: Dunkerque
- Canton: Wormhout
- Intercommunality: CC Hauts de Flandre

Government
  - Mayor (2020–2026): Alexandre Rommelaere
- Area^{1}: 8 km^{2} (3.1 sq mi)
- Elevation: 13 m (43 ft)
- Highest elevation: 31 m (102 ft)
- Lowest elevation: 0 m (0 ft)
- Population (2023): 869
  - Density: 110/km^{2} (280/sq mi)
- Demonym: Socxois (es)
- Time zone: UTC+01:00 (CET)
  - Summer (DST): UTC+02:00 (CEST)
- INSEE/Postal code: 59570 /59380
- ^{1} French Land Register data, which excludes lakes, ponds, glaciers > 1 km^{2} (0.386 sq mi or 247 acres) and river estuaries.

Socx (French pronunciation: [sɔks]; from Flemish; Soks in modern Dutch spelling) is a commune in the Nord department in northern France. The population in 2019 was 923.

== Geography ==
Socx is around 10 km (6.2 mi) south of Dunkirk. Its area is 8 km^{2} (3.1 sq mi).

== Heraldry ==
| Arms of Socx | The arms of Socx are blazoned : Argent, a lion sable armed and langued within a bordure gules. (Quaëdypre and Socx use the same arms.) |

== Governance and politics ==
The current mayor is Alexandre Rommelaere, elected in 2020. Previous mayors were Christian Ley (term of office: 2008–2020) and Charles Vandaele (2001–2008).

== Twin towns ==
Socx was twinned with Caton, Lancashire, United Kingdom on 12 April 2008.

== See also ==
- Communes of the Nord department
