= Selvigny =

Coordinates: 50°05′N 3°21′E

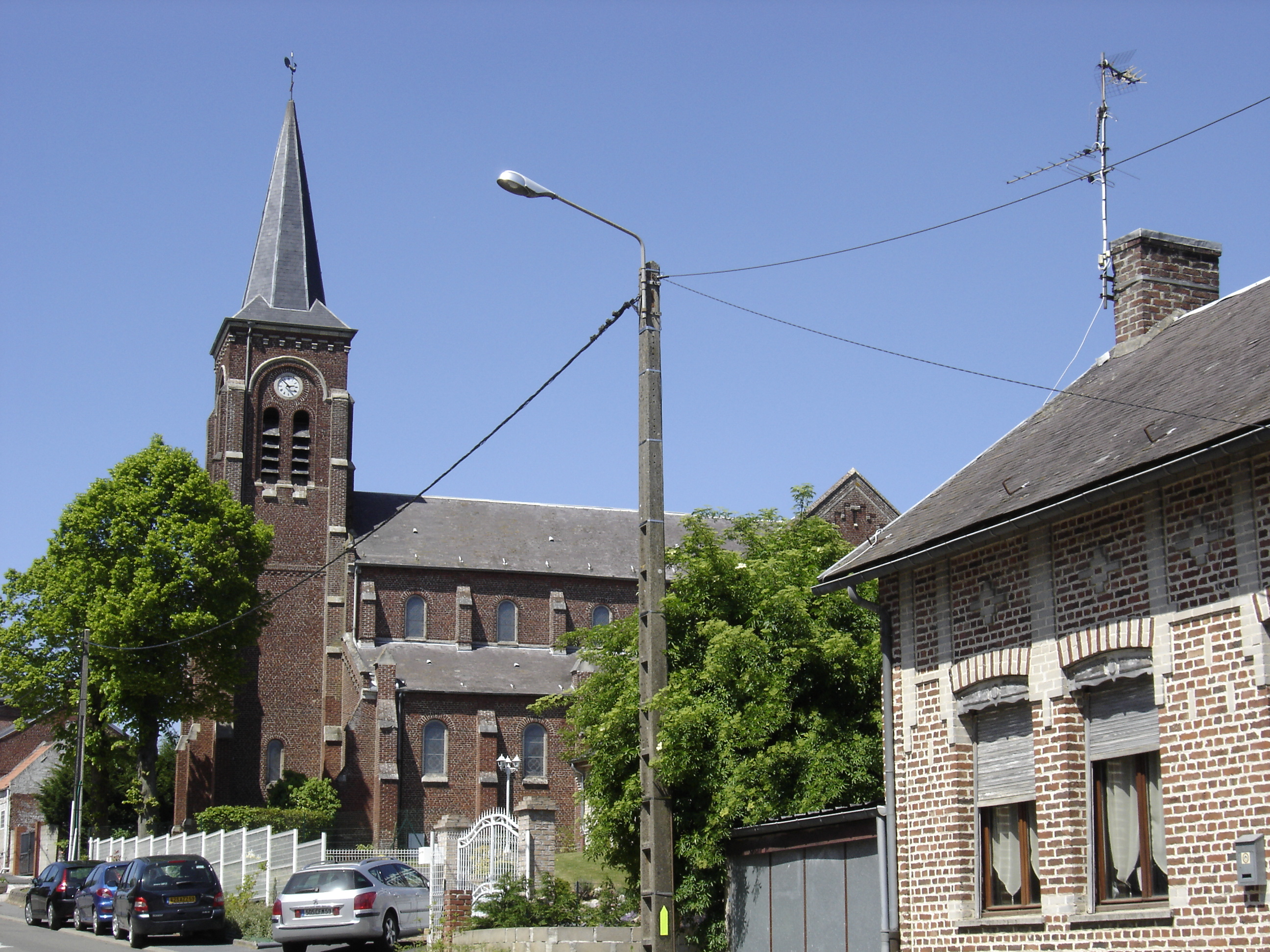
Church of Selvigny

Selvigny is a former commune in the Nord department in northern France, merged in 1972 with Walincourt to create Walincourt-Selvigny. Its population is 389 (2022).

== Heraldry ==
Arms of Selvigny	The arms of Selvigny are blazoned : Azure, on a fess or between 3 six petalled roses argent, 3 crosses patonce sable.

== See also ==
- Communes of the Nord department
