= Cagnoncles =

- Commune
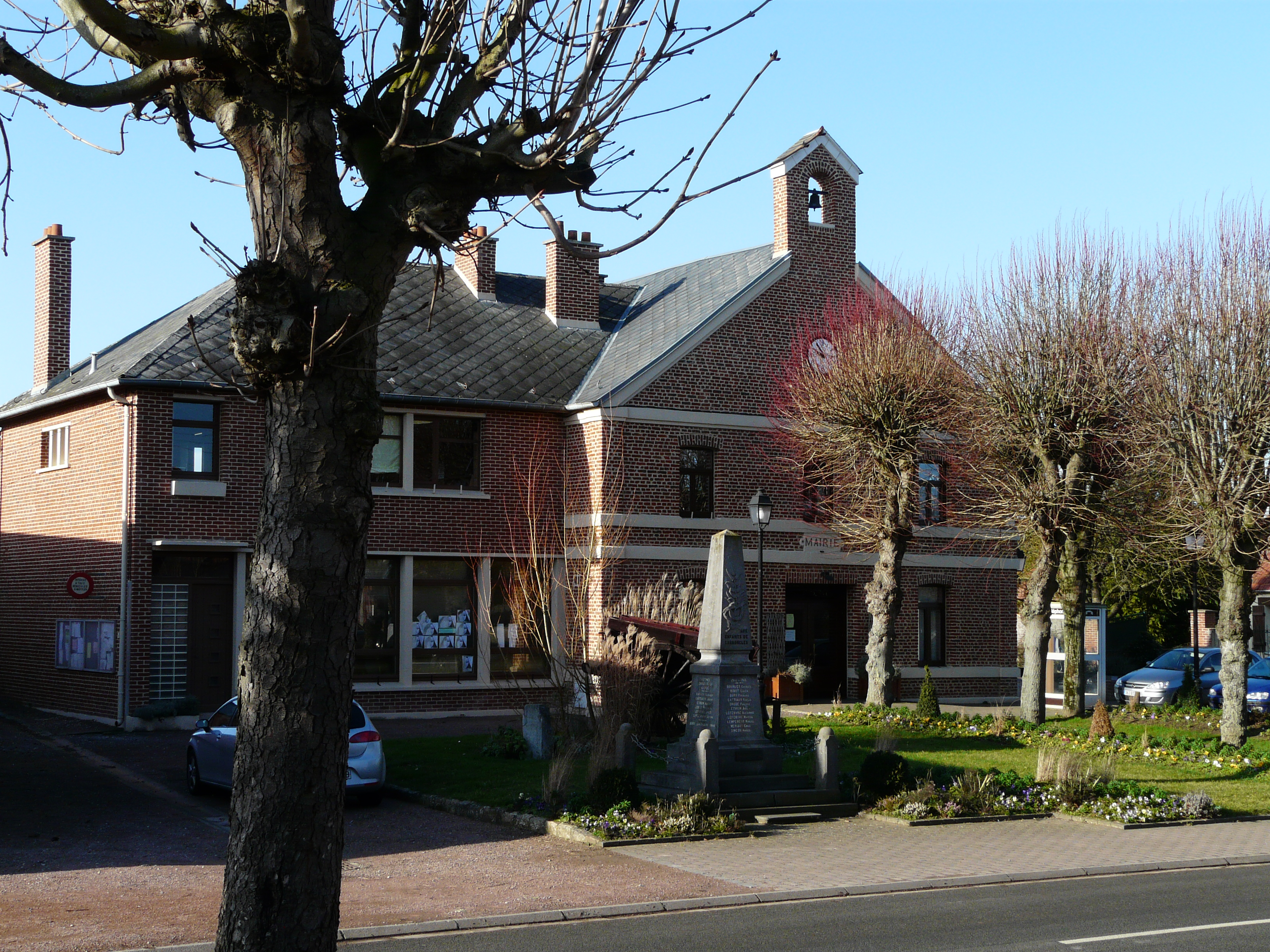
- The town hall in Cagnoncles

- Coat of arms
- Location of Cagnoncles
- Location within France Location within Hauts-de-France
- Coordinates: 50°11′28″N 3°18′40″E
- Country: France
- Region: Hauts-de-France
- Department: Nord
- Arrondissement: Cambrai
- Canton: Caudry
- Intercommunality: CA Cambrai

Government
  - Mayor (2020–2026): Bruno Lefebvre
- Area^{1}: 6.23 km^{2} (2.41 sq mi)
- Elevation: 67 m (220 ft)
- Highest elevation: 86 m (282 ft)
- Lowest elevation: 47 m (154 ft)
- Population (2023): 663
  - Density: 106/km^{2} (276/sq mi)
- Time zone: UTC+01:00 (CET)
  - Summer (DST): UTC+02:00 (CEST)
- INSEE/Postal code: 59121 /59161
- ^{1} French Land Register data, which excludes lakes, ponds, glaciers > 1 km^{2} (0.386 sq mi or 247 acres) and river estuaries.

Cagnoncles (French pronunciation: [kaɲɔ̃kl]) is a commune in the Nord department in northern France. It contains 11 Commonwealth war graves from the First World War.

== History ==
Private A S Bullock in his World War I memoir recalls arriving in Cagnoncles around 19 October 1918 to find the population near to starvation, and records that he and his fellow soldiers shared their rations with the local people.

== Heraldry ==
Arms of Cagnoncles	The arms of Cagnoncles are blazoned : Per pale highly indented argent and gules. (Cagnoncles, Landas, Raucourt-au-Bois and Thun-Saint-Amand use the same arms.)

== See also ==
- Communes of the Nord department
