= La Flamengrie, Nord =

La Flamengrie
- Commune
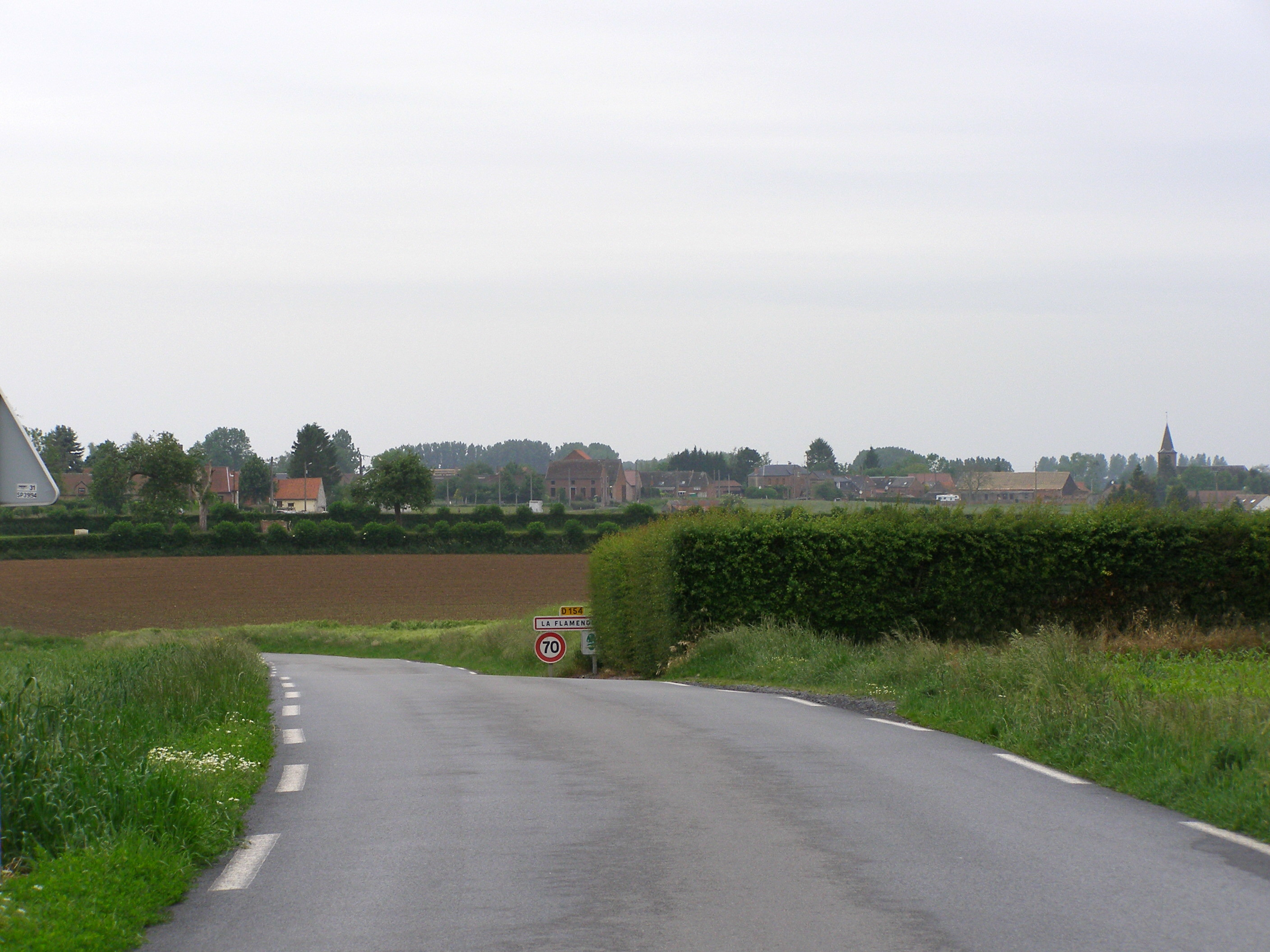
- A general view of La Flamengrie

- Coat of arms
- Location of La Flamengrie
- Location within France Location within Hauts-de-France
- Coordinates: 50°18′58″N 3°43′02″E
- Country: France
- Region: Hauts-de-France
- Department: Nord
- Arrondissement: Avesnes-sur-Helpe
- Canton: Aulnoye-Aymeries
- Intercommunality: CC Pays de Mormal

Government
  - Mayor (2020–2026): Yohan Lecerf
- Area^{1}: 2.03 km^{2} (0.78 sq mi)
- Elevation: 120 m (390 ft)
- Highest elevation: 132 m (433 ft)
- Lowest elevation: 108 m (354 ft)
- Population (2023): 431
  - Density: 212/km^{2} (550/sq mi)
- Time zone: UTC+01:00 (CET)
  - Summer (DST): UTC+02:00 (CEST)
- INSEE/Postal code: 59232 /59570
- ^{1} French Land Register data, which excludes lakes, ponds, glaciers > 1 km^{2} (0.386 sq mi or 247 acres) and river estuaries.

La Flamengrie (French pronunciation: [la flamɑ̃ɡʁi]) is a commune in the Nord department in northern France.

== Heraldry ==
Arms of La Flamengrie	The arms of La Flamengrie are blazoned : Bendy argent and gules. (La Flamengrie, Fournes-en-Weppes and Wargnies-le-Grand use the same arms.)

== See also ==
- Communes of the Nord department
