= Walincourt =

Former commune in France

Coordinates: 50°04′N 3°20′E

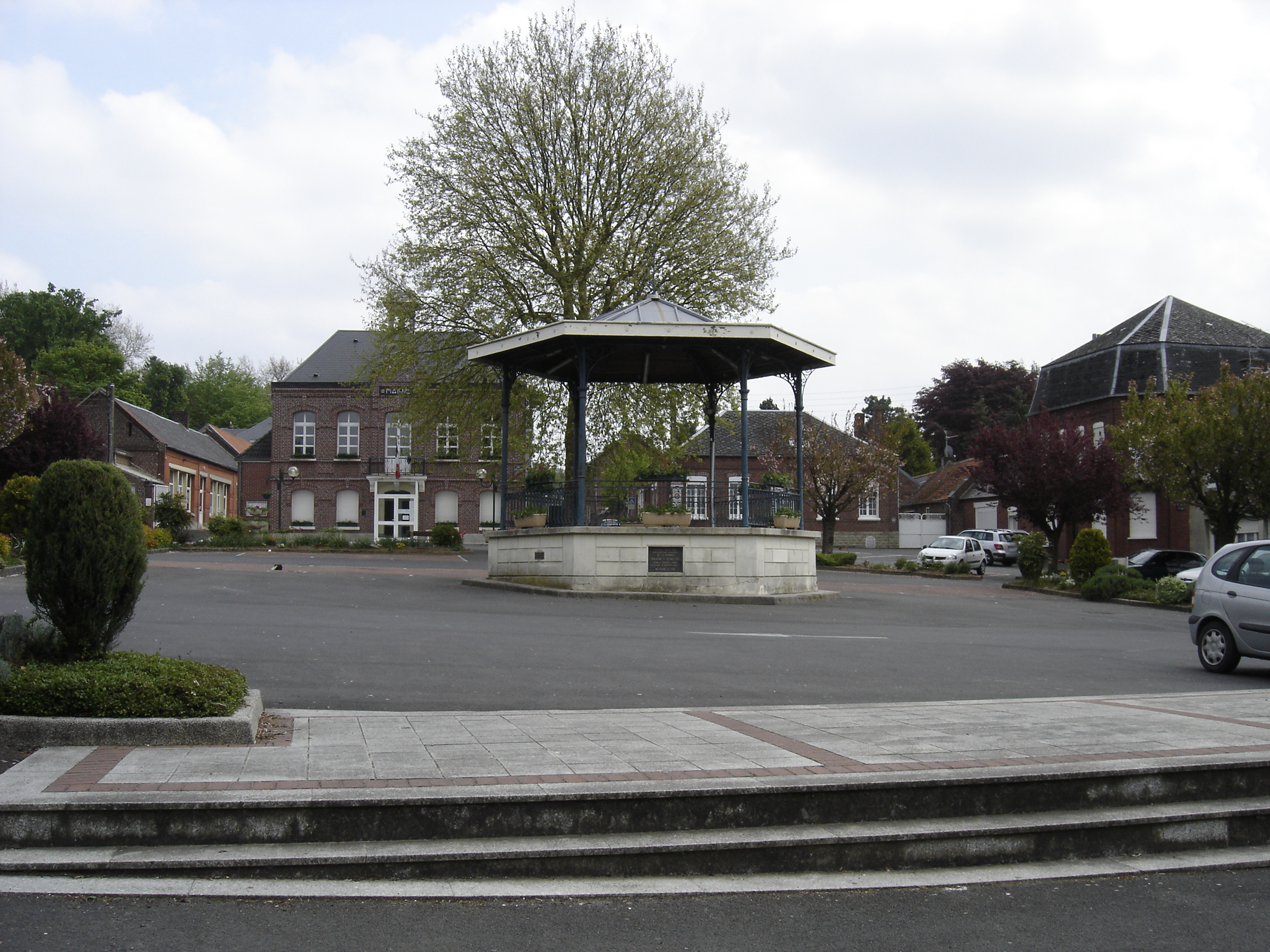
Center of Walincourt

Walincourt is a former commune in the Nord department in northern France, merged in October 1972 with Selvigny to create Walincourt-Selvigny.

== Heraldry ==
Arms of Walincourt	The arms of Walincourt are blazoned : Argent, a lion gules. (the Counts of Armagnac and the communes of Walincourt, Humerœuille, La Roche-Derrien, Sornac, Espelette, Gigean, Médis and Erquery use the same arms.)

== See also ==
- Communes of the Nord department
