= Quaëdypre =

- Commune
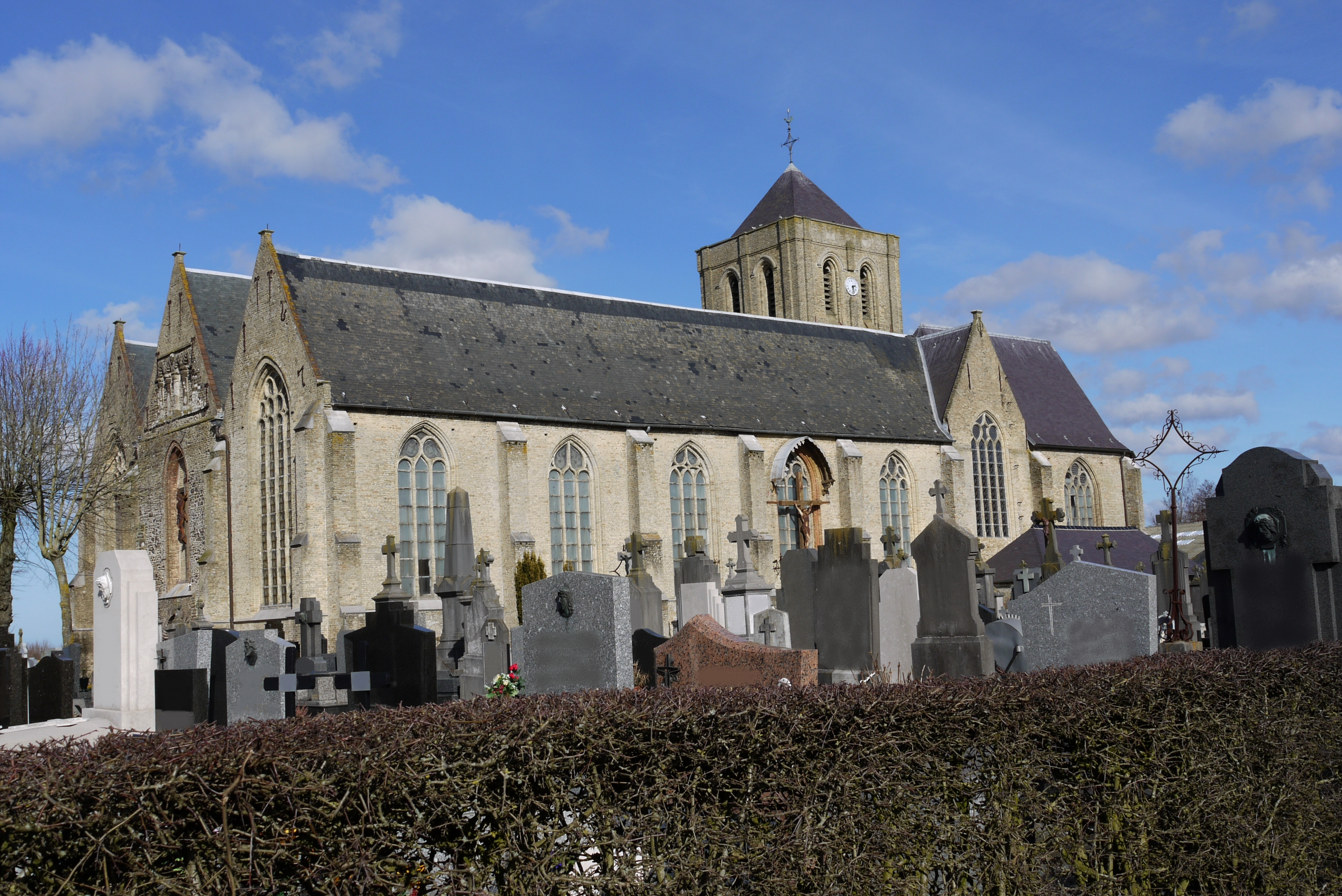
- The church in Quaëdypre

- Coat of arms
- Location of Quaëdypre
- Location within France Location within Hauts-de-France
- Coordinates: 50°56′12″N 2°27′18″E
- Country: France
- Region: Hauts-de-France
- Department: Nord
- Arrondissement: Dunkerque
- Canton: Wormhout
- Intercommunality: Hauts de Flandre

Government
  - Mayor (2020–2026): Jean-Claude Dekeister
- Area^{1}: 18.7 km^{2} (7.2 sq mi)
- Elevation: 29 m (95 ft)
- Highest elevation: 31 m (102 ft)
- Lowest elevation: 0 m (0 ft)
- Population (2023): 1,108
  - Density: 59.3/km^{2} (153/sq mi)
- Demonym(s): Quaëdyprois, Quaëdyproises
- Time zone: UTC+01:00 (CET)
  - Summer (DST): UTC+02:00 (CEST)
- INSEE/Postal code: 59478 /59380
- ^{1} French Land Register data, which excludes lakes, ponds, glaciers > 1 km^{2} (0.386 sq mi or 247 acres) and river estuaries.

Quaëdypre (French pronunciation: [kwadipʁ]; Dutch: Kwaadieper) is a commune in the Nord department in northern France.

== Population ==
Historical population
Year	Pop.	±% p.a.
1968	888	—
1975	919	+0.49%
1982	1,007	+1.31%
1990	1,111	+1.24%
1999	1,158	+0.46%
2007	1,138	−0.22%
2012	1,132	−0.11%
2017	1,095	−0.66%
2023	1,108	+0.20%
Source: INSEE

== Heraldry ==
Arms of Quaëdypre	The arms of Quaëdypre are blazoned : Argent, a lion sable armed and langued within a bordure gules. (Quaëdypre and Socx use the same arms.)

== See also ==
- Communes of the Nord department
