= Sains-du-Nord =

- Commune
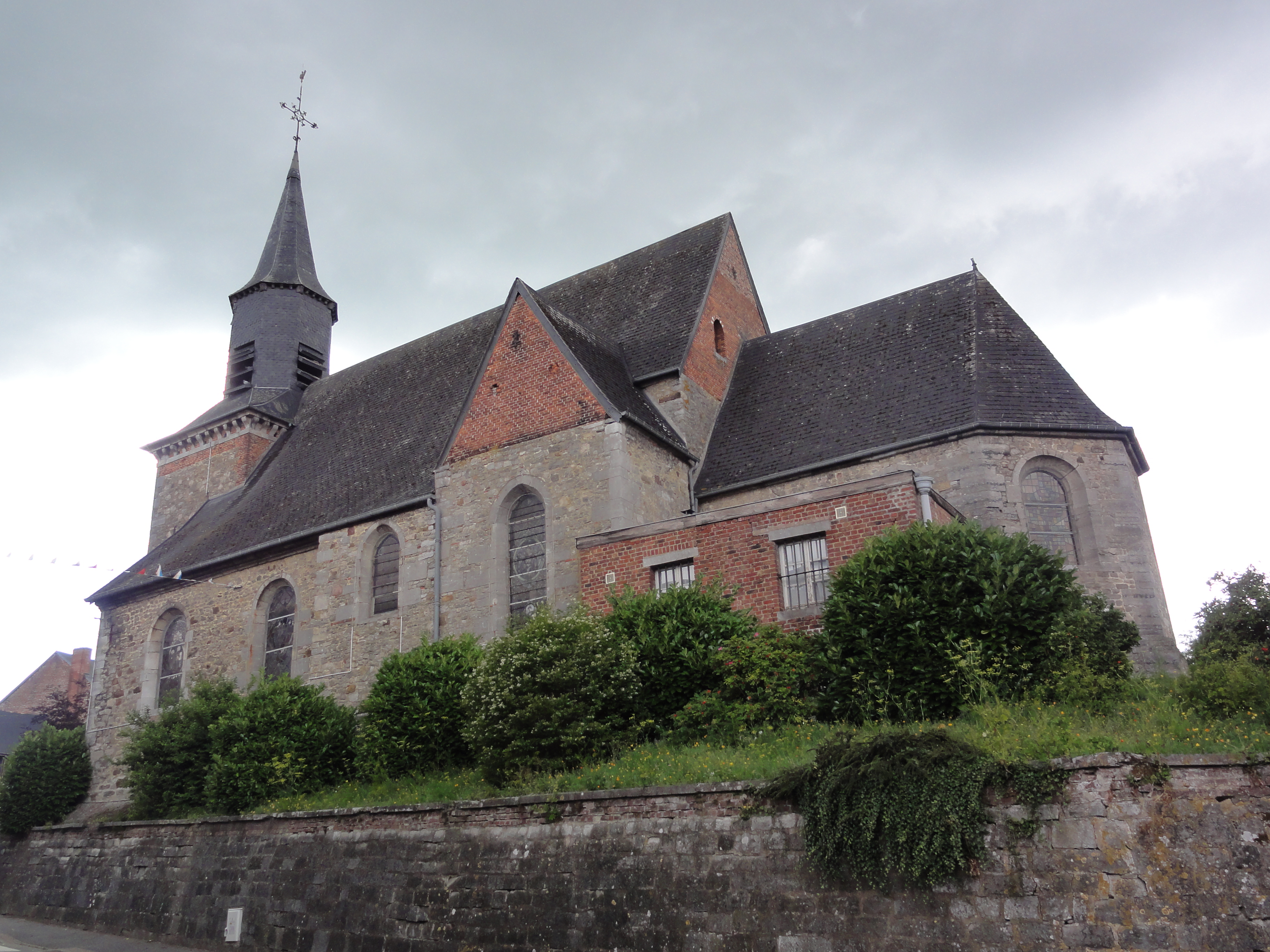
- The church in Sains-du-Nord

- Coat of arms
- Location of Sains-du-Nord
- Location within France Location within Hauts-de-France
- Coordinates: 50°05′40″N 4°00′39″E
- Country: France
- Region: Hauts-de-France
- Department: Nord
- Arrondissement: Avesnes-sur-Helpe
- Canton: Fourmies
- Intercommunality: Cœur de l'Avesnois

Government
  - Mayor (2020–2026): Christine Basquin
- Area^{1}: 16.03 km^{2} (6.19 sq mi)
- Elevation: 240 m (790 ft)
- Highest elevation: 234 m (768 ft)
- Lowest elevation: 163 m (535 ft)
- Population (2023): 2,755
  - Density: 171.9/km^{2} (445.1/sq mi)
- Time zone: UTC+01:00 (CET)
  - Summer (DST): UTC+02:00 (CEST)
- INSEE/Postal code: 59525 /59177
- ^{1} French Land Register data, which excludes lakes, ponds, glaciers > 1 km^{2} (0.386 sq mi or 247 acres) and river estuaries.

Sains-du-Nord is a commune in the Nord department in northern France.

== Population ==
Historical population
Year	Pop.	±% p.a.
1968	3,545	—
1975	3,424	−0.49%
1982	3,373	−0.21%
1990	3,219	−0.58%
1999	3,148	−0.25%
2007	3,058	−0.36%
2012	2,981	−0.51%
2017	2,892	−0.60%
2023	2,755	−0.81%
Source: INSEE

== Heraldry ==
Arms of Sains-du-Nord	The arms of Sains-du-Nord are blazoned : Argent, a boar's head erased sable, armed argent langued gules. (Liessies, Sains-du-Nord and Sémeries use the same arms.)

== See also ==
- Communes of the Nord department
