= Liessies =

- Commune
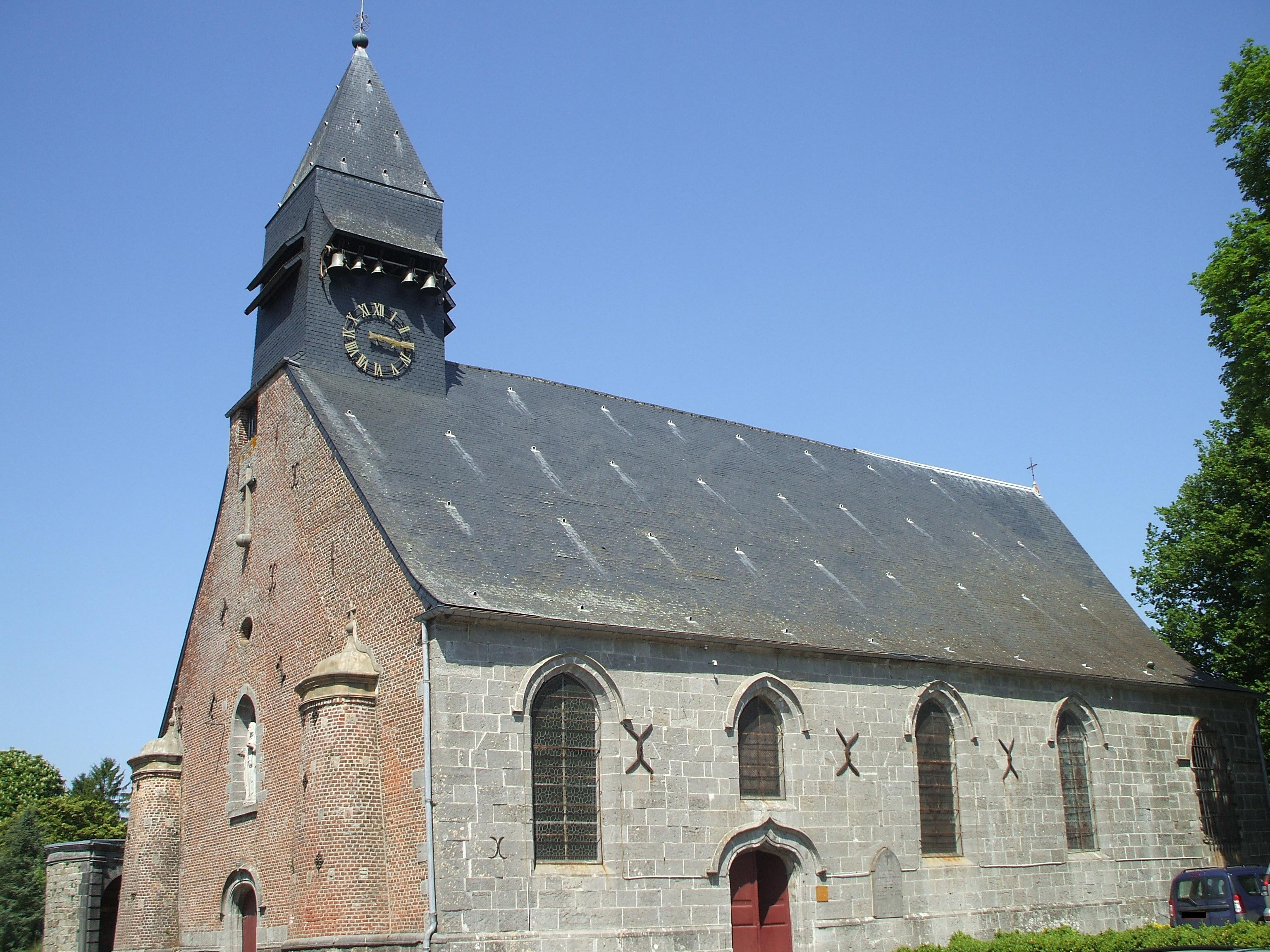
- The church in Liessies

- Coat of arms
- Location of Liessies
- Location within France Location within Hauts-de-France
- Coordinates: 50°07′07″N 4°04′58″E
- Country: France
- Region: Hauts-de-France
- Department: Nord
- Arrondissement: Avesnes-sur-Helpe
- Canton: Fourmies
- Intercommunality: CC Cœur de l'Avesnois

Government
  - Mayor (2020–2026): Alain Richard
- Area^{1}: 17.6 km^{2} (6.8 sq mi)
- Elevation: 182 m (597 ft)
- Highest elevation: 234 m (768 ft)
- Lowest elevation: 157 m (515 ft)
- Population (2023): 527
  - Density: 29.9/km^{2} (77.6/sq mi)
- Time zone: UTC+01:00 (CET)
  - Summer (DST): UTC+02:00 (CEST)
- INSEE/Postal code: 59347 /59740
- ^{1} French Land Register data, which excludes lakes, ponds, glaciers > 1 km^{2} (0.386 sq mi or 247 acres) and river estuaries.

Liessies (French pronunciation: [ljɛsi]) is a commune in the Nord department in northern France.

It is known for Liessies Abbey, of which the abbey church and the park have been preserved.

== Heraldry ==
Arms of Liessies	The arms of Liessies are blazoned : Argent, a boar's head erased sable, armed argent langued gules. (Liessies, Sains-du-Nord and Sémeries use the same arms.)

== See also ==
- Communes of the Nord department
