= Villereau, Nord =

Villereau
- Commune
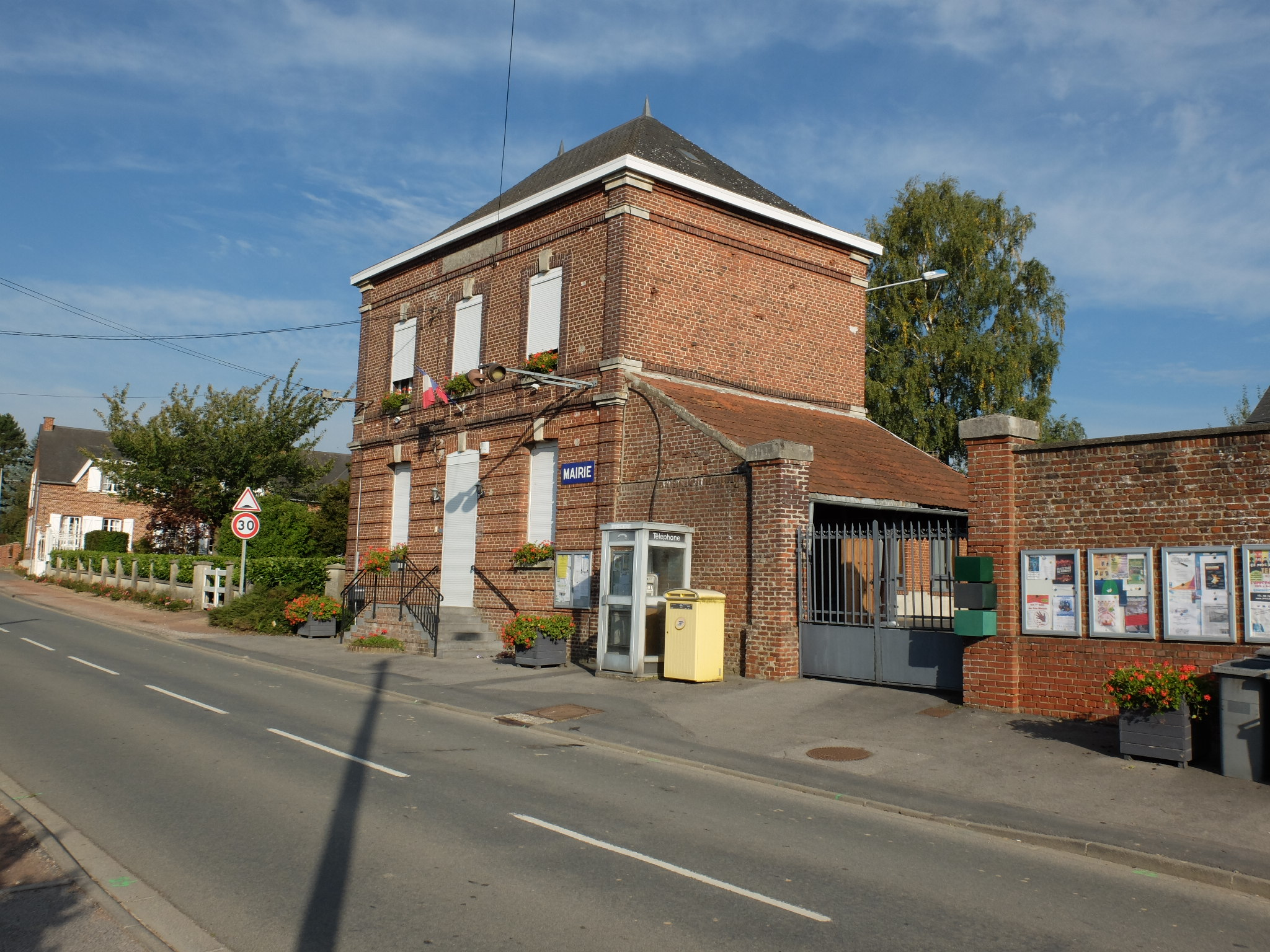
- The town hall in Villereau

- Coat of arms
- Location of Villereau
- Location within France Location within Hauts-de-France
- Coordinates: 50°14′47″N 3°41′51″E
- Country: France
- Region: Hauts-de-France
- Department: Nord
- Arrondissement: Avesnes-sur-Helpe
- Canton: Aulnoye-Aymeries
- Intercommunality: Pays de Mormal

Government
  - Mayor (2020–2026): André Fréhaut
- Area^{1}: 5.52 km^{2} (2.13 sq mi)
- Elevation: 135 m (443 ft)
- Highest elevation: 149 m (489 ft)
- Lowest elevation: 93 m (305 ft)
- Population (2023): 1,084
  - Density: 196/km^{2} (509/sq mi)
- Time zone: UTC+01:00 (CET)
  - Summer (DST): UTC+02:00 (CEST)
- INSEE/Postal code: 59619 /59530
- ^{1} French Land Register data, which excludes lakes, ponds, glaciers > 1 km^{2} (0.386 sq mi or 247 acres) and river estuaries.

Villereau (French pronunciation: [vilʁo]) is a commune in the Nord department in northern France.

== Heraldry ==
Arms of Villereau	The arms of Villereau are blazoned : Or, 3 fesses gules. (Saint-Hilaire-lez-Cambrai, Villereau and Wallers, Rambures use the same arms.)

== See also ==
- Communes of the Nord department
