= Saint-Hilaire-lez-Cambrai =

- Commune
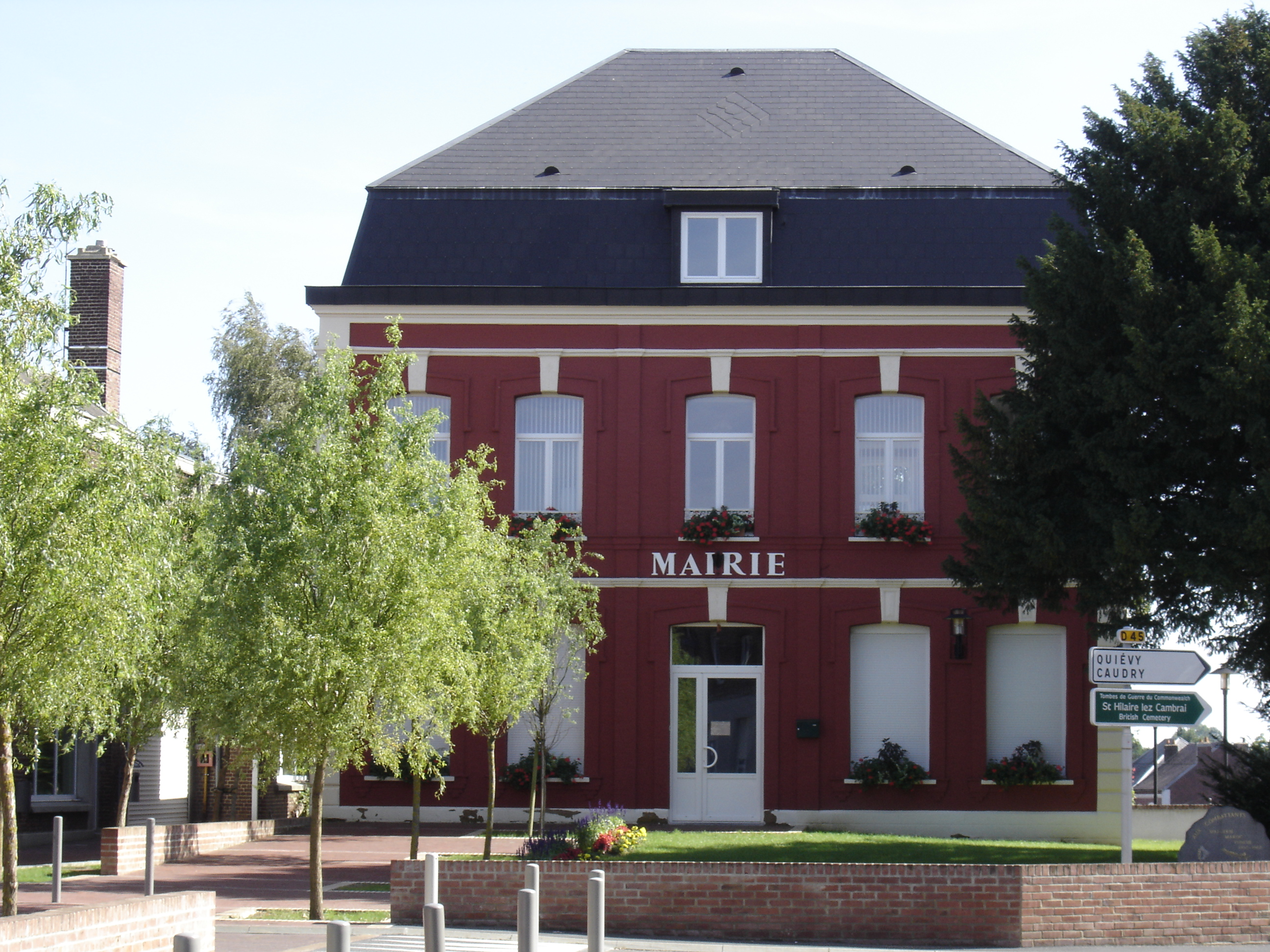
- The town hall in Saint-Hilaire-lez-Cambrai

- Coat of arms
- Location of Saint-Hilaire-lez-Cambrai
- Location within France Location within Hauts-de-France
- Coordinates: 50°11′03″N 3°24′49″E
- Country: France
- Region: Hauts-de-France
- Department: Nord
- Arrondissement: Cambrai
- Canton: Caudry
- Intercommunality: CA Caudrésis–Catésis

Government
  - Mayor (2020–2026): Maurice Defaux
- Area^{1}: 6.41 km^{2} (2.47 sq mi)
- Elevation: 97 m (318 ft)
- Highest elevation: 107 m (351 ft)
- Lowest elevation: 71 m (233 ft)
- Population (2023): 1,558
  - Density: 243/km^{2} (630/sq mi)
- Time zone: UTC+01:00 (CET)
  - Summer (DST): UTC+02:00 (CEST)
- INSEE/Postal code: 59533 /59292
- ^{1} French Land Register data, which excludes lakes, ponds, glaciers > 1 km^{2} (0.386 sq mi or 247 acres) and river estuaries.

Saint-Hilaire-lez-Cambrai (French pronunciation: [sɛ̃.t‿ilɛʁ lɛ kɑ̃bʁɛ], literally Saint-Hilaire near Cambrai) is a commune in the Nord department in northern France.

== Heraldry ==
Arms of Saint-Hilaire-lez-Cambrai	The arms of Saint-Hilaire-lez-Cambrai are blazoned : Or, 3 fesses gules. (Saint-Hilaire-lez-Cambrai, Villereau and Wallers, Rambures use the same arms.)

== French sartorial heritage ==
The city was a pivotal center of mulquinerie

== See also ==
- Communes of the Nord department
