= Sepmeries =

- Commune
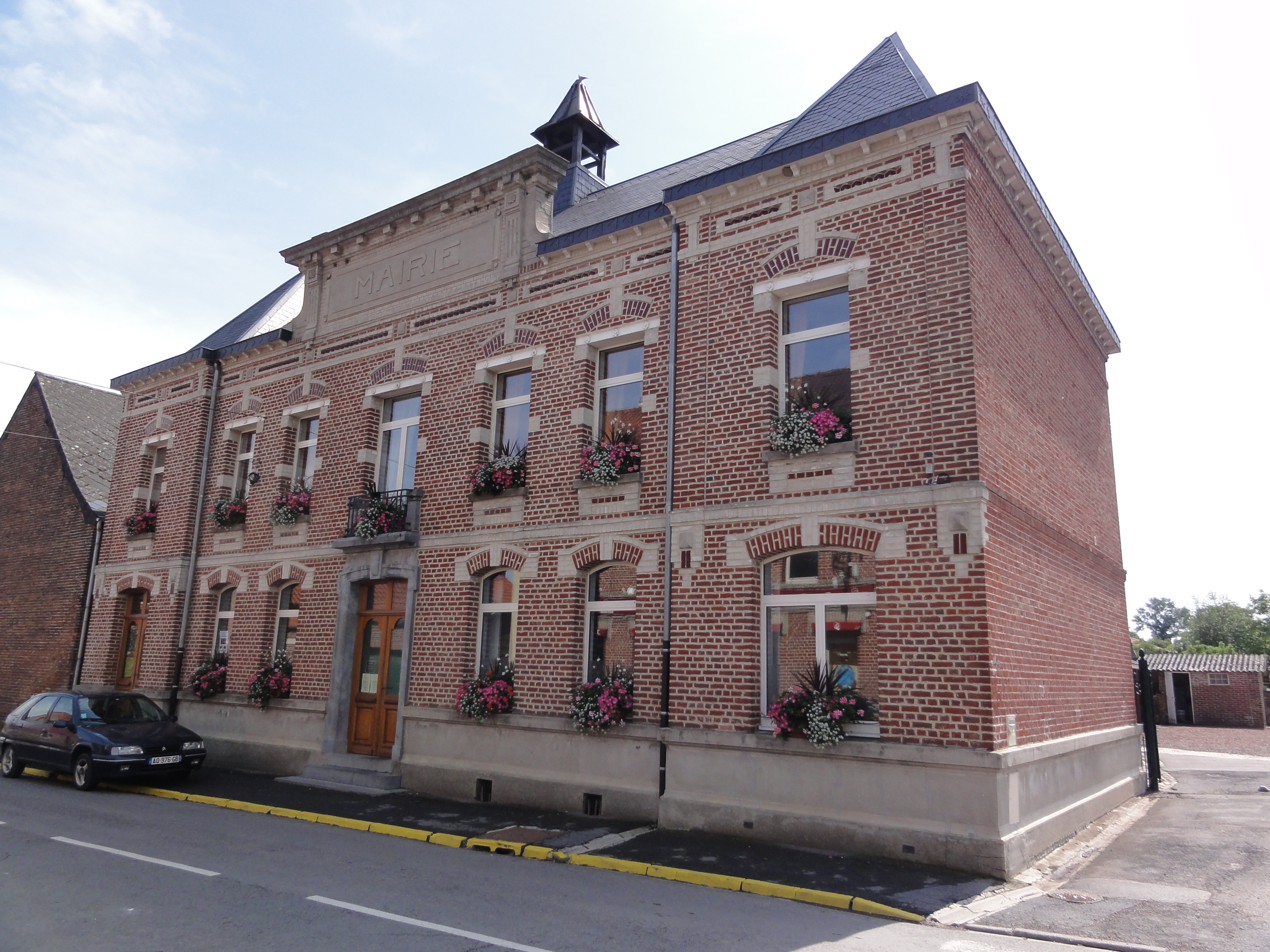
- The town hall in Sepmeries

- Coat of arms
- Location of Sepmeries
- Location within France Location within Hauts-de-France
- Coordinates: 50°17′01″N 3°33′53″E
- Country: France
- Region: Hauts-de-France
- Department: Nord
- Arrondissement: Avesnes-sur-Helpe
- Canton: Avesnes-sur-Helpe
- Intercommunality: CC Pays de Mormal

Government
  - Mayor (2020–2026): Thierry Soszynski
- Area^{1}: 5.99 km^{2} (2.31 sq mi)
- Elevation: 76 m (249 ft)
- Highest elevation: 106 m (348 ft)
- Lowest elevation: 53 m (174 ft)
- Population (2023): 640
  - Density: 110/km^{2} (280/sq mi)
- Time zone: UTC+01:00 (CET)
  - Summer (DST): UTC+02:00 (CEST)
- INSEE/Postal code: 59565 /59269
- ^{1} French Land Register data, which excludes lakes, ponds, glaciers > 1 km^{2} (0.386 sq mi or 247 acres) and river estuaries.

Sepmeries is a commune in the Nord department in northern France.

== History ==
During World War I, intense action took place close to Sepmeries, including a dramatic incident described by A. S. Bullock in his posthumously published memoir, in which he narrowly escaped death by making a dash out of a practice trench where he and his comrades were trapped under bombardment.

== Heraldry ==
Arms of Sepmeries	The arms of Sepmeries are blazoned : Azure, a cross moline between 4 mullets of 6 points argent. (Rombies-et-Marchipont and Sepmeries use the same arms.)

== See also ==
- Communes of the Nord department
