= Sémeries =

- Commune
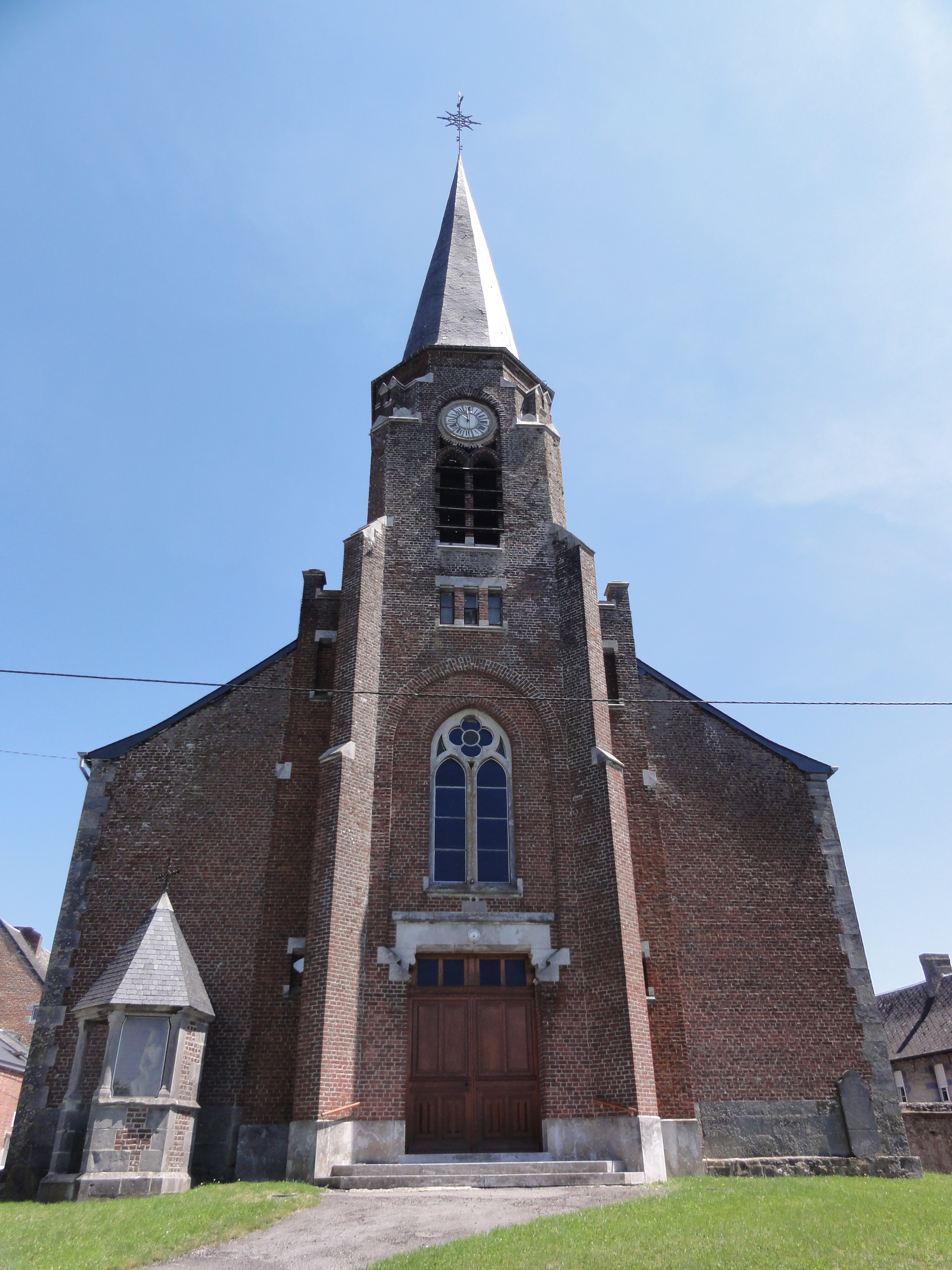
- The church in Sémeries

- Coat of arms
- Location of Sémeries
- Location within France Location within Hauts-de-France
- Coordinates: 50°07′13″N 4°00′03″E
- Country: France
- Region: Hauts-de-France
- Department: Nord
- Arrondissement: Avesnes-sur-Helpe
- Canton: Fourmies
- Intercommunality: CC Cœur de l'Avesnois

Government
  - Mayor (2020–2026): Hervé Laspalas
- Area^{1}: 13.46 km^{2} (5.20 sq mi)
- Elevation: 206 m (676 ft)
- Highest elevation: 222 m (728 ft)
- Lowest elevation: 148 m (486 ft)
- Population (2023): 520
  - Density: 39/km^{2} (100/sq mi)
- Time zone: UTC+01:00 (CET)
  - Summer (DST): UTC+02:00 (CEST)
- INSEE/Postal code: 59562 /59440
- ^{1} French Land Register data, which excludes lakes, ponds, glaciers > 1 km^{2} (0.386 sq mi or 247 acres) and river estuaries.

Sémeries (French pronunciation: [semʁi]) is a commune in the Nord department in northern France.

Sémeries sits in the valley of the Helpe Majeure in the Avesnois Regional Park in an area called the little Switzerland of the North.

== History ==
The rights of the village were given in 1095 by Thierry d'Avesnes to Abbey Liessies who retained it until the French Revolution.

== Heraldry ==
| Arms of Sémeries | The arms of Sémeries are blazoned : Argent, a boar's head erased sable, armed argent langued gules. (Liessies, Sains-du-Nord and Sémeries use the same arms.) |

== See also ==
- Communes of the Nord department
