= Beaufort-Blavincourt =

- Commune
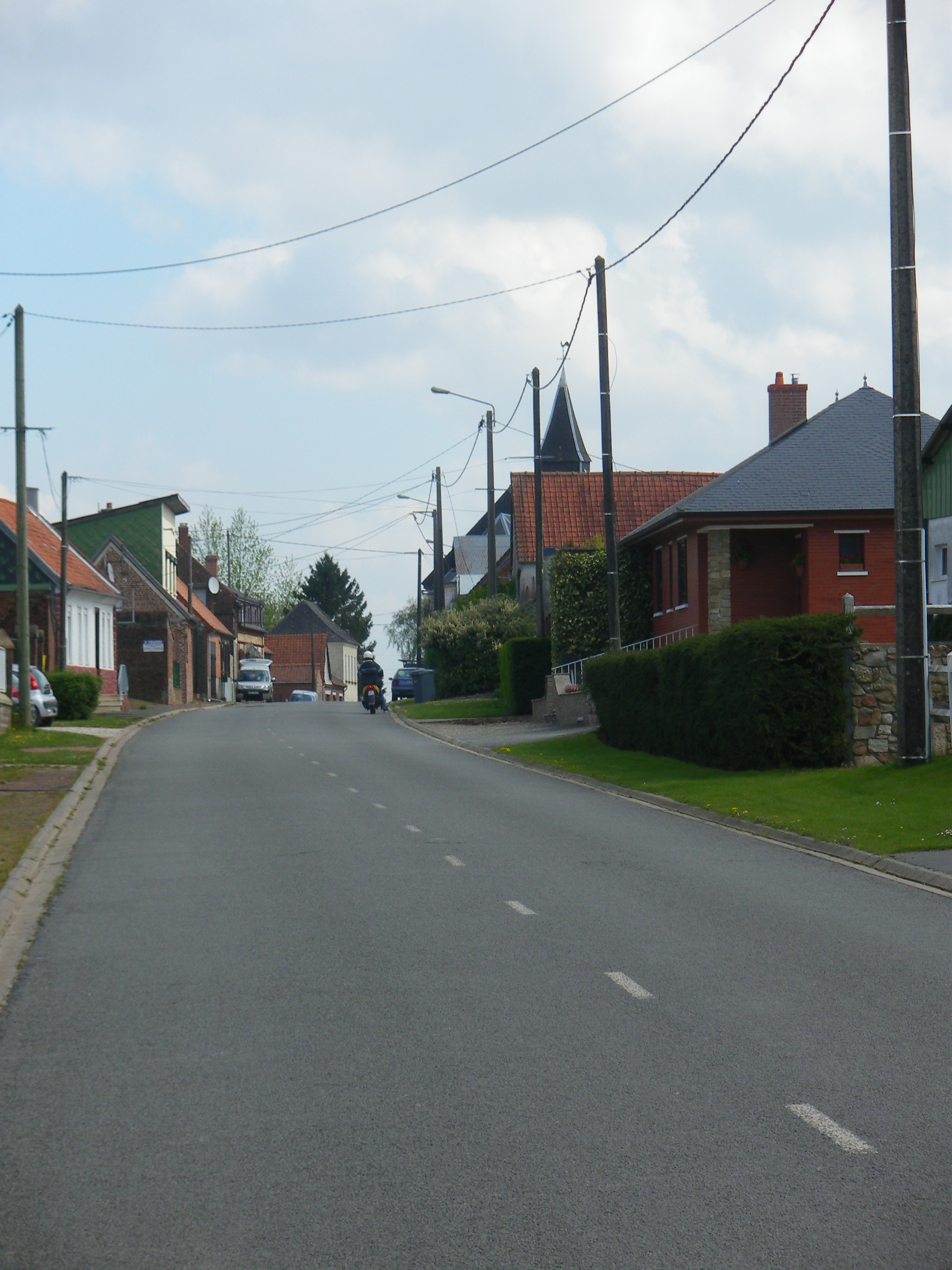
- The main road of Beaufort-Blavincourt

- Coat of arms
- Location of Beaufort-Blavincourt
- Location within France Location within Hauts-de-France
- Coordinates: 50°16′48″N 2°29′57″E
- Country: France
- Region: Hauts-de-France
- Department: Pas-de-Calais
- Arrondissement: Arras
- Canton: Avesnes-le-Comte
- Intercommunality: CC Campagnes de l'Artois

Government
  - Mayor (2020–2026): André Michel
- Area^{1}: 7.98 km^{2} (3.08 sq mi)
- Elevation: 152 m (499 ft)
- Highest elevation: 158 m (518 ft)
- Lowest elevation: 118 m (387 ft)
- Population (2023): 403
  - Density: 50.5/km^{2} (131/sq mi)
- Time zone: UTC+01:00 (CET)
  - Summer (DST): UTC+02:00 (CEST)
- INSEE/Postal code: 62092 /62810
- ^{1} French Land Register data, which excludes lakes, ponds, glaciers > 1 km^{2} (0.386 sq mi or 247 acres) and river estuaries.

Beaufort-Blavincourt (French pronunciation: [bofɔʁ blavɛ̃kuʁ]; Picard: Biaufort-Blavincourt) is a commune in the Pas-de-Calais department in the Hauts-de-France region in northern France.

== Geography ==
A farming village located 13 miles (21 km) west of Arras on the D78 road.

== Population ==
Historical population
Year	Pop.	±% p.a.
1968	319	—
1975	300	−0.87%
1982	355	+2.43%
1990	394	+1.31%
1999	386	−0.23%
2007	430	+1.36%
2012	429	−0.05%
2017	397	−1.54%
2023	403	+0.25%
Source: INSEE

== Sights ==
- The church of the Holy Trinity at Beaufort, dating from the nineteenth century.
- The church of St. Pierre at Blavincourt, dating from the sixteenth century.
- Vestiges of a castle and a feudal motte.

== See also ==
- Communes of the Pas-de-Calais department
