= Armorial of the Communes of Nord (D–H) =

This page lists the armoury emblazons, heraldic descriptions, or coats of arms of the communes in Nord (D-H)

== Complete lists of Nord armorial pages ==
- Armorial of the Communes of Nord (A–C)
- Armorial of the Communes of Nord (D–H)
- Armorial of the Communes of Nord (I–P)
- Armorial of the Communes of Nord (Q–Z)

== D ==
Image	Name of Commune	French blazon	English blazon
	Damousies	Bandé d'or et de gueules	Bendy Or and gules. (Avesnes-sur-Helpe, Cartignies, Damousies, Dimechaux, Dimont, Felleries, Larouillies, Lomme, and Ramousies use the same arms.)
	Dechy	Parti: au 1, d'or à une demi-aigle de sable mouvante du parti; au 2, d'azur semé de fleurs de lis d'or.	Or, an eagle sable dimidiated with Azure semy de lys Or. The latter being France Ancient (Dechy, Férin and Saint-Saulve use the same arms.)
	Dehéries	De gueules à une étoile à cinq rais d'argent.	Gules a mullet of five points argent.
	Denain	D'or à la croix engrêlée de gueules, au lambel d'argent à six pendants brochant.	
	Deûlémont	Ecartelé: aux 1 et 4, de gueules à une fleur de lis d'argent; aux 2 et 3, d'or, au lion de sable, lampassé de gueules; sur le tout un écusson d'or au créquier de gueules brochant sur une crosse d'or mise en pal.	Quarterly 1 and 4: Gules, a fleur de lys argent; 2 and 3: Or a lion sable langued gules overall a crozier thereon an inescutcheon or charged with a créquier gules.
	Dimechaux	Bandé d'or et de gueules.	Bendy Or and gules. (Avesnes-sur-Helpe, Cartignies, Damousies, Dimechaux, Dimont, Felleries, Larouillies, Lomme, and Ramousies use the same arms.)
	Dimont	Bandé d'or et de gueules	Bendy Or and gules. (Avesnes-sur-Helpe, Cartignies, Damousies, Dimechaux, Dimont, Felleries, Larouillies, Lomme, and Ramousies use the same arms.)
	Doignies	D'azur à un écusson d'or en abîme au chef cousu de gueules chargé de trois fermeaux d'or rangés en fasce.	Azure an inescutcheon or and on a chief gules three buckles or.
	Dompierre-sur-Helpe	D'azur au chevron d'argent, accompagné de trois aigles d'or languées et onglées de gueules.	Azure, a chevron argent between 3 eagles Or langued and armed gules. (Dompierre-sur-Helpe and Écuélin use the same arms.)
	Don	Pas de blason connu à ce jour.	No known arms. This entry is only for the sake of completeness.
	Douai	De gueules plain, enregistré à l'Armorial de France en 1697. On trouve deux variantes: de gueules au «d» gothique d'or, qui était en usage aux XVIe et XVIIe siècles. de gueules percé en cœur par une flèche d'or lancée d'en haut à dextre, faisant jaillir un flot de sang au naturel, d'où découlent six gouttes de sang aussi au naturel, inventé vers 1730 et tout-à-fait fautif selon les règles de base de l'héralqique.	Gules simple.
	Douchy-les-Mines	Burelé d'argent et d'azur de dix pièces, à deux bars adossés d'or brochant sur le tout.	Barry argent and azure two sea-bass addorsed or.
	Le Doulieu	De gueules au sautoir de vair.	Gules, a saltire vair. (Le Doulieu and Eecke use the same arms.)
	Dourlers	D'azur au lion d'or tenant en ses pattes une clef d'argent, le panneton en haut et à dextre.	Azure, a lion Or maintaining a key argent. (Dourlers, Pont-sur-Sambre and Rainsars use the same arms.)
	Drincham	Echiqueté d'argent et d'azur, à la bordure de gueules.	Chequy argent and azure, a bordure gules.
	Dunkerque	Coupé: au premier d'or au lion léopardé de sable armé et lampassé de gueules, au second d'argent au dauphin couché d'azur crété, barbé, loré, pautré et oreillé de gueules. Selon la tradition, avant 1696: Coupé: au premier, d'or au lion de sable, armé et lampassé de gueules; au second, d'argent au bar pâmé.	Per fess Or and argent, a lion passant sable armed and langued gules, and a dolphin naiant azure crested, barbed, finned and tailed gules.

== E ==
Image	Name of Commune	French blazon	English blazon
	Ebblinghem	D'argent à une fasce d'azur, accompagnée de sept mouchetures d'hermines, quatre en chef et trois en pointe.	Argent a fess azure between seven ermine spots sable 4 and 3.
	Écaillon	D'argent à la croix engrêlée de gueules.	Argent, a cross engrailed gules. (Bruille-lez-Marchiennes and Écaillon use the same arms.)
	Eccles	D'argent à trois lions de gueules, armés, lampassés et couronnés d'or.	Argent, 3 lions gules, armed, langued and crowned Or. (Eccles, Nord and Villers-Sire-Nicole use the same arms.)
	Éclaibes	De gueules à trois lions d'argent couronnés d'or.	Gules, 3 lions argent crowned Or. (Avesnes-les-Aubert, Éclaibes and Inchy use the same arms.)
	Écuélin	D'azur au chevron d'argent, accompagné de trois aigles d'or languées et onglées de gueules.	Azure, a chevron argent between 3 eagles Or langued and armed gules. (Dompierre-sur-Helpe and Écuélin use the same arms.)
	Eecke	De gueules au sautoir de vair.	Gules, a saltire vair. (Le Doulieu and Eecke use the same arms.)
	Élesmes	D'argent à la bande d'azur.	Argent a bend azure.
	Élincourt	De gueules au franc-quartier d'hermines.	Gules a canton ermine.
	Émerchicourt	D'argent à une truie de sable passant sur une terrasse de sinople.	Argent, a sow passant sable on a base vert. (Curgies and Émerchicourt use the same arms.)
	Emmerin	De gueules au lion d'or, armé, lampassé et couronné d'azur.	Gules, a lion Or, armed, langued and crowned azure. (Aix-en-Pévèle, Emmerin, and Haubourdin use the same arms.)
	Englefontaine	De vair à trois pals de gueules.	Vair, 3 pales gules. (Englefontaine, Louvignies-Quesnoy, Poix-du-Nord and Saint-Waast-la-Vallée use the same arms.)
	Englos	De sable à l'écu d'argent.	Sable an inescutcheon argent.
	Ennetières-en-Weppes	De sable au chef d'argent.	Sable, a chief argent. (Ennetières-en-Weppes, Houplines and Sailly-lez-Lannoy use the same arms.)
	Ennevelin	Fascé contrefascé d'or et d'azur de quatre pièces.	Per pale and barry or and azure.
	Eppe-Sauvage	D'or à quatre pals de gueules, à la bordure engrêlée d'azur.	Or, 4 pales gules within a bordure engrailed azure. (Eppe-Sauvage, Ohain and Wallers-en-Fagne use the same arms.)
	Erchin	D'argent à trois chevrons de sable.	Argent, 3 chevrons sable. (Erchin and Guesnain use the same arms.)
	Eringhem	Gironné d'or et d'azur de dix pièces, à l'écusson de gueules brochant en abîme sur le tout.	Gyronny of 10 Or and azure, an inescutcheon gules. (Eringhem and Faumont use the same arms.)
	Erquinghem-le-Sec	D'or à cinq cotices de gueules, au canton dextre du même.	Or five bendlets and a canton gules.
	Erquinghem-Lys	D'or au lion de sable, à la bande componée d'argent et de gueules brochant sur le tout.	Or a lion sable overall a bend componey argent and gules.
	Erre	D'or à une escarboucle de sable chargée en cœur d'un rubis de gueules.	Or, on an escarbuncle sable a ruby gules. (Abscon, Beuvry-la-Forêt, Erre, Fenain, Marchiennes, Ronchin, Tilloy-lez-Marchiennes and Wandignies-Hamage use the same arms.)
	Escarmain	D'or au lion de gueules.	Or, a lion gules. (Pont-l'Abbé, Escarmain and Haussy (see also Râches) use the same arms.)
	Escaudain	D'azur semé de fleurs de lys d'or.	Azure, semy de lys Or. = France Ancient (Ansacq, Brillon, Escaudain, Escautpont, Hélesmes, Hérin, Lecelles, Lieu-Saint-Amand, Lourches, Neuville-sur-Escaut, Rosult, Rumegies and Wignehies use the same arms.)
	Escaudœuvres	anciennement: d'hermine au chef de gueules depuis 1980: de sinople à trois fasces d'hermine	Ermine a chief gules. depuis 1980: Vert three fesses ermine.
	Escaufourt (former commune)	De gueules, à 3 chevrons d'or, au lambel de 4 pendants du même.	Gules three chevrons in chief a label of four points or.
	Escautpont	D'azur semé de fleurs de lys d'or.	Azure, semy de lys Or. = France Ancient (Ansacq, Brillon, Escaudain, Escautpont, Hélesmes, Hérin, Lecelles, Lieu-Saint-Amand, Lourches, Neuville-sur-Escaut, Rosult, Rumegies and Wignehies use the same arms.)
	Escobecques	De sinople à trois trèfles d'or.	Vert three trefoils or.
	Esnes	De sable aux dix losanges accolées et aboutées d'argent, ordonnées 3,3,3, et 1	Sable, 10 lozenges conjoined argent 3,3,3 and 1. (Esnes and Forenville use the same arms.)
	Esquelbecq	D'or au chevron d'azur à trois étoiles de gueules. devise: "vaincre ou mourir." Il serait souvent repris par erreur sous le blason des Ghistelles d'Esquelbecq: De gueules au chevron d'hermines, accompagné de trois molettes à six rais d'argent.	Or a chevron azure between three mullets of five gules.
	Esquerchin	Bandé de gueules et de vair, et une cotice de sable brochant en barre sur le tout.	Bendy gules and vair a bendlet sinister sable.
	Esquermes Former commune merged with Lille in 1858.	De gueules, au nom d'Esquermes d'or, mis en bande entre deux cotices du même, et accompagné en chef à senestre d'un écu d'or au lion de sable.	Gules the name Esquermes bendwise between two bendlets or and to sinister on an inescutcheon or a lion sable.
	Estaires	Coupé d'argent sur gueules, à une croix ancrée de l'un en l'autre.	Per fess argent and gules a cross moline counterchanged.
	Estourmel	De gueules à la croix dentelée d'argent.	Gules, a cross indented argent. (Estourmel and Steenwerck use the same arms.)
	Estrées	De sinople à la fasce d'hermines.	Vert, a fess ermine. (Oignies, Beaucamps-Ligny, Estrées, Gruson and Wicres use the same arms.)
	Estreux	D'azur à trois fleurs de lys d'or.	Azure, 3 fleurs de lys Or. (France and the communes of Estreux, Obrechies use the same arms.)
	Estrun	D'or à trois lions d'azur, au chef de gueules chargé d'une Notre-Dame-de-Grâce de carnation à mi-corps, tenant à senestre l'Enfant Jésus, et vêtue de gueules et d'azur.	Or, 3 lions azure, on a chief gules, a demi-'Notre-Dame-de-Grâce de carnation' issuant from the line of division, vested gules and azure and holding in her left arm the Baby Jesus. (Boursies, Cattenières, Carnières, Estrun, Maresches, Onnaing, Ors, Orsinval, Thun-l'Évêque and originally, Notre-Dame de Cambrai, use the same arms.)
	Eswars	De gueules à la bande d'or, chargée en chef d'un lion d'azur, armé et lampassé de gueules.	Gules, a bend Or charged in chief with a lion azure, armed and langued gules.
	Eth	D'or à la croix engrêlée de gueules.	Or, a cross engrailed gules. (Artres, Bettrechies, Cerfontaine, Denain, Eth, Lesquin, Obies, Quérénaing, Semousies, Wambrechies and Warlaing use the same arms.)
	Étrœungt	Écartelé: aux 1 et 4, d'argent à trois fasces de gueules; aux 2 et 3, d'argent à trois doloires de gueules, les deux du chef adossées.	Quarterly 1&4: Argent, 3 fesses gules; 2&3: Argent, 3 wagoner's axes top 2 addorsed gules. (Bermerain, Étrœungt, Féron, Ferrière-la-Grande, Lez-Fontaine, Rousies, Solre-le-Château and Solrinnes use the same arms.)

== F ==
Image	Name of Commune	French blazon	English blazon
	Faches-Thumesnil	Écartelé: au 1 et 4, de sable semé de besants d'or, au lion du même, armé et lampassé de gueules brochant sur le tout (Faches), au 2 et 3, d'azur à un écusson d'argent, avec en chef trois étoiles or.(Thumesnil)	Quarterly 1 and 4: Sable bezanty, a lion Or, armed and langued gules (Faches); 2 and 3 Azure an inescutcheon argent and in chief three mullets of five or (Thumesnil).
	Famars	De sable semé de billettes d'or, au lion du même, armé, lampassé et couronné d'argent, brochant sur le tout.	Sable billetty, a lion Or, armed, langued and crowned argent.
	Faumont	Gironné d'or et d'azur de dix pièces et un écusson de gueules brochant en abîme sur le tout.	Gyronny of 10 Or and azure, an inescutcheon gules. (Eringhem and Faumont use the same arms.)
	Le Favril	De gueules à trois pals de vair, au chef d'or.	Gules, 3 pales vair, and a chief Or. (Beugnies and Le Favril use the same arms.)
	Féchain	De sable à la bande d'or.	Sable, a bend Or. (Cuincy and Féchain use the same arms.)
	Feignies	D'or au lion de sable, armé et lampassé de gueules.	Or, a lion sable armed and langued gules. ('Flanders' and the communes of Thourotte, Crépy-en-Valois, Bollezeele, Feignies, Flines-lez-Raches and Wormhout use the same arms.)
	Felleries	Bandé d'or et de gueules.	Bendy Or and gules. (Avesnes-sur-Helpe, Cartignies, Damousies, Dimechaux, Dimont, Felleries, Larouillies, Lomme, and Ramousies use the same arms.)
	Fenain	D'or à une escarboucle de sable, chargée en cœur d'un rubis de gueules.	Or, on an escarbuncle sable a ruby gules. (Abscon, Beuvry-la-Forêt, Erre, Fenain, Marchiennes, Ronchin, Tilloy-lez-Marchiennes and Wandignies-Hamage use the same arms.)
	Férin	Parti: au 1, d'or à une demi-aigle de sable mouvante du parti; au 2, d'azur semé de fleurs de lis d'or.	Or, an eagle sable dimidiated with Azure semy de lys Or. The latter being France Ancient (Dechy, Férin and Saint-Saulve use the same arms.)
	Féron	Écartelé: aux 1 et 4, d'argent à trois fasces de gueules; aux 2 et 3, d'argent à trois doloires de gueules, les deux du chef adossées.	Quarterly 1&4: Argent, 3 fesses gules; 2&3: Argent, 3 wagoner's axes top 2 addorsed gules. (Bermerain, Étrœungt, Féron, Ferrière-la-Grande, Lez-Fontaine, Rousies, Solre-le-Château and Solrinnes use the same arms.)
	Ferrière-la-Grande	Écartelé: aux 1 et 4, d'argent à trois fasces de gueules; aux 2 et 3, d'argent à trois doloires de gueules, les deux du chef adossées.	Quarterly 1&4: Argent, 3 fesses gules; 2&3: Argent, 3 wagoner's axes top 2 addorsed gules. (Bermerain, Étrœungt, Féron, Ferrière-la-Grande, Lez-Fontaine, Rousies, Solre-le-Château and Solrinnes use the same arms.)
	Ferrière-la-Petite	De gueules à la fasce d'argent, chargée de trois brêmes au naturel.	Gules on a fess argent three breams proper.
	Fives; Merged into Lille in 1858.	D'azur semé de fleurs de lis d'or, et un buste de saint Nicaise au naturel, mitré d'argent, brochant sur le tout. Remarque: Fives a été rattachée à Lille en 1858	Azure semy de lys or, the bust of saint Nicaise proper mitred argent.
	La Flamengrie	Bandé d'argent et de gueules.	Bendy argent and gules. (La Flamengrie, Fournes-en-Weppes and Wargnies-le-Grand use the same arms.)
	Flaumont-Waudrechies	D'or à trois chevrons de sable.	Or, 3 chevrons sable. (Bersillies, Boeschepe, Boussières-sur-Sambre, Colleret, Cousolre, Flaumont-Waudrechies, Hautmont, Limont-Fontaine, Lompret, Masny, Neuville-en-Avesnois and Saint-Rémy-du-Nord use the same arms.)
	Flers-en-Escrebieux	D'argent au chevron de gueules, accompagné d'un annelet du même en pointe.	Argent a chevron (gules?) and in base an annulet gules.
	Flers-lez-Lille; Merged in 1970 with Villeneuve-d'Ascq.	De gueules, au chef échiqueté d'argent et d'azur de trois tirés.	Gules a chief chequy argent and azure.
	Flesquières	D'or à la bande de sable.	Or, a bend sable. (Flesquières, Gonnelieu, Mons-en-Barœul and Viesly use the same arms.)
	Flêtre	D'argent à trois fleurs de lys au pied nourri de gueules.	Argent three demi-fleurs de lys gules.
	Flines-lès-Mortagne	D'or à la croix de gueules.	Or, a cross gules. (Bruille-Saint-Amand, Flines-lès-Mortagne, Mortagne-du-Nord and Nivelle use the same arms.)
	Flines-lez-Raches	D'or au lion de sable, armé et lampassé de gueules.	Or, a lion sable armed and langued gules. ('Flanders' and the communes of Thourotte, Crépy-en-Valois, Bollezeele, Feignies, Flines-lez-Raches and Wormhout use the same arms.)
	Floursies	D'azur à trois clefs d'or mises en pal, les pannetons en haut et à dextre.	Azure, 3 keys Or. (Floursies, Hargnies and Raismes use the same arms.)
	Floyon	Fascé de vair et de gueules, les fasces de gueules chargées chacune de trois besants d'argent.	Barry vair and gules bezanty.
	Fontaine-au-Bois	D'azur à la croix d'argent.	Azure, a cross argent. (Bousies and Fontaine-au-Bois use the same arms.)
	Fontaine-au-Pire	D'azur à une étoile à cinq rais d'or, accompagnée en chef d'un lambel à trois pendants du même.	Azure, a mullet, and in chief a label of 3 points Or. (Abancourt and Fontaine-au-Pire use the same arms.)
	Fontaine-Notre-Dame	D'or à une vierge de carnation, tenant à senestre l'Enfant Jésus, vêtue de gueules et d'azur et assise sur un trône de sable.	Or a madonna proper holding a Baby Jesus in her left arm, vested gules and azure, seated on a throne sable.
	Forenville; Merged in 1964 with Séranvillers to create Séranvillers-Forenville.	De sable à dix losanges accolées et aboutées d'argent, 3, 3, 3, et 1. Commune ayant fusionné en 1964 avec celle de Séranvillers pour former Séranvillers-Forenville.	Sable, 10 lozenges conjoined argent 3,3,3 and 1. (Esnes and Forenville use the same arms.)
	Forest-en-Cambrésis	D'argent à trois croissants de sable.	Argent three crescents sable.
	Forest-sur-Marque	De gueules au chef d'argent.	Gules a chief argent.
	Fort-Mardyck	Champs de gueules à la licorne saillante d'argent, auchef d'azur chargé d'un soleil à face humaine, rayonnant d'or, enfermé dans une bordure bretessée aussi d'or.	Gules a unicorn saliant argent on a chief a sun in her splendour all within a bordure or.
	Fourmies	Parti: au 1, coupé d'argent à trois fasces de gueules (qui est de Croÿ) et de gueules plain (qui est d'Albret); au 2, bandé d'or et de gueules (qui est Avesnes).	Gules three fesses argent. (Croÿ); Dimidiated with bendy or and gules. (Avesnes)
	Fournes-en-Weppes	Bandé d'argent et de gueules.	Bendy argent and gules. (La Flamengrie, Fournes-en-Weppes and Wargnies-le-Grand use the same arms.)
	Frasnoy	D'or à trois pals d'azur et une tour d'argent brochant sur le pal du milieu.	Or three pales azure overall a tower argent.
	Frelinghien	D'azur au nom de Frelinghien d'argent, mis en bande entre deux cotices d'or, et accompagné en chef à senestre d'un écu d'or au lion de sable.	Azure the name "Frelinghien" bendwise argent between two bendlets or and in sinister canton on an inescutcheon or a lion sable.
	Fresnes-sur-Escaut	De gueules, au chef d'or.	Gules, a chief Or. (La Neuville, Fresnes-sur-Escaut, Ostricourt, Phalempin and Sainghin-en-Weppes use the same arms.)
	Fressain	De gueules à dix losanges accolées et aboutées d'argent, 3, 3, 3, et 1.	Gules, 10 lozenges conjoined argent 3,3,3 and 1. (Fressain, Hergnies, Lallaing and Marpent use the same arms.)
	Fressies	D'or à la croix engrêlée de sable, au canton de gueules.	Or a cross engrailed sable and a canton gules.
	Fretin	Bandé d'argent et d'azur.	Bendy argent and azure. (Fretin, Saultain and Wannehain use the same arms.)
	Fromelles	D'argent à la croix de gueules.	Argent a cross gules.

== G ==
Image	Name of Commune	French blazon	English blazon
	Genech	D'hermines à la croix de gueules, chargée de cinq quintefeuilles d'or.	Ermine on a cross gules five cinqfoils or.
	Ghissignies	Parti: au 1, d'azur semé de fleurs de lis d'or; au 2, de sinople à la fasce d'argent.	Azure, semy de lys Or dimidiated with Vert, a fess argent. (Ghissignies and Haspres use the same arms.)
	Ghyvelde	D'hermines à une bande de gueules chargée de trois coquilles d'or.	Ermine, on a bend gules, 3 escallops bendwise Or. (Ghyvelde and Hondschoote use the same arms.)
	Glageon	D'hermine à la bande de gueules.	Ermine a bend gules.
	Godewaersvelde	Fascé de gueules et de vair de huit pièces.	Barry gules and vair.
	Gœulzin	De gueules au pairle d'hermines.	Gules a pall ermine.
	Gognies-Chaussée	D'azur à la croix ancrée d'argent.	Azure a cross moline argent.
	Gommegnies	De gueules à une licorne assise d'argent, au chef ondé cousu d'azur chargé de deux clés d'or passées en sautoir adextrées d'un maillet du même et senestrées d'une gerbe de blé d'or liée de gueules.	
	Gondecourt	D'argent à la croix de gueules chargée de cinq coquilles du champ.	Argent on a cross gules five escallops argent.
	Gonnelieu	D'or à la bande de sable.	Or, a bend sable. (Flesquières, Gonnelieu, Mons-en-Barœul and Viesly use the same arms.)
	La Gorgue	D'azur semé de coquilles d'or, au chef d'argent chargé d'un lion issant de sable.	Azure semy of escallops or on a chief argent a demi-lion issuant from the line of division sable.
	Gouzeaucourt	D'azur à l'écusson d'argent en abîme.	Azure an inescutcheon argent.
	Grand-Fayt	D'argent à trois fasces de gueules.	Argent, 3 fesses gules. (Boulogne-sur-Helpe and Petit-Fayt use the same arms.)
	Grand-Fort-Philippe	D'or au lion de sable, à la bordure de gueules; l'écu brochant sur une ancre de sable à la gumène d'argent.	Or a lion sable within a bordure or. (The shield over an anchor sable?)
	Grande-Synthe	D'azur à une fleur de lis d'or, au chef d'argent chargé d'un lion léopardé de sable.	Azure a fleur de lys or and on a chief argent a lion passant sable.
	Gravelines	D'or au lion de sable lampassé de gueules, à la bordure endentée du même.	Or a lion sable langued gules within a bordure of the third.
	La Groise	Taillé: au 1, de gueules au château fort d'argent, ouvert de sable et chargé sur sa porte d'un K du même; au 2, d'azur à un dragon d'or, armé et lampassé de gueules; à une épée d'or à la garde d'argent, chargée d'une croix de gueules gironnée à huit pointes, posée en barre sur le tout.	Per bend sinister gules and azure a sword bendwise sinister or with a guard argent charged with a cross gules between a tower argent pierced and charged with the letter "K" on the door sable and a wyvern or langued gules.
	Gruson	De sinople à la fasce d'hermine.	Vert, a fess ermine. (Oignies, Beaucamps-Ligny, Estrées, Gruson and Wicres use the same arms.)
	Guesnain	D'argent à trois chevrons de sable.	Argent, 3 chevrons sable. (Erchin and Guesnain use the same arms.)
	Gussignies	D'or à trois aigles à deux têtes de gueules.	Or, 3 double-headed eagles gules. (Gussignies and Haynecourt use the same arms.)

== H ==
Image	Name of Commune	French blazon	English blazon
	Hallennes-lez-Haubourdin	D'or à cinq cotices de gueules.	Or, 5 bendlets gules. (Hallennes-lez-Haubourdin and Vieux-Berquin use the same arms.)
	Halluin	D'argent à trois lionceaux de sable lampassés de gueles, armés et couronnés d'or.	Argent three lions sable langued gules armed and crowned or.
	Hamel	De sinople au chef d'hermine.	Vert a chief ermine.
	Hantay	D'argent à trois fasces de gueules, à la bordure d'azur.	Argent three fesses gules within a bordure azure.
	Hardifort	D'argent à trois cors de sable liés de gueules, virolés d'or, les embouchures à senestre.	Argent, 3 horns sable tied gules. (Hardifort, Merris and Oudezeele use the same arms.)
	Hargnies	D'azur à trois clefs d'or mises en pal, les pannetons en haut et à dextre.	Azure, 3 keys Or. (Floursies, Hargnies and Raismes use the same arms.)
	Hasnon	Coupé: au premier, d'azur à la bande d'argent accostée de deux épées (d'argent garnie d'or ?) en pal la pointe en bas; au deux, de sable à une clef d'argent en pal, le panneton en haut et à dextre.	Per fess 1: Azure a bend between two swords inverted argent; 2: Sable a key argent.
	Haspres	Parti: au 1, d'azur semé de fleurs de lys d'or; au 2, de sinople à la fasce d'argent.	Azure, semy de lys Or dimidiated with Vert, a fess argent. (Ghissignies and Haspres use the same arms.)
	Haubourdin	De gueules, au lion d'or, armé, lampassé et couronné d'azur.	Gules, a lion Or, armed, langued and crowned azure. (Aix-en-Pévèle, Emmerin, and Haubourdin use the same arms.)
	Haucourt-en-Cambrésis	D'argent semé de billettes de gueules, au lion du même brochant sur le tout.	Argent billetty, a lion gules. (Bazenville, Haucourt-en-Cambrésis, Honnecourt-sur-Escaut and Sailly-lez-Cambrai use the same arms.)
	Haulchin	Parti: au 1, de gueules au lion d'or, armé et lampassé d'azur; au 2, d'azur semé de fleurs de lys d'or.	Gules a lion or impaled with azure semy fleur de lys or.
	Haussy	D'or au lion de gueules.	Or, a lion gules. (Pont-l'Abbé, Escarmain and Haussy (see also Râches) use the same arms.)
	Haut-Lieu	Pas de blason connu à ce jour.	No known arms. This entry is only for the sake of completeness.
	Hautmont	D'or à trois chevrons de sable.	Or, 3 chevrons sable. (Bersillies, Boeschepe, Boussières-sur-Sambre, Colleret, Cousolre, Flaumont-Waudrechies, Hautmont, Limont-Fontaine, Lompret, Masny, Neuville-en-Avesnois and Saint-Rémy-du-Nord use the same arms.)
	Haveluy	D'argent à trois jumelles de gueules.	Argent, 3 bars gemel gules. (Haveluy and Vertain use the same arms.)
	Haverskerque	D'or à la fasce de gueules.	Or, a fess gules. (Condé-sur-l'Escaut and Haverskerque use the same arms.)
	Haynecourt	D'or à trois aigles à deux têtes de gueules.	Or, 3 double-headed eagles gules. (Gussignies and Haynecourt use the same arms.)
	Hazebrouck	D'argent au lion de sable, lampassé de gueules, tenant de ses pattes de devant un écusson d'or chargé d'un lièvre courant en bande au naturel.	Argent a lion sable langued gules holding an inescutcheon or charged with a 'coney courant bendwise proper.
	Hecq	D'azur à trois quintefeuilles d'or.	Azure three cinqfoils or.
	Hélesmes	D'azur semé de fleurs de lys d'or.	Azure, semy de lys Or. = France Ancient (Ansacq, Brillon, Escaudain, Escautpont, Hélesmes, Hérin, Lecelles, Lieu-Saint-Amand, Lourches, Neuville-sur-Escaut, Rosult, Rumegies and Wignehies use the same arms.)
	Hellemmes; Former commune since 1977 associated with Lille.)	De vair.	Vair.
	Hem	D'argent au chef de gueules.	Argent, a chief gules. (Bourghelles and Hem use the same arms.)
	Hem-Lenglet	D'azur à un écusson d'argent en abîme, et une bande engrêlé de gueules brochant en bande sur le tout.	Azure an inescutcheon argent overall a bend engrailed gules.
	Hergnies	De gueules à dix losanges accolées et aboutées d'argent, 3, 3, 3, et 1.	Gules, 10 lozenges conjoined argent 3,3,3 and 1. (Fressain, Hergnies, Lallaing and Marpent use the same arms.)
	Hérin	D'azur semé de fleurs de lys d'or.	Azure, semy de lys Or. = France Ancient (Ansacq, Brillon, Escaudain, Escautpont, Hélesmes, Hérin, Lecelles, Lieu-Saint-Amand, Lourches, Neuville-sur-Escaut, Rosult, Rumegies and Wignehies use the same arms.)
	Herlies	D'azur à trois fleurs de lis d'or, au lambel à trois pendants du même en chef.	Azure three fleurs de lys in chief a label of three points or.
	Herrin	De gueules au chef d'or, fretté de sable.	Gules a chief or fretty sable.
	Herzeele	Coupé: en chef, d'or à l'aigle éployée de sable; en pointe, de gueules au lion d'argent.	Per fess or and gules an eagle sable and a lion argent.
	Hestrud	D'or à la bande de gueules.	Or, a bend gules. (Hestrud and Maulde use the same arms.)
	Holque	D'azur à une vierge de carnation, vêtue d'argent et d'or, nimbée du même, assise sur un trône à l'antique aussi d'or, et tenant de sa dextre un sceptre du même et de la senestre l'Enfant Jésus de carnation, nimbé d'or et vêtu d'argent.	Azure a madonna proper vested and haloed argent and or sitting on an antique throne or holding in her right hand a sceptre and in her left the baby Jesus haloed or and vested argent.
	Hondeghem	D'argent à une fasce bretessée et contre-bretessée de gueules.	Argent a fess embattled counterembattled gules.
	Hondschoote	D'hermine à la bande de gueules chargée de 3 coquilles d'or	Ermine, on a bend gules, 3 escallops bendwise Or. (Ghyvelde and Hondschoote use the same arms.)
	Hon-Hergies	De gueules à deux clefs d'or adossées en sautoir, les pannetons en haut.	Gules, 2 keys in saltire addorsed Or. (Hon-Hergies, Moustier-en-Fagne and Taisnières-sur-Hon use the same arms.)
	Honnechy	D'azur au dragon d'or, lampassé de gueules, s'essorant en fasce.	Azure, a wyvern Or, langued gules. (Bévillers, Honnechy, Ramillies and Wambaix use the same arms.)
	Honnecourt-sur-Escaut	D'argent semé de billettes de gueules, au lion du même brochant sur le tout.	Argent billetty, a lion gules. (Bazenville, Haucourt-en-Cambrésis, Honnecourt-sur-Escaut and Sailly-lez-Cambrai use the same arms.)
	Hordain	D'or au chef cousu d'argent, au lion de gueules brochant sur le tout.	Or a chief argent overall a lion gules.
	Hornaing	De gueules à la fasce d'or, accompagnée en chef d'une devise vivrée du même.	Gules, a fess and in chief a vivre Or. [a vivre is a thin barrulet dancetty] (Hornaing and Mastaing use the same arms.)
	Houdain-lez-Bavay	D'or au chef bandé de gueules et d'argent	Or a chief bendy gules and argent.
	Houplin-Ancoisne	D'azur au chevron d'or accompagné de trois croix recroisettées au pied fiché du même. Anciennement Houplin-Lez-Seclin (jusqu'en 1950).	Azure a chevron between three cross crosslets fitchy or.
	Houplines	De sable au chef d'argent.	Sable, a chief argent. (Ennetières-en-Weppes, Houplines and Sailly-lez-Lannoy use the same arms.)
	Houtkerque	D'or à trois cors de chasse de sable.	Or three horns sable.
	Hoymille	D'or au chef échiqueté d'azur et d'argent de trois traits.	Or a chief chequy azure and argent.

== See also ==
- Armorial of the Communes of Nord (A–C)
- Armorial of the Communes of Nord (I–P)
- Armorial of the Communes of Nord (Q–Z)
