= Forenville =

Coordinates: 50°08′N 3°17′E

Forenville is a former commune in the Nord department in northern France, merged in 1964 with Séranvillers to create Séranvillers-Forenville

== Heraldry ==
Arms of Forenville	The arms of Forenville are blazoned : De sable à dix losanges accolées et aboutées d'argent, 3, 3, 3 et 1.

== See also ==
- Communes of the Nord department
