= Séranvillers =

Former commune in France

Coordinates: 50°07′N 3°17′E

Séranvillers is a former commune in the Nord department in northern France, merged in 1964 with Forenville to create Séranvillers-Forenville

== Heraldry ==
| Arms of Séranvillers | The arms of Séranvillers are blazoned : Azure, a chevron Or between 2 mullets of 6 and a cinqfoil Or. |

== See also ==
- Communes of the Nord department
