= Râches =

- Commune
- Râches Town Square

- Coat of arms
- Location of Râches
- Location within France Location within Hauts-de-France
- Coordinates: 50°25′03″N 3°08′15″E
- Country: France
- Region: Hauts-de-France
- Department: Nord
- Arrondissement: Douai
- Canton: Orchies
- Intercommunality: Douaisis Agglo

Government
  - Mayor (2020–2026): Édith Bourel
- Area^{1}: 4.87 km^{2} (1.88 sq mi)
- Elevation: 21 m (69 ft)
- Highest elevation: 44 m (144 ft)
- Lowest elevation: 17 m (56 ft)
- Population (2023): 2,672
  - Density: 549/km^{2} (1,420/sq mi)
- Time zone: UTC+01:00 (CET)
  - Summer (DST): UTC+02:00 (CEST)
- INSEE/Postal code: 59486 /59194
- ^{1} French Land Register data, which excludes lakes, ponds, glaciers > 1 km^{2} (0.386 sq mi or 247 acres) and river estuaries.

Râches (French pronunciation: [ʁaʃ]) is a commune in the Nord department in northern France.

== Population ==
Historical population
Year	Pop.	±% p.a.
1968	2,019	—
1975	2,148	+0.89%
1982	2,512	+2.26%
1990	2,385	−0.65%
1999	2,813	+1.85%
2007	2,731	−0.37%
2012	2,715	−0.12%
2017	2,740	+0.18%
2023	2,672	−0.42%
Source: INSEE

== Heraldry ==
Arms of Râches	The arms of Râches are blazoned : Or, a lion gules, armed and langued azure. (cf Pont-l'Abbé, Escarmain and Haussy)

== See also ==
- Communes of the Nord department
