= Gussignies =

- Commune
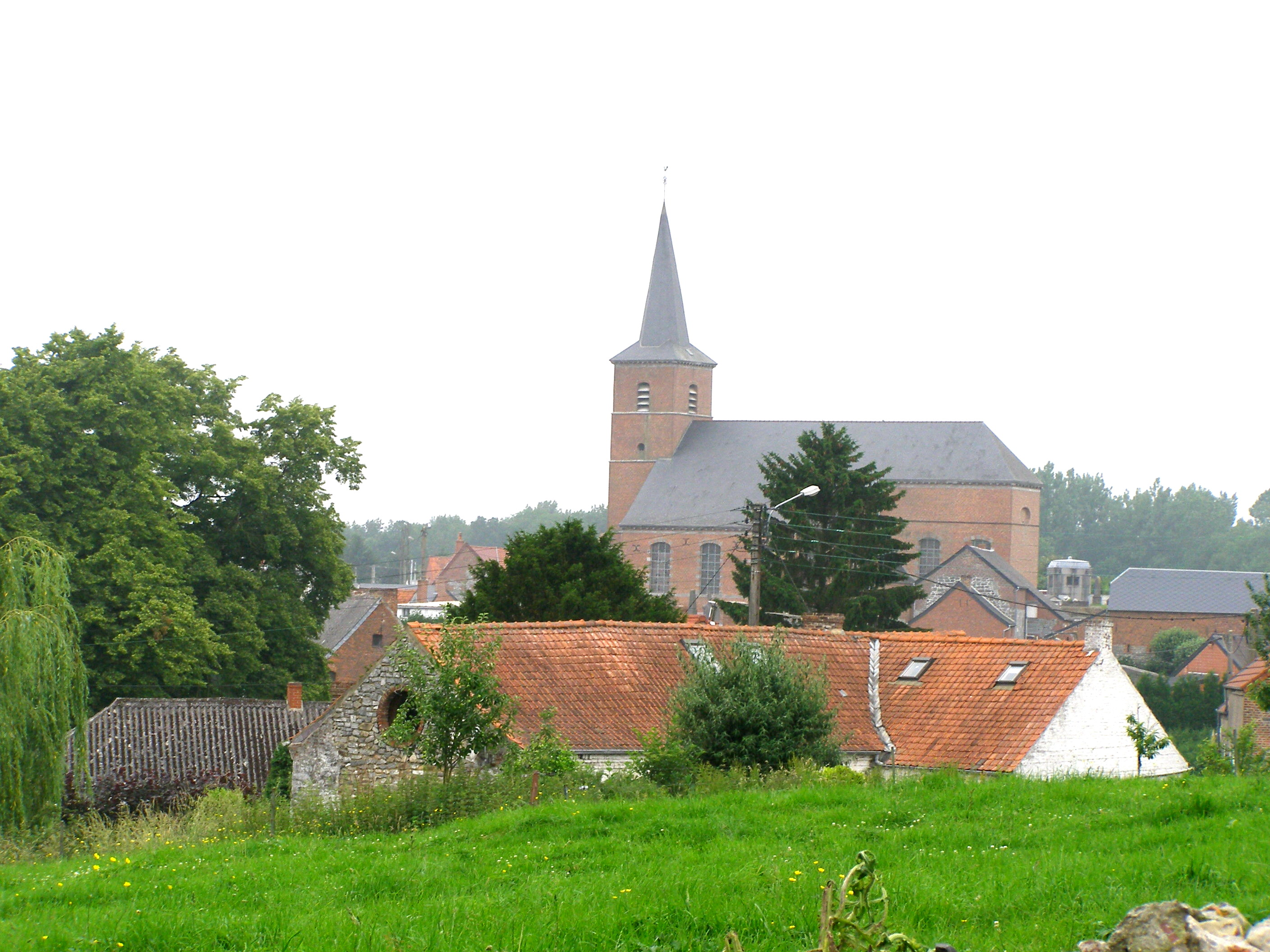
- A general view of Gussignies

- Coat of arms
- Location of Gussignies
- Location within France Location within Hauts-de-France
- Coordinates: 50°20′18″N 3°44′32″E
- Country: France
- Region: Hauts-de-France
- Department: Nord
- Arrondissement: Avesnes-sur-Helpe
- Canton: Aulnoye-Aymeries
- Intercommunality: CC Pays de Mormal

Government
  - Mayor (2020–2026): Sabine Kolasa
- Area^{1}: 3.46 km^{2} (1.34 sq mi)
- Elevation: 105 m (344 ft)
- Highest elevation: 131 m (430 ft)
- Lowest elevation: 63 m (207 ft)
- Population (2023): 353
  - Density: 102/km^{2} (264/sq mi)
- Time zone: UTC+01:00 (CET)
  - Summer (DST): UTC+02:00 (CEST)
- INSEE/Postal code: 59277 /59570
- ^{1} French Land Register data, which excludes lakes, ponds, glaciers > 1 km^{2} (0.386 sq mi or 247 acres) and river estuaries.

Gussignies (French pronunciation: [ɡysiɲi]) is a commune in the Nord department in northern France.

== Heraldry ==
Arms of Gussignies	The arms of Gussignies are blazoned : Or, 3 double-headed eagles gules. (Gussignies and Haynecourt use the same arms.)

== See also ==
- Communes of the Nord department
