= Escarmain =

- Commune
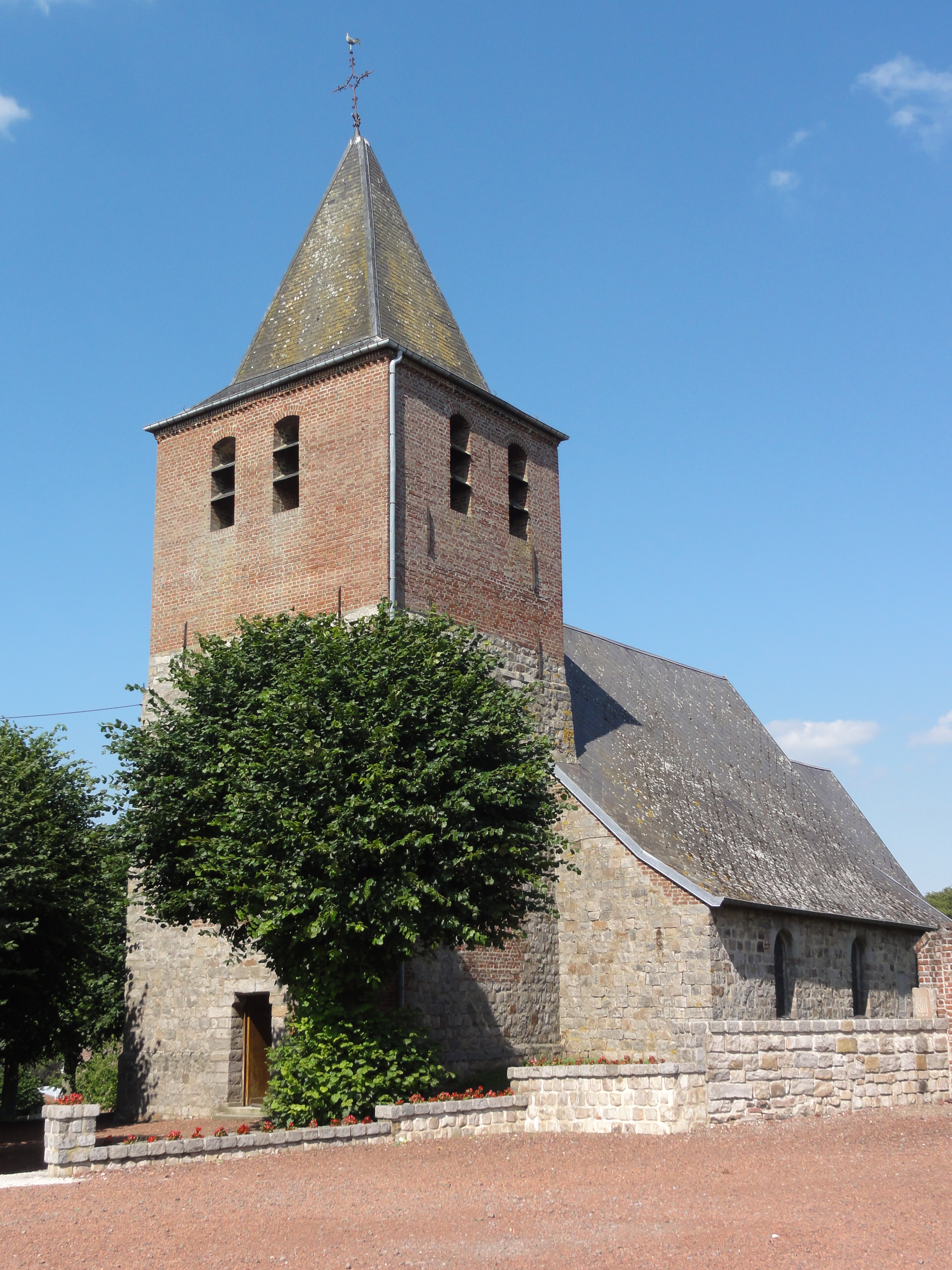
- The church in Escarmain

- Coat of arms
- Location of Escarmain
- Location within France Location within Hauts-de-France
- Coordinates: 50°13′46″N 3°32′52″E
- Country: France
- Region: Hauts-de-France
- Department: Nord
- Arrondissement: Cambrai
- Canton: Caudry
- Intercommunality: CC Pays Solesmois

Government
  - Mayor (2020–2026): Didier Escartin
- Area^{1}: 6.4 km^{2} (2.5 sq mi)
- Elevation: 78 m (256 ft)
- Highest elevation: 118 m (387 ft)
- Lowest elevation: 61 m (200 ft)
- Population (2023): 479
  - Density: 75/km^{2} (190/sq mi)
- Time zone: UTC+01:00 (CET)
  - Summer (DST): UTC+02:00 (CEST)
- INSEE/Postal code: 59204 /59213
- ^{1} French Land Register data, which excludes lakes, ponds, glaciers > 1 km^{2} (0.386 sq mi or 247 acres) and river estuaries.

Escarmain (French pronunciation: [ekaʁmɛ̃]) is a commune in the Nord department in northern France.

== Heraldry ==
Arms of Escarmain	The arms of Escarmain are blazoned : Or, a lion gules. (Pont-l'Abbé, Escarmain and Haussy (see also Râches) use the same arms.)

== See also ==
- Communes of the Nord department
