= Hergnies =

- Commune
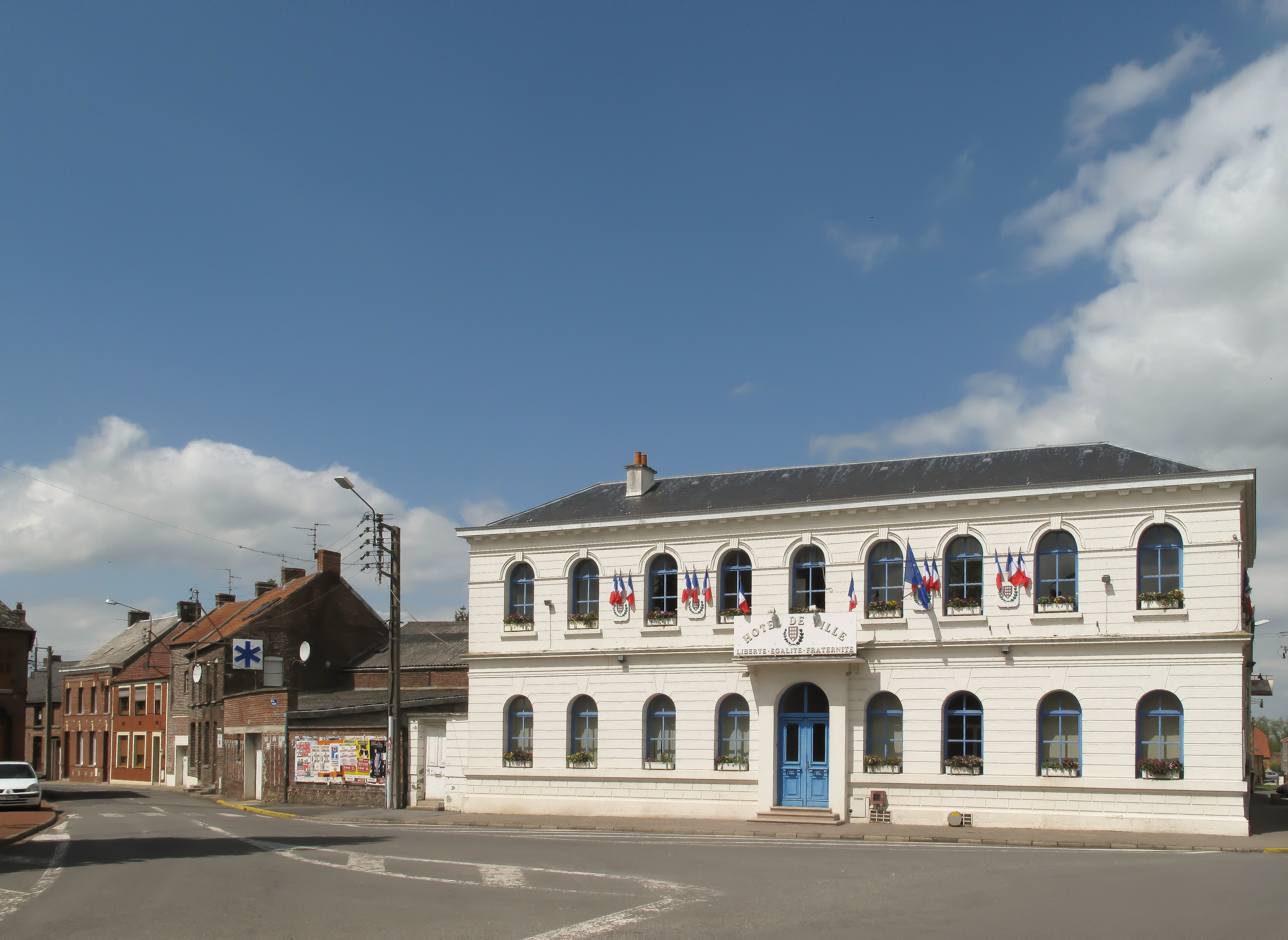
- The town hall in Hergnies

- Coat of arms
- Location of Hergnies
- Location within France Location within Hauts-de-France
- Coordinates: 50°28′30″N 3°31′23″E
- Country: France
- Region: Hauts-de-France
- Department: Nord
- Arrondissement: Valenciennes
- Canton: Marly
- Intercommunality: CA Valenciennes Métropole

Government
  - Mayor (2020–2026): Jacques Schneider
- Area^{1}: 10.75 km^{2} (4.15 sq mi)
- Elevation: 20 m (66 ft)
- Highest elevation: 39 m (128 ft)
- Lowest elevation: 14 m (46 ft)
- Population (2023): 4,479
  - Density: 416.7/km^{2} (1,079/sq mi)
- Time zone: UTC+01:00 (CET)
  - Summer (DST): UTC+02:00 (CEST)
- INSEE/Postal code: 59301 /59199
- ^{1} French Land Register data, which excludes lakes, ponds, glaciers > 1 km^{2} (0.386 sq mi or 247 acres) and river estuaries.

Hergnies (French pronunciation: [ɛʁɲi]) is a commune in the Nord department of northern France.

== Population ==
Historical population
Year	Pop.	±% p.a.
1968	3,568	—
1975	3,389	−0.73%
1982	3,300	−0.38%
1990	3,696	+1.43%
1999	3,849	+0.45%
2007	4,231	+1.19%
2012	4,335	+0.49%
2017	4,437	+0.47%
2023	4,479	+0.16%
Source: INSEE

== Heraldry ==
Arms of Hergnies	The arms of Hergnies are blazoned : Gules, 10 lozenges conjoined argent 3,3,3 and 1. (Fressain, Hergnies, Lallaing and Marpent use the same arms.)

== See also ==
- Communes of the Nord department
