= Fressain =

- Commune
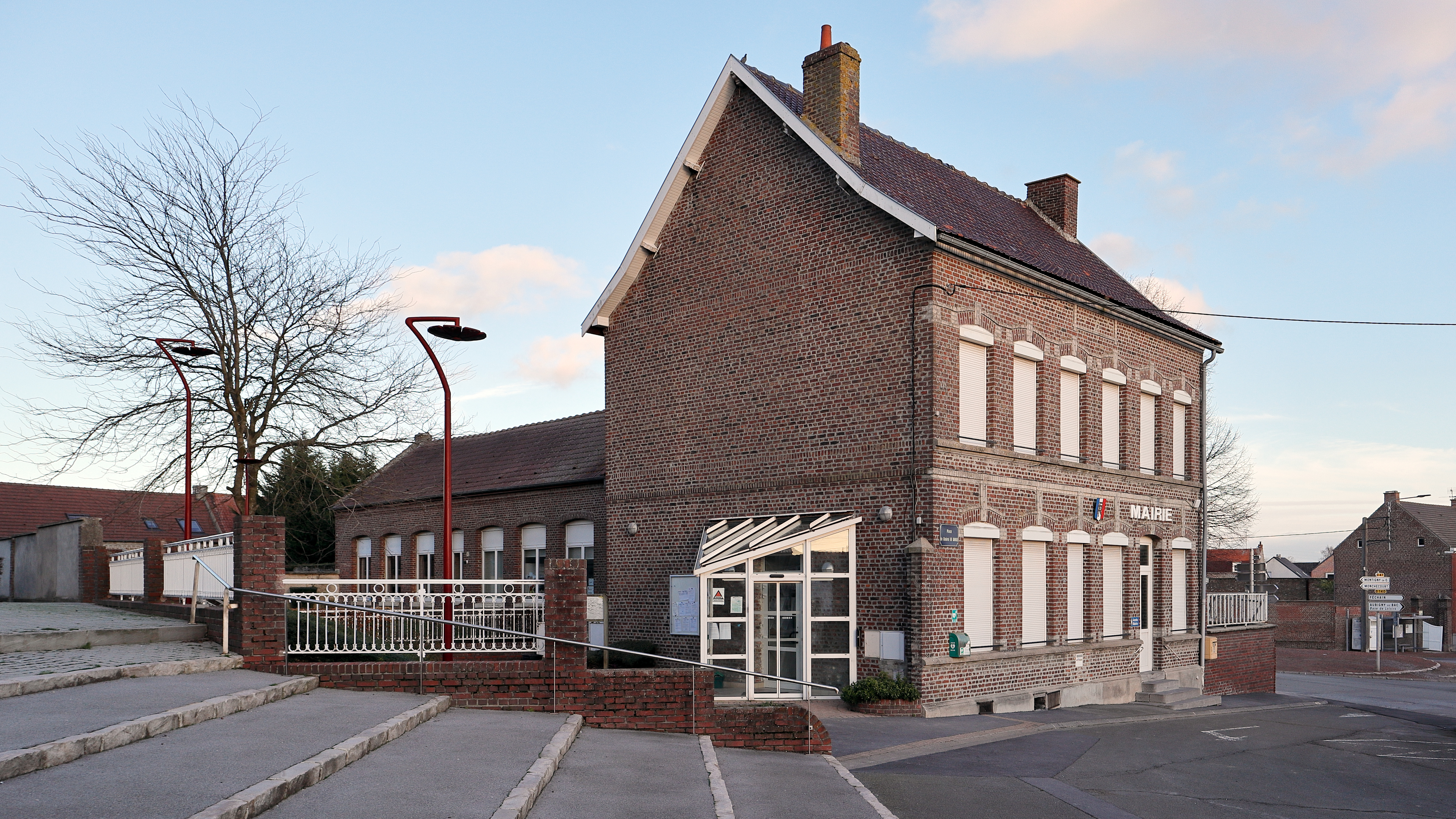
- The town hall

- Coat of arms
- Location of Fressain
- Location within France Location within Hauts-de-France
- Coordinates: 50°17′17″N 3°11′42″E
- Country: France
- Region: Hauts-de-France
- Department: Nord
- Arrondissement: Douai
- Canton: Aniche
- Intercommunality: Douaisis Agglo

Government
  - Mayor (2020–2026): Eric Silvain
- Area^{1}: 6.39 km^{2} (2.47 sq mi)
- Highest elevation: 81 m (266 ft)
- Lowest elevation: 40 m (130 ft)
- Population (2023): 919
  - Density: 144/km^{2} (372/sq mi)
- Time zone: UTC+01:00 (CET)
  - Summer (DST): UTC+02:00 (CEST)
- INSEE/Postal code: 59254 /59234
- ^{1} French Land Register data, which excludes lakes, ponds, glaciers > 1 km^{2} (0.386 sq mi or 247 acres) and river estuaries.

Fressain (French pronunciation: [fʁɛsɛ̃]) is a commune in the Nord department in northern France.

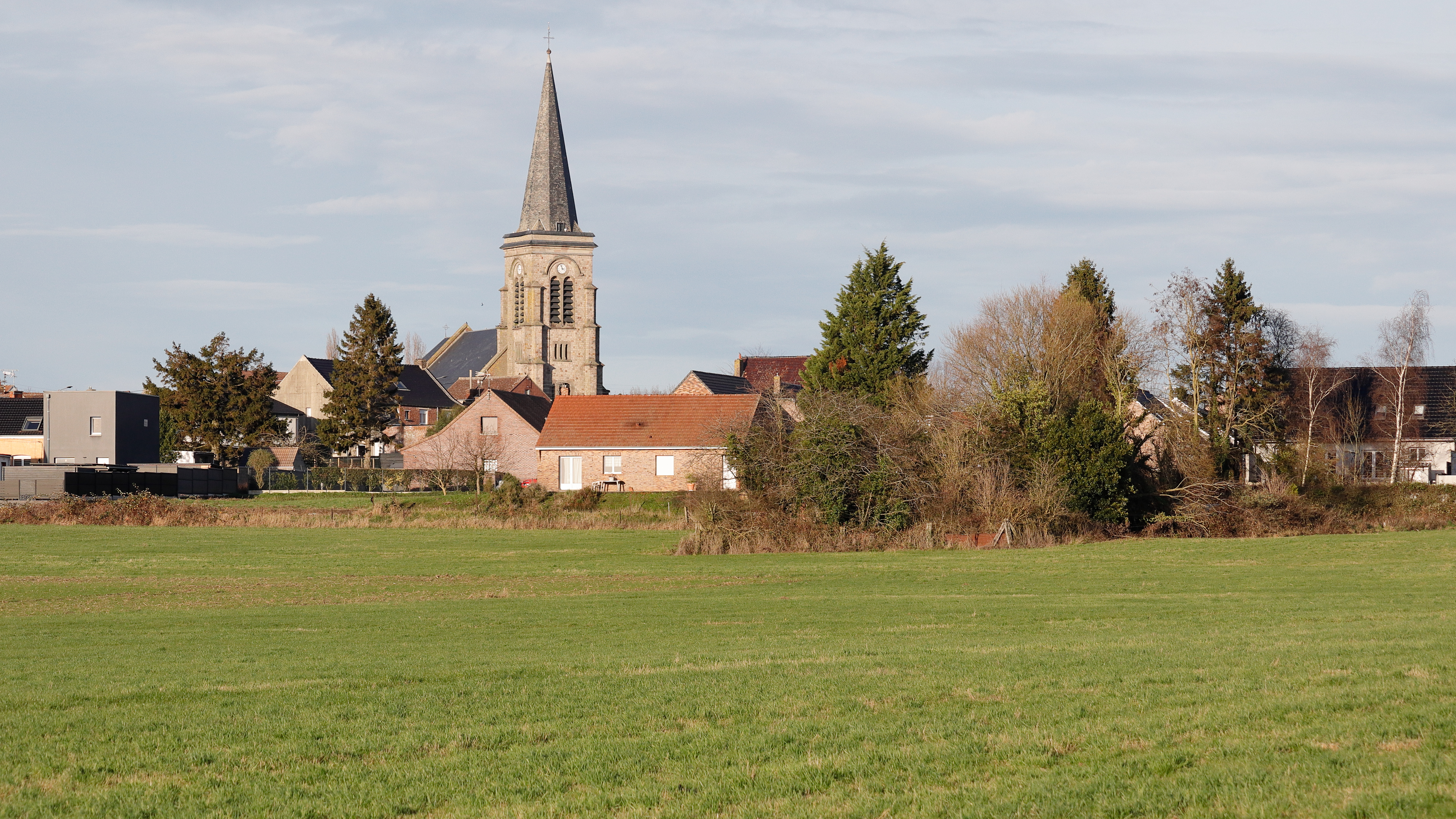

== Heraldry ==
| Arms of Fressain | The arms of Fressain are blazoned : Gules, 10 lozenges conjoined argent 3,3,3 and 1. (Fressain, Hergnies, Lallaing and Marpent use the same arms.) |

== See also ==
- Communes of the Nord department
