= Marpent =

- Commune
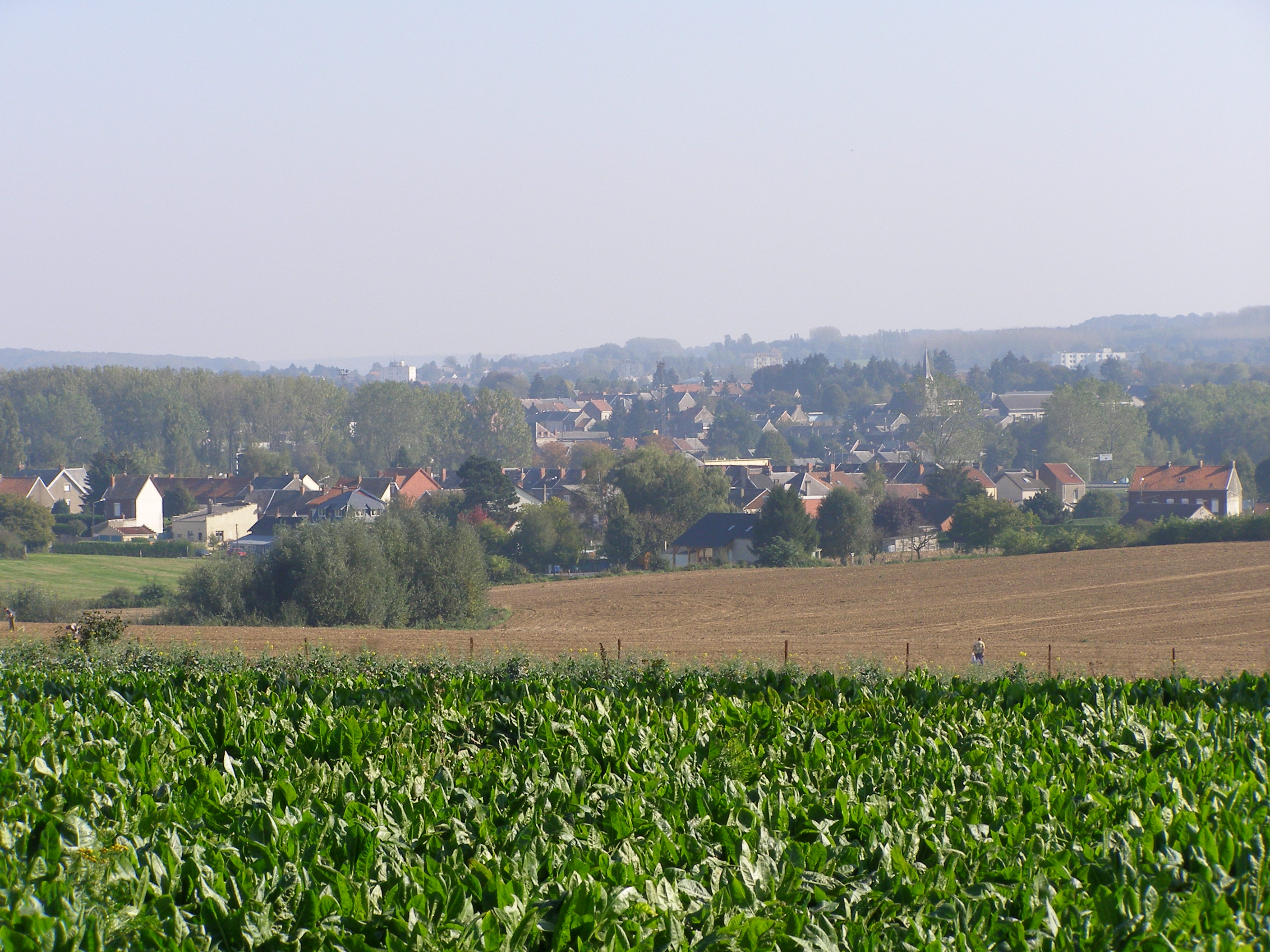
- A general view of Marpent

- Coat of arms
- Location of Marpent
- Location within France Location within Hauts-de-France
- Coordinates: 50°17′31″N 4°04′48″E
- Country: France
- Region: Hauts-de-France
- Department: Nord
- Arrondissement: Avesnes-sur-Helpe
- Canton: Maubeuge
- Intercommunality: CA Maubeuge Val de Sambre

Government
  - Mayor (2020–2026): Jean-Marie Allain
- Area^{1}: 4.83 km^{2} (1.86 sq mi)
- Elevation: 124 m (407 ft)
- Highest elevation: 195 m (640 ft)
- Lowest elevation: 122 m (400 ft)
- Population (2023): 2,653
  - Density: 549/km^{2} (1,420/sq mi)
- Time zone: UTC+01:00 (CET)
  - Summer (DST): UTC+02:00 (CEST)
- INSEE/Postal code: 59385 /59164
- ^{1} French Land Register data, which excludes lakes, ponds, glaciers > 1 km^{2} (0.386 sq mi or 247 acres) and river estuaries.

Marpent (French pronunciation: [maʁpɑ̃]) is a commune in the Nord department in northern France. It hosts an important factory of railway rolling stock, the former Baume et Marpent.

== Population ==
Historical population
Year	Pop.	±% p.a.
1968	3,084	—
1975	3,155	+0.33%
1982	2,825	−1.57%
1990	2,717	−0.49%
1999	2,649	−0.28%
2007	2,619	−0.14%
2012	2,705	+0.65%
2017	2,748	+0.32%
2023	2,653	−0.58%
Source: INSEE

== Education ==
The École primaire publique Maurice Fostier is located in Marpent.

== Heraldry ==
Arms of Marpent	The arms of Marpent are blazoned : Gules, 10 lozenges conjoined argent 3,3,3 and 1. (Fressain, Hergnies, Lallaing and Marpent use the same arms.)

== See also ==
- Communes of the Nord department
