= Dompierre-sur-Helpe =

- Commune
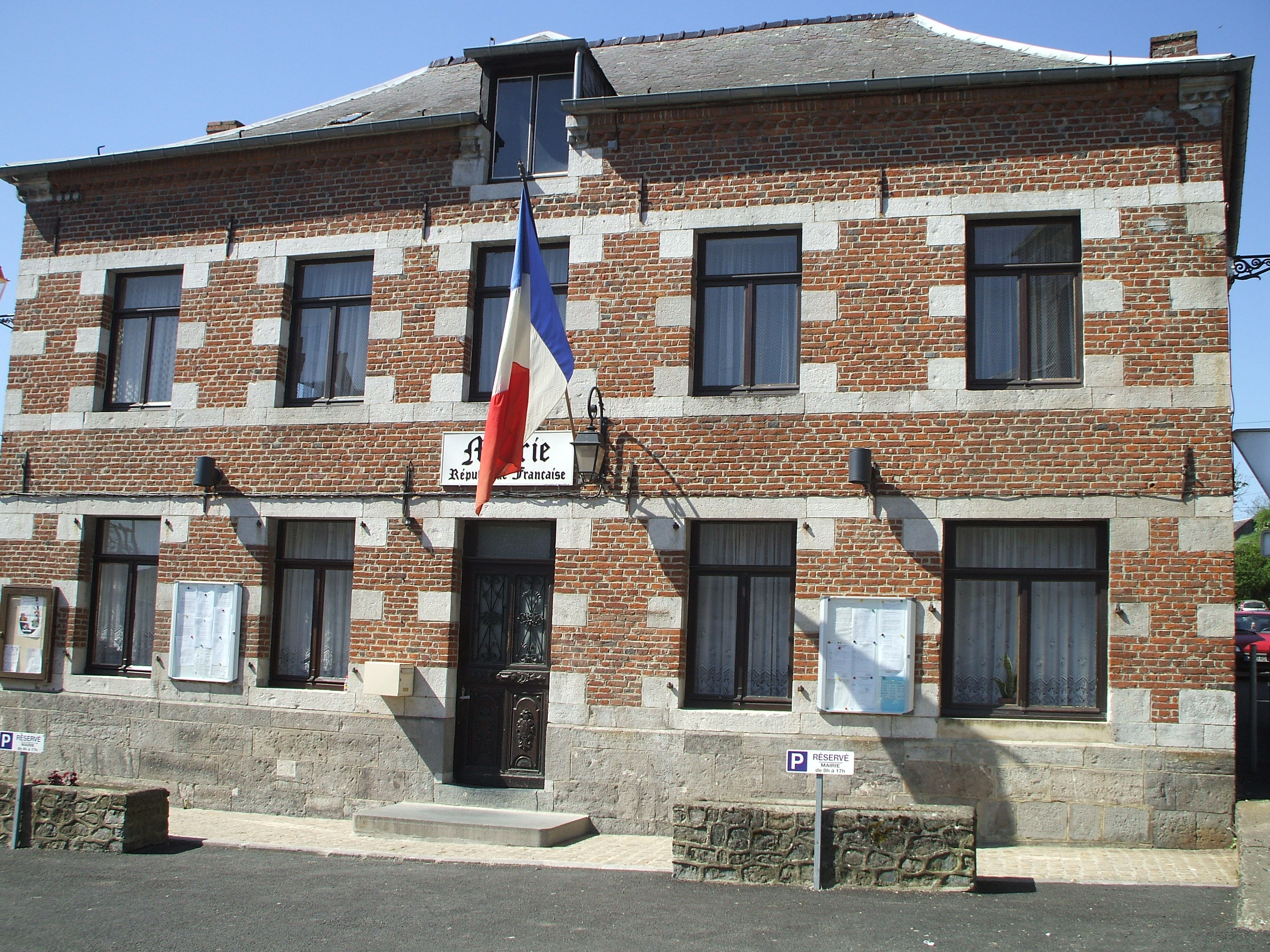
- The town hall in Dompierre-sur-Helpe

- Coat of arms
- Location of Dompierre-sur-Helpe
- Location within France Location within Hauts-de-France
- Coordinates: 50°08′44″N 3°52′02″E
- Country: France
- Region: Hauts-de-France
- Department: Nord
- Arrondissement: Avesnes-sur-Helpe
- Canton: Avesnes-sur-Helpe
- Intercommunality: Cœur de l'Avesnois

Government
  - Mayor (2020–2026): Jean-Pierre Libert
- Area^{1}: 13.2 km^{2} (5.1 sq mi)
- Elevation: 165 m (541 ft)
- Highest elevation: 191 m (627 ft)
- Lowest elevation: 132 m (433 ft)
- Population (2023): 815
  - Density: 61.7/km^{2} (160/sq mi)
- Time zone: UTC+01:00 (CET)
  - Summer (DST): UTC+02:00 (CEST)
- INSEE/Postal code: 59177 /59440
- ^{1} French Land Register data, which excludes lakes, ponds, glaciers > 1 km^{2} (0.386 sq mi or 247 acres) and river estuaries.

Dompierre-sur-Helpe (French pronunciation: [dɔ̃pjɛʁ syʁ ɛlp], literally Dompierre on Helpe) is a commune in the Nord department in northern France.

== Heraldry ==
Arms of Dompierre-sur-Helpe	The arms of Dompierre-sur-Helpe are blazoned : Azure, a chevron argent between 3 eagles Or langued and armed gules. (Dompierre-sur-Helpe and Écuélin use the same arms.)

== See also ==
- Communes of the Nord department
