= Guesnain =

- Commune
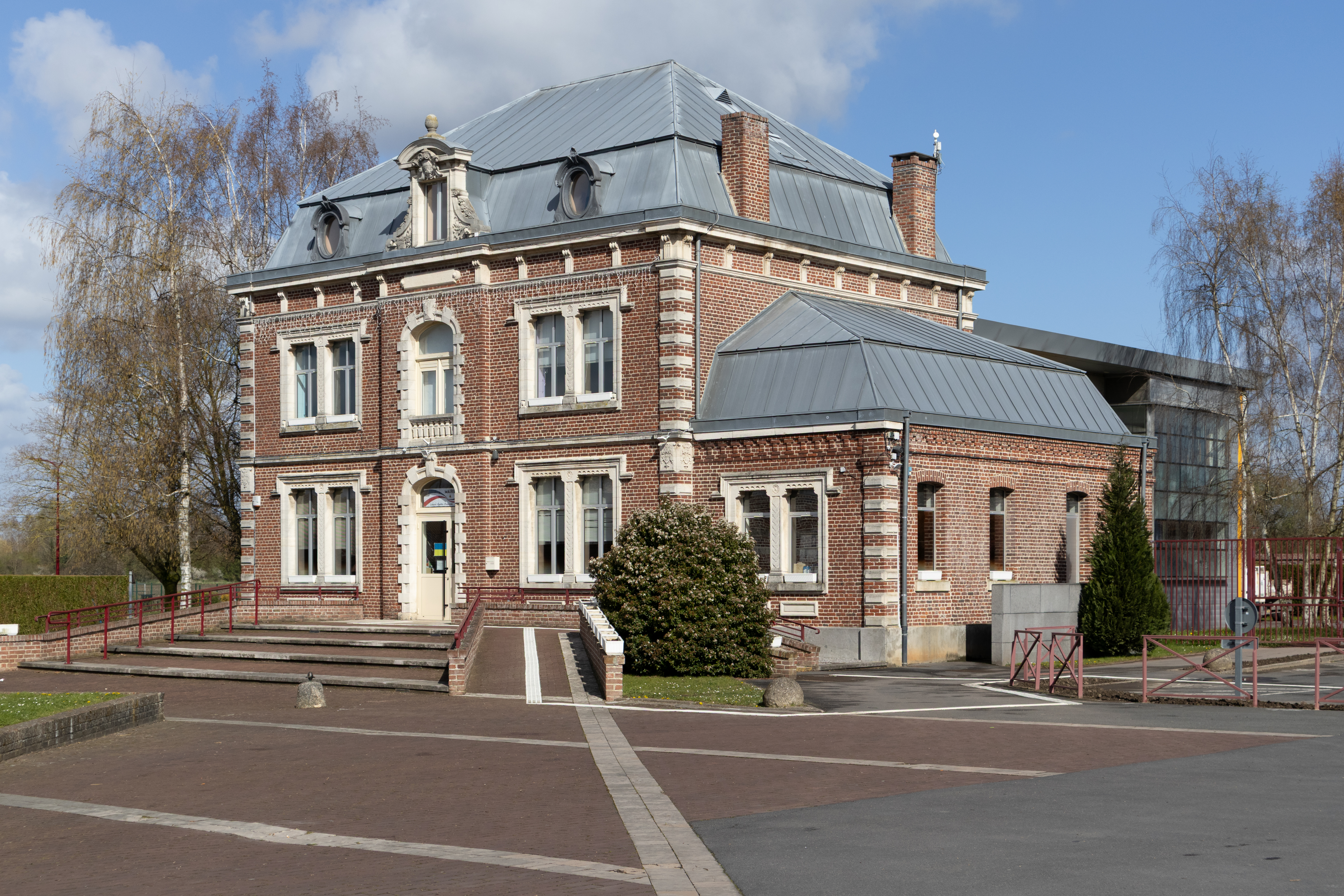
- The town hall

- Coat of arms
- Location of Guesnain
- Location within France Location within Hauts-de-France
- Coordinates: 50°21′11″N 3°08′42″E
- Country: France
- Region: Hauts-de-France
- Department: Nord
- Arrondissement: Douai
- Canton: Aniche
- Intercommunality: Douaisis Agglo

Government
  - Mayor (2020–2026): Maryline Lucas
- Area^{1}: 4.05 km^{2} (1.56 sq mi)
- Elevation: 23 m (75 ft)
- Highest elevation: 42 m (138 ft)
- Lowest elevation: 20 m (66 ft)
- Population (2023): 4,635
  - Density: 1,140/km^{2} (2,960/sq mi)
- Time zone: UTC+01:00 (CET)
  - Summer (DST): UTC+02:00 (CEST)
- INSEE/Postal code: 59276 /59287
- Website: https://ville-guesnain.fr
- ^{1} French Land Register data, which excludes lakes, ponds, glaciers > 1 km^{2} (0.386 sq mi or 247 acres) and river estuaries.

Guesnain (French pronunciation: [ɡenɛ̃]) is a commune in the Nord department in northern France.

== Population ==
Historical population

Year	Pop.	±% p.a.
1793	360	—
1821	460	+0.88%
1846	479	+0.16%
1872	531	+0.40%
1901	1,748	+4.19%
1926	2,841	+1.96%
1946	3,564	+1.14%
1962	4,790	+1.86%
1968	4,702	−0.31%

Year	Pop.	±% p.a.
1975	4,703	+0.00%
1982	5,076	+1.10%
1990	5,048	−0.07%
1999	4,882	−0.37%
2007	4,605	−0.73%
2012	4,692	+0.38%
2017	4,677	−0.06%
2023	4,635	−0.15%

Source: EHESS and INSEE (1968-2023)

== History ==
An human implatation dating from Merovingians has been attested by excavations, near the church, at the place where the actual médiatheque has been built.

The domain has belonged to the Maubeuge Abbey until the Revolution.

The equipment has been broken during First World War. The exploitation of the coal could retake since 1921. This activity has definitely stopped in 1964.

== Heraldry ==
Arms of Guesnain	The arms of Guesnain are blazoned : Argent, 3 chevrons sable. (Erchin and Guesnain use the same arms.)

== See also ==
- Communes of the Nord department
