= Lallaing =

- Commune
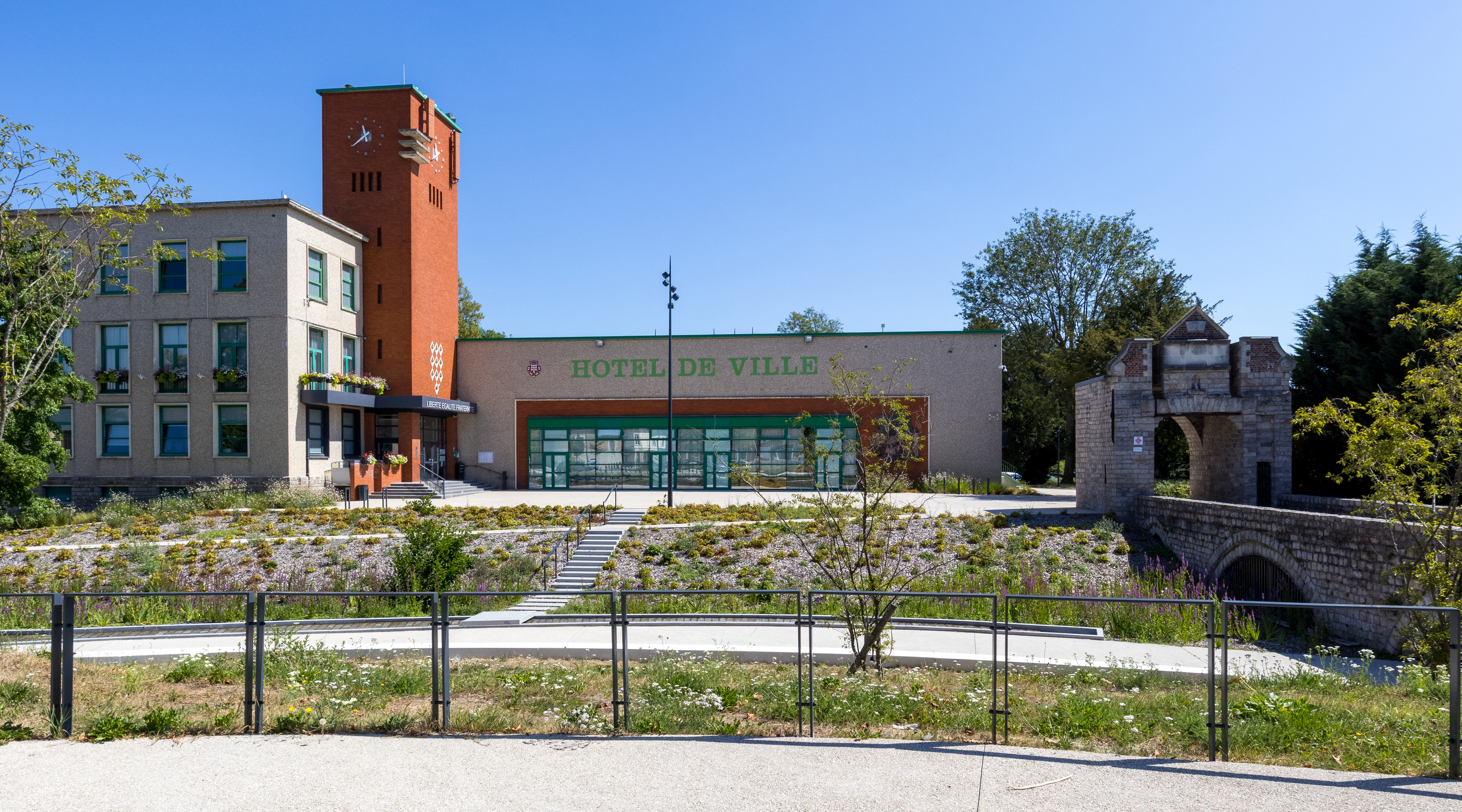
- The town hall in Lallaing

- Coat of arms
- Location of Lallaing
- Location within France Location within Hauts-de-France
- Coordinates: 50°23′24″N 3°10′08″E
- Country: France
- Region: Hauts-de-France
- Department: Nord
- Arrondissement: Douai
- Canton: Sin-le-Noble
- Intercommunality: Douaisis Agglo

Government
  - Mayor (2020–2026): Jean-Paul Fontaine
- Area^{1}: 5.99 km^{2} (2.31 sq mi)
- Elevation: 20 m (66 ft)
- Highest elevation: 30 m (98 ft)
- Lowest elevation: 16 m (52 ft)
- Population (2023): 6,287
  - Density: 1,050/km^{2} (2,720/sq mi)
- Time zone: UTC+01:00 (CET)
  - Summer (DST): UTC+02:00 (CEST)
- INSEE/Postal code: 59327 /59167
- ^{1} French Land Register data, which excludes lakes, ponds, glaciers > 1 km^{2} (0.386 sq mi or 247 acres) and river estuaries.

Lallaing (French pronunciation: [lalɛ̃]) is a commune in the Nord department in northern France.

== Population ==
Historical population
Year	Pop.	±% p.a.
1968	8,813	—
1975	8,399	−0.69%
1982	8,174	−0.39%
1990	8,001	−0.27%
1999	6,999	−1.48%
2007	6,533	−0.86%
2012	6,405	−0.39%
2017	6,231	−0.55%
2023	6,287	+0.15%
Source: INSEE

== Heraldry ==
Arms of Lallaing	The arms of Lallaing are blazoned: Gules, 10 lozenges conjoined argent 3,3,3 and 1. (Fressain, Hergnies, Lallaing and Marpent use the same arms.)

== See also ==
- Communes of the Nord department
- de Lalaing family
