= Sailly-lez-Lannoy =

- Commune
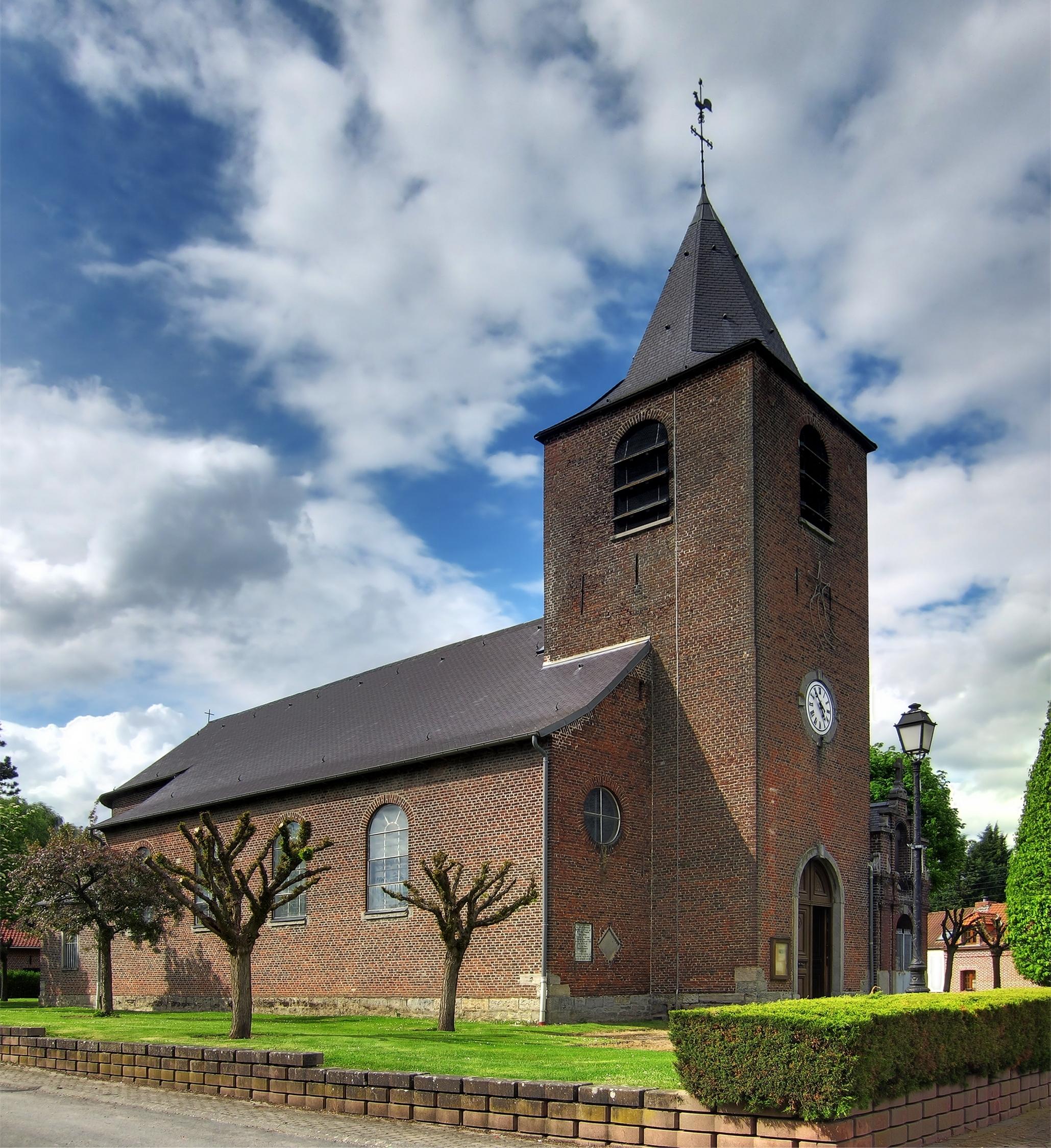
- The church in Sailly-lez-Lannoy

- Coat of arms
- Location of Sailly-lez-Lannoy
- Location within France Location within Hauts-de-France
- Coordinates: 50°38′51″N 3°13′28″E
- Country: France
- Region: Hauts-de-France
- Department: Nord
- Arrondissement: Lille
- Canton: Villeneuve-d'Ascq
- Intercommunality: Métropole Européenne de Lille

Government
  - Mayor (2020–2026): Éric Skyronka
- Area^{1}: 4.43 km^{2} (1.71 sq mi)
- Elevation: 35 m (115 ft)
- Highest elevation: 48 m (157 ft)
- Lowest elevation: 22 m (72 ft)
- Population (2023): 1,923
  - Density: 434/km^{2} (1,120/sq mi)
- Time zone: UTC+01:00 (CET)
  - Summer (DST): UTC+02:00 (CEST)
- INSEE/Postal code: 59522 /59390
- ^{1} French Land Register data, which excludes lakes, ponds, glaciers > 1 km^{2} (0.386 sq mi or 247 acres) and river estuaries.

Sailly-lez-Lannoy (French pronunciation: [saji le lanwa], literally Sailly near Lannoy; Dutch: Zelleken) is a commune in the Nord department in northern France. It is part of the Métropole Européenne de Lille.

== Heraldry ==
Arms of Sailly-lez-Lannoy	The arms of Sailly-lez-Lannoy are blazoned : Sable, a chief argent. (Ennetières-en-Weppes, Houplines and Sailly-lez-Lannoy use the same arms.)

== See also ==
- Communes of the Nord department
