= Eringhem =

- Commune
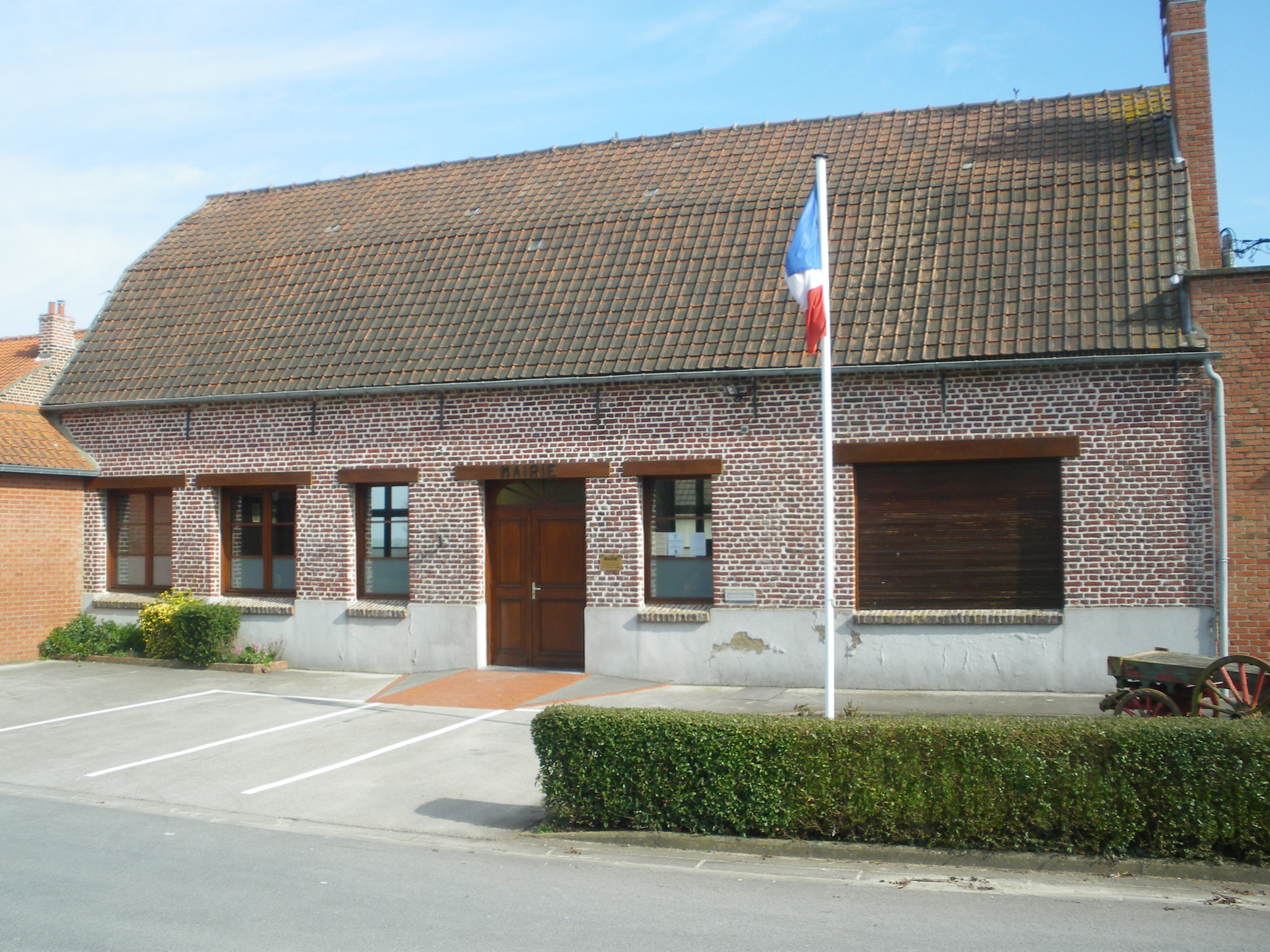
- Eringhem: the Mairie

- Coat of arms
- Location of Eringhem
- Location within France Location within Hauts-de-France
- Coordinates: 50°53′49″N 2°20′39″E
- Country: France
- Region: Hauts-de-France
- Department: Nord
- Arrondissement: Dunkerque
- Canton: Wormhout
- Intercommunality: Hauts de Flandre

Government
  - Mayor (2021–2026): Murielle Feryn
- Area^{1}: 11.53 km^{2} (4.45 sq mi)
- Elevation: 9 m (30 ft)
- Highest elevation: 40 m (130 ft)
- Lowest elevation: 0 m (0 ft)
- Population (2023): 462
  - Density: 40.1/km^{2} (104/sq mi)
- Time zone: UTC+01:00 (CET)
  - Summer (DST): UTC+02:00 (CEST)
- INSEE/Postal code: 59200 /59470
- ^{1} French Land Register data, which excludes lakes, ponds, glaciers > 1 km^{2} (0.386 sq mi or 247 acres) and river estuaries.

Eringhem (French pronunciation: [eʁɛ̃ɡɛm]; Dutch: Eringem) is a commune in the Nord department and Hauts-de-France region of northern France.

Located about halfway between Dunkirk and Saint-Omer in the historical region of French Westhoek, its West Flemish name is Eringem.

The village churchyard contains the graves of three Royal Air Force men killed in action in May 1940, among them Pilot Officer Sir Arnold Talbot Wilson.

== Population ==
Historical population
Year	Pop.	±% p.a.
1968	401	—
1975	381	−0.73%
1982	365	−0.61%
1990	413	+1.56%
1999	419	+0.16%
2007	454	+1.01%
2012	471	+0.74%
2017	479	+0.34%
2023	462	−0.60%
Source: INSEE

== History ==
Eringhem is first mentioned in documents dating from the 9th century, at which time it was known as Ebersingahem, meaning the homestead of Eberso's people. Until the French Revolution, the settlement belonged to the castellany of Bourbourg. A papal bull issued by Pope Paschal II in 1113 confirmed the Count of Flanders' grant of the land to the Abbey of Bourbourg. In the 12th century, the Count of Guînes founded a convent at Eringhem. The château of Eringhem is mentioned as belonging to Louis of Luxembourg in 1458.

== Heraldry ==
Arms of Eringhem	The arms of Eringhem are blazoned : Gyronny of 10 Or and azure, an inescutcheon gules. (Eringhem and Faumont use the same arms.)

== See also ==
- Communes of the Nord department
