= Ennetières-en-Weppes =

- Commune
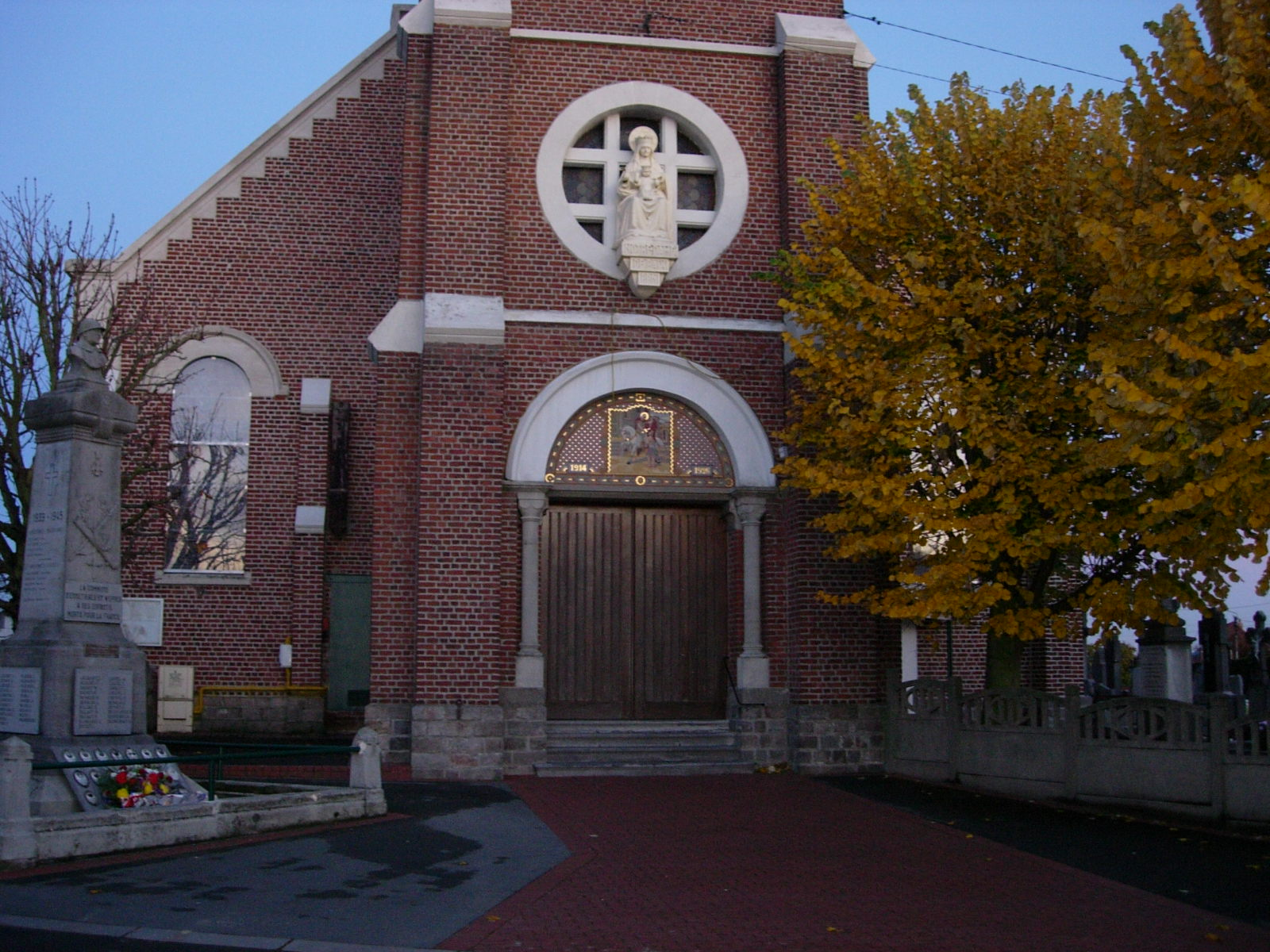
- Église Saint-Martin

- Coat of arms
- Location of Ennetières-en-Weppes
- Location within France Location within Hauts-de-France
- Coordinates: 50°38′07″N 2°56′32″E
- Country: France
- Region: Hauts-de-France
- Department: Nord
- Arrondissement: Lille
- Canton: Lille-6
- Intercommunality: Métropole Européenne de Lille

Government
  - Mayor (2020–2026): Jean-Claude Flinois
- Area^{1}: 10.44 km^{2} (4.03 sq mi)
- Elevation: 41 m (135 ft)
- Population (2023): 1,280
  - Density: 123/km^{2} (318/sq mi)
- Time zone: UTC+01:00 (CET)
  - Summer (DST): UTC+02:00 (CEST)
- INSEE/Postal code: 59196 /59320
- ^{1} French Land Register data, which excludes lakes, ponds, glaciers > 1 km^{2} (0.386 sq mi or 247 acres) and river estuaries.

Ennetières-en-Weppes (French pronunciation: [ɛntjɛʁ ɑ̃ wɛp]) is a commune in the Nord department in northern France. It is part of the Métropole Européenne de Lille.

== Heraldry ==
Arms of Ennetières-en-Weppes	The arms of Ennetières-en-Weppes are blazoned : Sable, a chief argent. (Ennetières-en-Weppes, Houplines and Sailly-lez-Lannoy use the same arms.)

== See also ==
- Communes of the Nord department
