= Écuélin =

- Commune
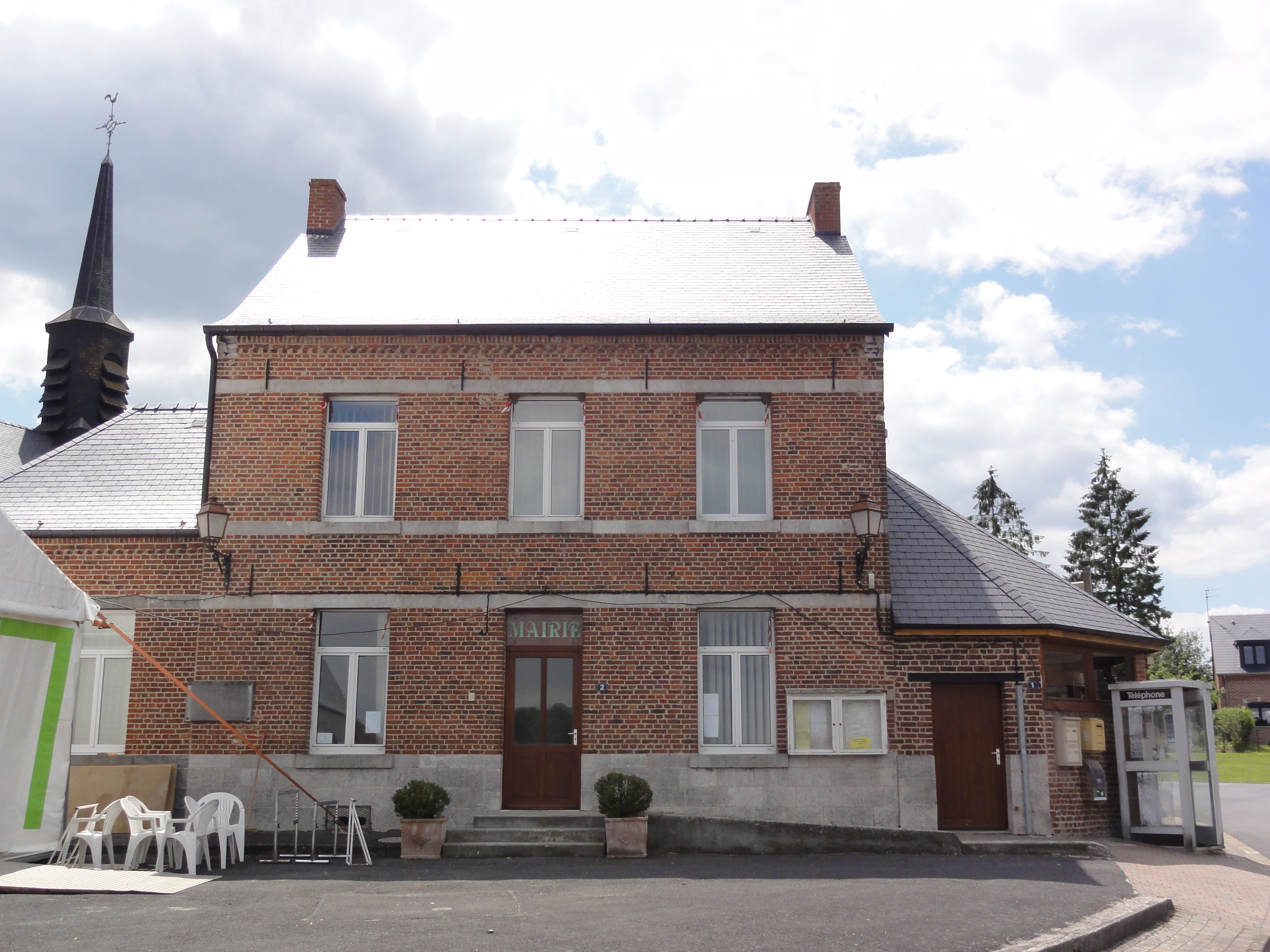
- The town hall in Écuélin

- Coat of arms
- Location of Écuélin
- Location within France Location within Hauts-de-France
- Coordinates: 50°11′41″N 3°54′29″E
- Country: France
- Region: Hauts-de-France
- Department: Nord
- Arrondissement: Avesnes-sur-Helpe
- Canton: Aulnoye-Aymeries
- Intercommunality: CA Maubeuge Val de Sambre

Government
  - Mayor (2020–2026): Emmanuelle Delabre
- Area^{1}: 3.4 km^{2} (1.3 sq mi)
- Elevation: 181 m (594 ft)
- Highest elevation: 185 m (607 ft)
- Lowest elevation: 150 m (490 ft)
- Population (2023): 145
  - Density: 43/km^{2} (110/sq mi)
- Time zone: UTC+01:00 (CET)
  - Summer (DST): UTC+02:00 (CEST)
- INSEE/Postal code: 59188 /59620
- ^{1} French Land Register data, which excludes lakes, ponds, glaciers > 1 km^{2} (0.386 sq mi or 247 acres) and river estuaries.

Écuélin (French pronunciation: [ekɥelɛ̃]) is a commune in the Nord department in northern France.

== Heraldry ==
Arms of Écuélin	The arms of Écuélin are blazoned : Azure, a chevron argent between 3 eagles Or langued and armed gules. (Dompierre-sur-Helpe and Écuélin use the same arms.)

== See also ==
- Communes of the Nord department
