= Faumont =

- Commune
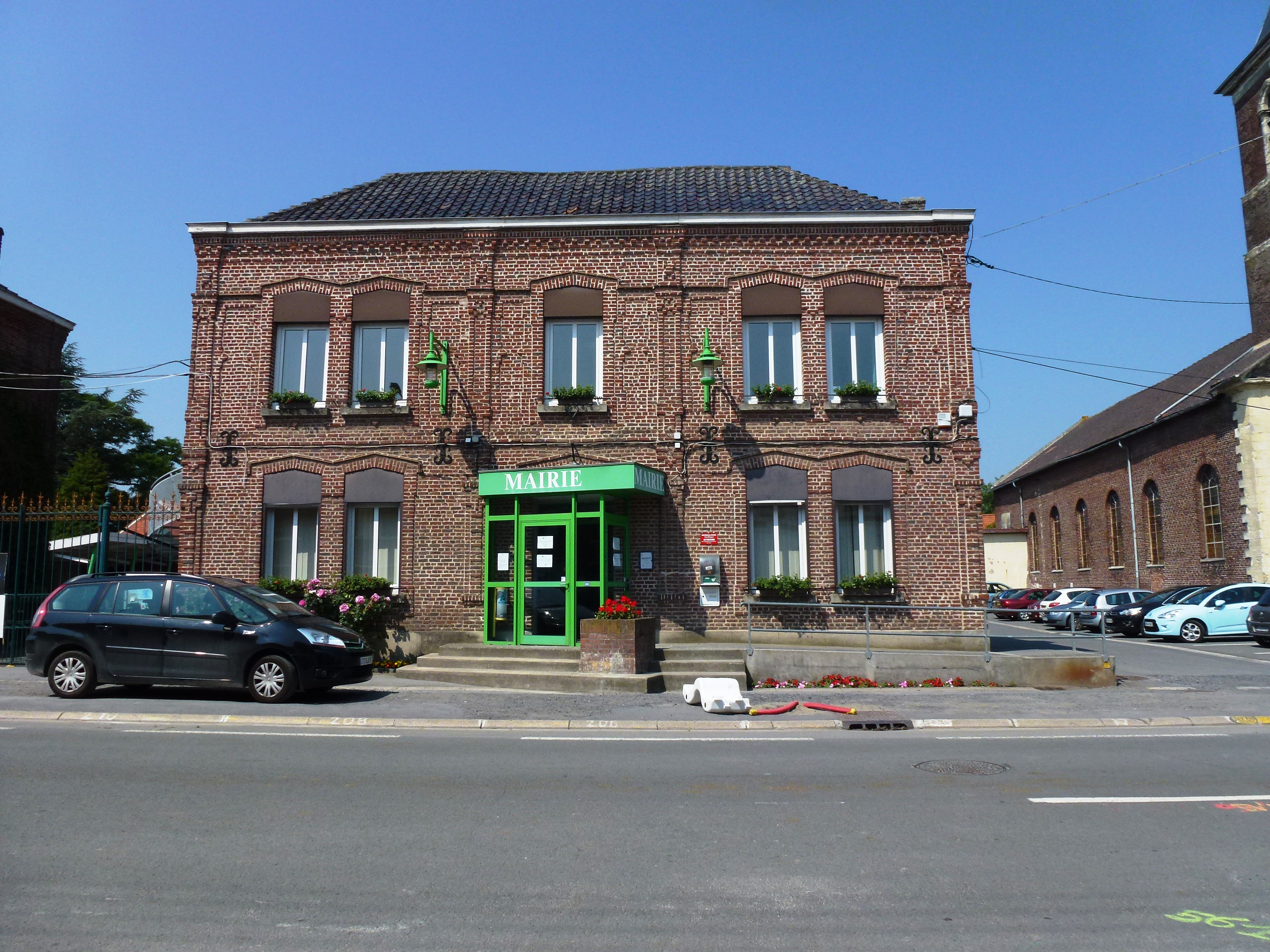
- The town hall in Faumont

- Coat of arms
- Location of Faumont
- Location within France Location within Hauts-de-France
- Coordinates: 50°27′40″N 3°08′17″E
- Country: France
- Region: Hauts-de-France
- Department: Nord
- Arrondissement: Douai
- Canton: Orchies
- Intercommunality: Douaisis Agglo

Government
  - Mayor (2023–2026): Florence Georges
- Area^{1}: 9.58 km^{2} (3.70 sq mi)
- Elevation: 38 m (125 ft)
- Highest elevation: 46 m (151 ft)
- Lowest elevation: 27 m (89 ft)
- Population (2023): 2,278
  - Density: 238/km^{2} (616/sq mi)
- Time zone: UTC+01:00 (CET)
  - Summer (DST): UTC+02:00 (CEST)
- INSEE/Postal code: 59222 /59310
- ^{1} French Land Register data, which excludes lakes, ponds, glaciers > 1 km^{2} (0.386 sq mi or 247 acres) and river estuaries.

Faumont (French pronunciation: [fomɔ̃]) is a commune in the Nord department in northern France.

== Population ==
Historical population
| Year | Pop. | ±% p.a. |
|---|---|---|
| 1968 | 1,277 | — |
| 1975 | 1,342 | +0.71% |
| 1982 | 1,384 | +0.44% |
| 1990 | 1,663 | +2.32% |
| 1999 | 1,917 | +1.59% |
| 2007 | 2,097 | +1.13% |
| 2012 | 2,127 | +0.28% |
| 2017 | 2,172 | +0.42% |
| 2023 | 2,278 | +0.80% |
Source: INSEE

== Heraldry ==
| Arms of Faumont | The arms of Faumont are blazoned : Gyronny of 10 Or and azure, an inescutcheon gules. (Eringhem and Faumont use the same arms.) |

== See also ==
- Communes of the Nord department
