= Haynecourt =

- Commune
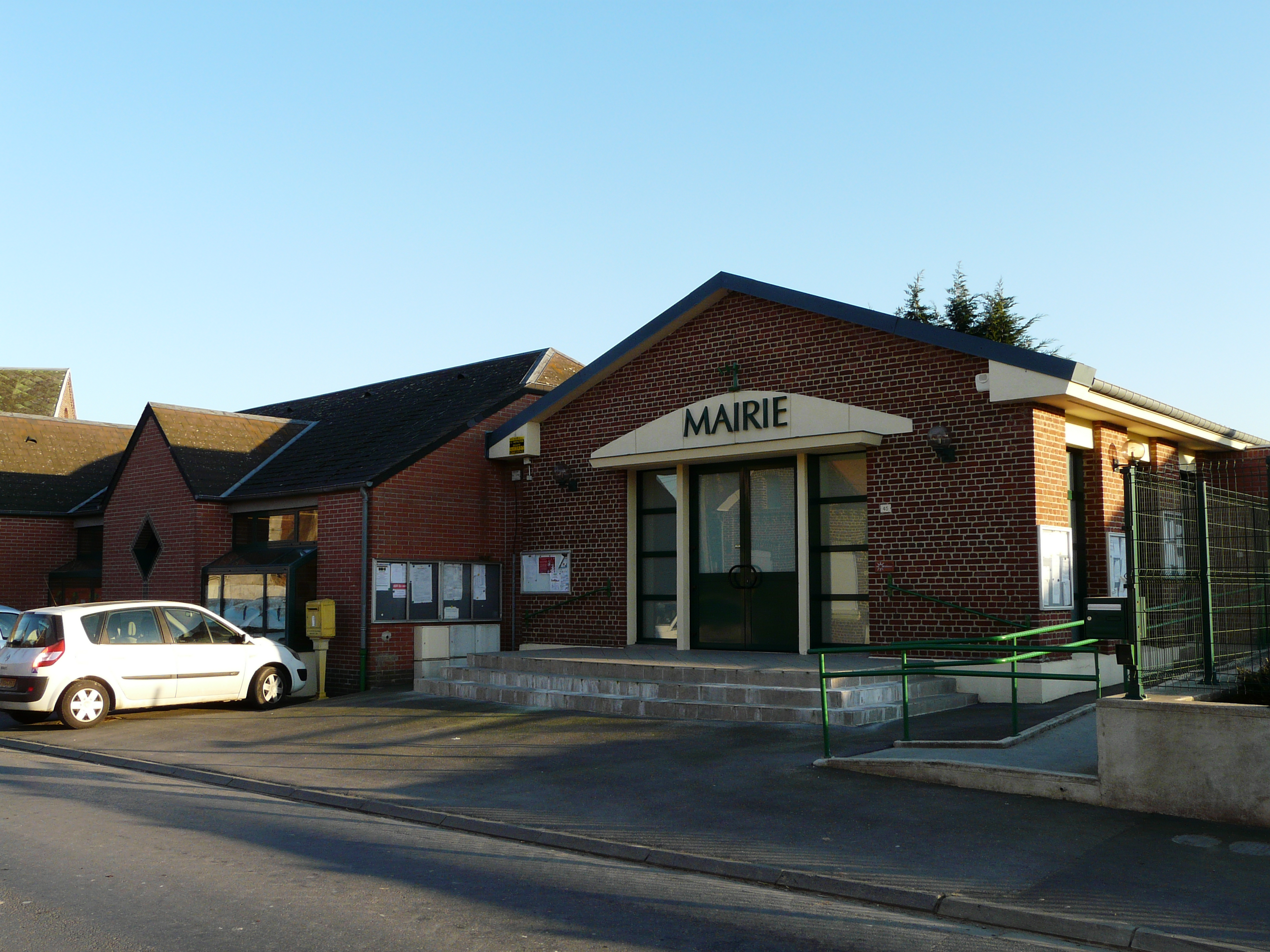
- The town hall in Haynecourt

- Coat of arms
- Location of Haynecourt
- Location within France Location within Hauts-de-France
- Coordinates: 50°12′44″N 3°09′43″E
- Country: France
- Region: Hauts-de-France
- Department: Nord
- Arrondissement: Cambrai
- Canton: Cambrai
- Intercommunality: CA Cambrai

Government
  - Mayor (2021–2026): Bernard Hurez
- Area^{1}: 5.92 km^{2} (2.29 sq mi)
- Elevation: 63 m (207 ft)
- Highest elevation: 81 m (266 ft)
- Lowest elevation: 58 m (190 ft)
- Population (2023): 307
  - Density: 51.9/km^{2} (134/sq mi)
- Time zone: UTC+01:00 (CET)
  - Summer (DST): UTC+02:00 (CEST)
- INSEE/Postal code: 59294 /59268
- ^{1} French Land Register data, which excludes lakes, ponds, glaciers > 1 km^{2} (0.386 sq mi or 247 acres) and river estuaries.

Haynecourt (French pronunciation: [ɛnkuʁ]) is a commune in the Nord department in northern France.

== Heraldry ==
Arms of Haynecourt	The arms of Haynecourt are blazoned : Or, 3 double-headed eagles gules. (Gussignies and Haynecourt use the same arms.)

== See also ==
- Communes of the Nord department
