= Haussy =

- Commune
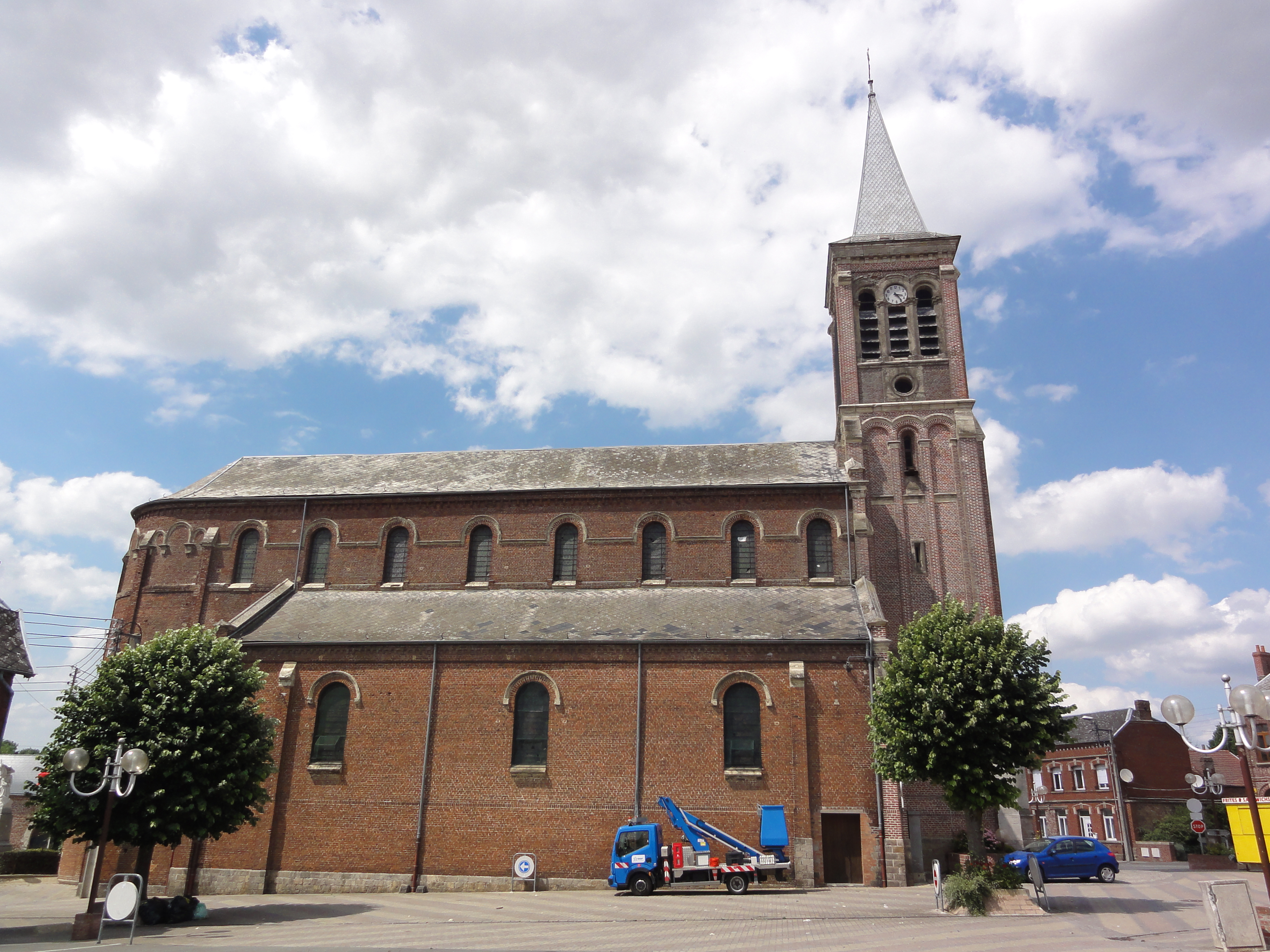
- The church in Haussy

- Coat of arms
- Location of Haussy
- Location within France Location within Hauts-de-France
- Coordinates: 50°13′07″N 3°28′52″E
- Country: France
- Region: Hauts-de-France
- Department: Nord
- Arrondissement: Cambrai
- Canton: Caudry
- Intercommunality: CC Pays Solesmois

Government
  - Mayor (2020–2026): Jean-Marc Boucly
- Area^{1}: 16.22 km^{2} (6.26 sq mi)
- Elevation: 60 m (200 ft)
- Highest elevation: 109 m (358 ft)
- Lowest elevation: 50 m (160 ft)
- Population (2023): 1,451
  - Density: 89.46/km^{2} (231.7/sq mi)
- Time zone: UTC+01:00 (CET)
  - Summer (DST): UTC+02:00 (CEST)
- INSEE/Postal code: 59289 /59294
- ^{1} French Land Register data, which excludes lakes, ponds, glaciers > 1 km^{2} (0.386 sq mi or 247 acres) and river estuaries.

Haussy (French pronunciation: [osi]) is a commune in the Nord department in northern France.

It is 15 km (9.3 mi) south of Valenciennes.

== History ==
During World War I the Germans occupied Haussy. Their brutal treatment of the native French inhabitants is recorded by Private A S Bullock in his memoir, but among his mementoes Bullock also kept a postcard he found on the floor of the village school on 23 October 1918, referring to more peaceful times, including 'Eugenie's first communion'.

== Heraldry ==
Arms of Haussy	The arms of Haussy are blazoned : Or, a lion gules. (Pont-l'Abbé, Escarmain and Haussy (see also Râches) use the same arms.)

== Notable people ==
- Pierre Mauroy (French: [pjɛʁ moʁwa]; 5 July 1928 – 7 June 2013) was a French Socialist politician who was Prime Minister of France from 1981 to 1984 under President François Mitterrand. Mauroy also served as Mayor of Lille from 1973 to 2001. He arrived in Haussy in 1936. He is eight. His father, Henri, is named director of the School for Boys and the family moves in the housing of the school group Louis-Pasteur dating from 1929.

== See also ==
- Communes of the Nord department
