= Floursies =

- Commune
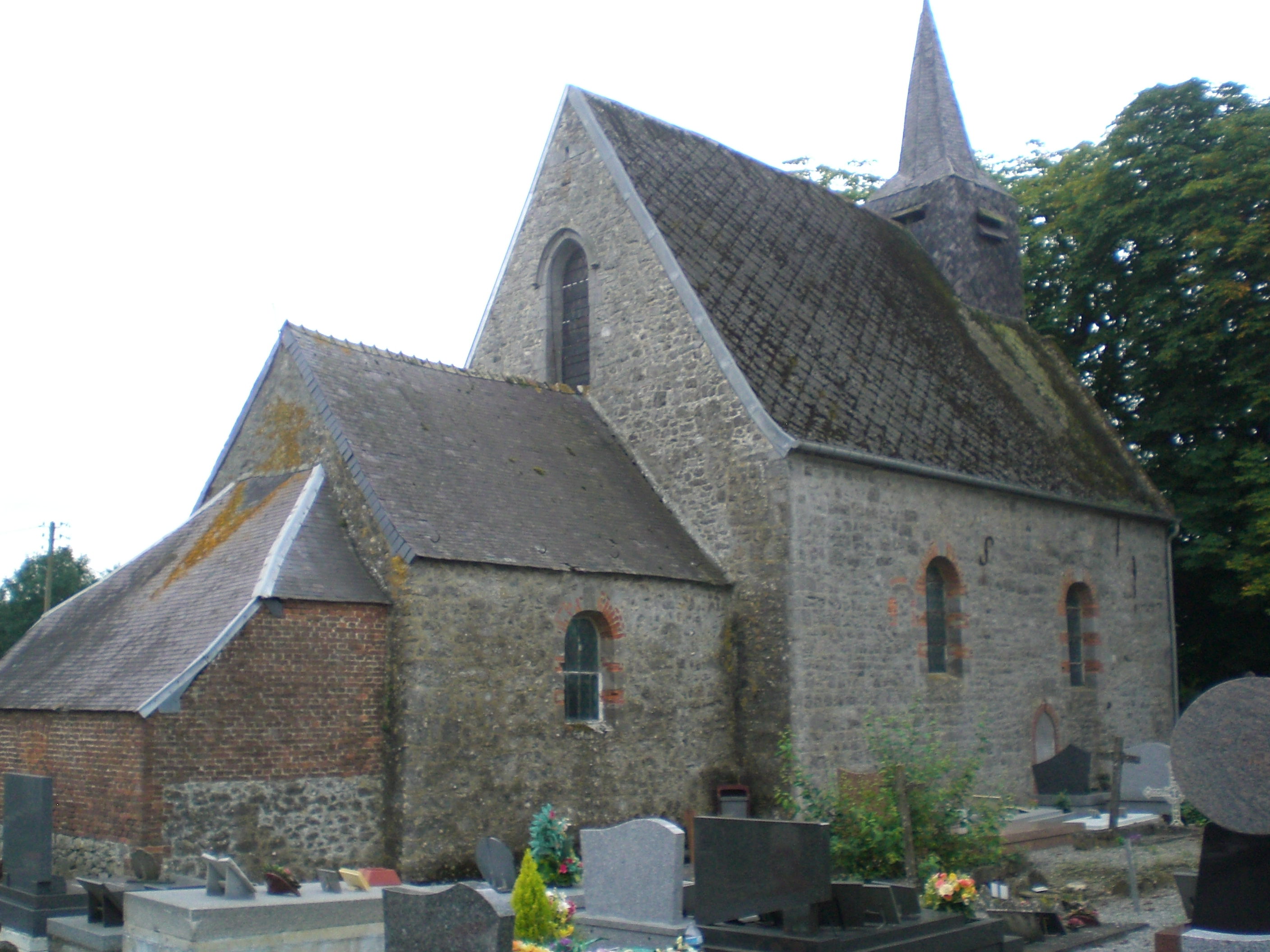
- The church in Floursies

- Coat of arms
- Location of Floursies
- Location within France Location within Hauts-de-France
- Coordinates: 50°10′56″N 3°58′10″E
- Country: France
- Region: Hauts-de-France
- Department: Nord
- Arrondissement: Avesnes-sur-Helpe
- Canton: Avesnes-sur-Helpe
- Intercommunality: Cœur de l'Avesnois

Government
  - Mayor (2020–2026): Alain Deltour
- Area^{1}: 4.65 km^{2} (1.80 sq mi)
- Elevation: 120 m (390 ft)
- Highest elevation: 208 m (682 ft)
- Lowest elevation: 177 m (581 ft)
- Population (2023): 131
  - Density: 28.2/km^{2} (73.0/sq mi)
- Time zone: UTC+01:00 (CET)
  - Summer (DST): UTC+02:00 (CEST)
- INSEE/Postal code: 59240 /59440
- ^{1} French Land Register data, which excludes lakes, ponds, glaciers > 1 km^{2} (0.386 sq mi or 247 acres) and river estuaries.

Floursies (French pronunciation: [fluʁsi]) is a commune in the Nord department in northern France.

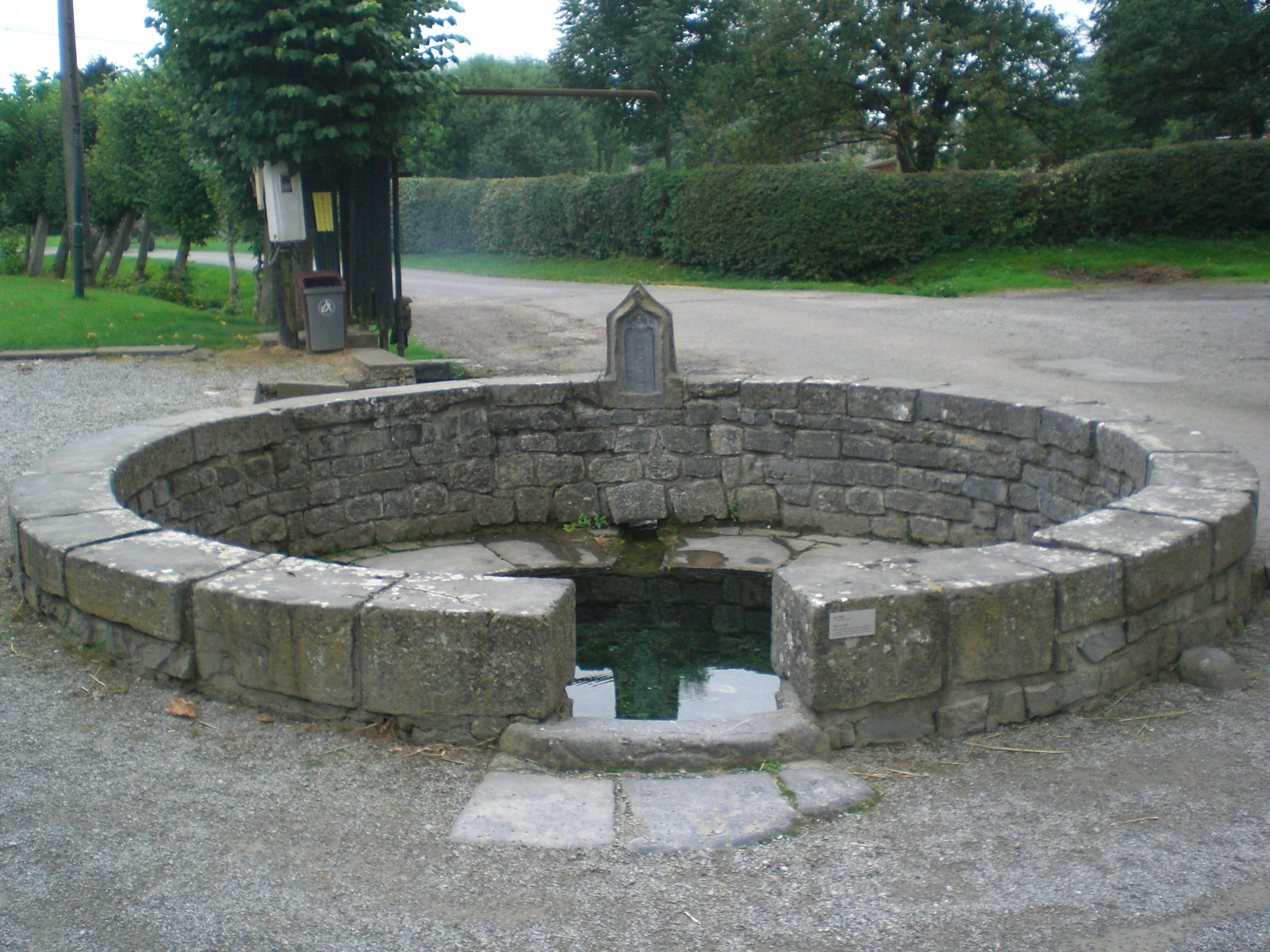
St. Eloi Fountain

== Heraldry ==
Arms of Floursies	The arms of Floursies are blazoned : Azure, 3 keys Or. (Floursies, Hargnies and Raismes use the same arms.)

== See also ==
- Communes of the Nord department
