= Ghissignies =

- Commune
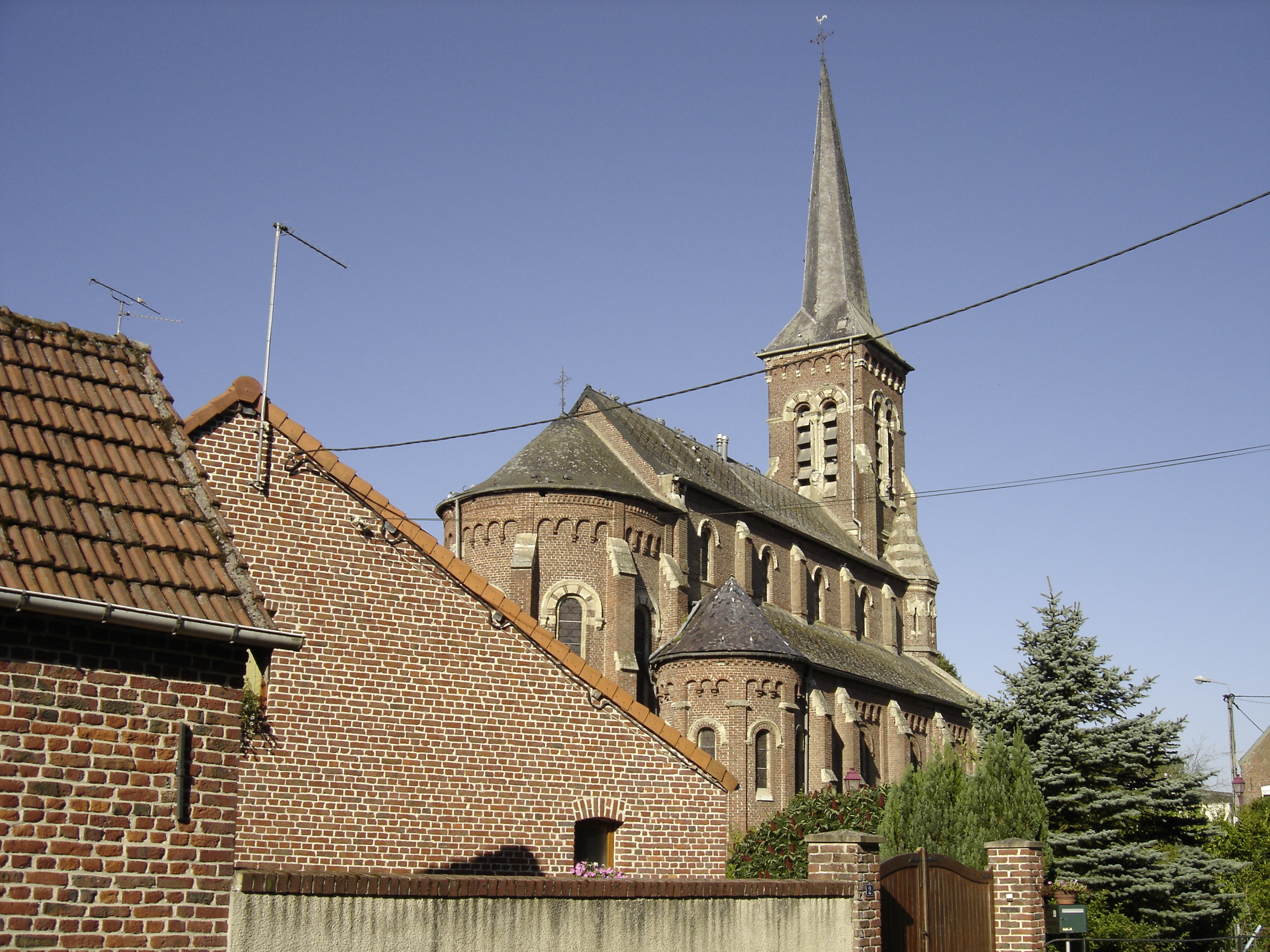
- The church in Ghissignies

- Coat of arms
- Location of Ghissignies
- Location within France Location within Hauts-de-France
- Coordinates: 50°13′38″N 3°37′04″E
- Country: France
- Region: Hauts-de-France
- Department: Nord
- Arrondissement: Avesnes-sur-Helpe
- Canton: Avesnes-sur-Helpe
- Intercommunality: Pays de Mormal

Government
  - Mayor (2020–2026): Pierre Deudon
- Area^{1}: 4.52 km^{2} (1.75 sq mi)
- Elevation: 116 m (381 ft)
- Highest elevation: 134 m (440 ft)
- Lowest elevation: 82 m (269 ft)
- Population (2023): 505
  - Density: 112/km^{2} (289/sq mi)
- Time zone: UTC+01:00 (CET)
  - Summer (DST): UTC+02:00 (CEST)
- INSEE/Postal code: 59259 /59530
- ^{1} French Land Register data, which excludes lakes, ponds, glaciers > 1 km^{2} (0.386 sq mi or 247 acres) and river estuaries.

Ghissignies (French pronunciation: [ɡisiɲi]) is a commune in the Nord department in northern France.

== Heraldry ==
| Arms of Ghissignies | The arms of Ghissignies are blazoned : Azure, semy de lys Or dimidiated with Vert, a fess argent. (Ghissignies and Haspres use the same arms.) |

== See also ==
- Communes of the Nord department
