= Houplines =

- Commune
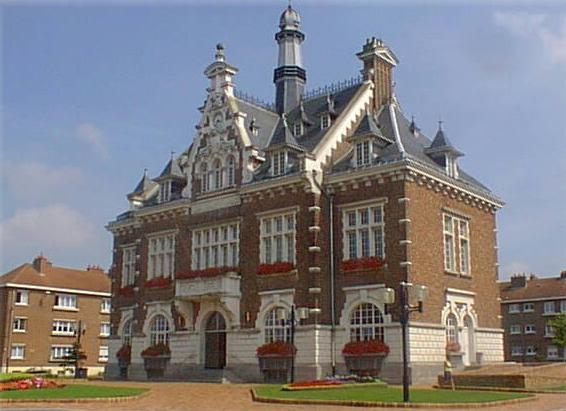
- The town hall in Houplines

- Coat of arms
- Location of Houplines
- Location within France Location within Hauts-de-France
- Coordinates: 50°41′29″N 2°54′37″E
- Country: France
- Region: Hauts-de-France
- Department: Nord
- Arrondissement: Lille
- Canton: Armentières
- Intercommunality: Métropole Européenne de Lille

Government
  - Mayor (2020–2026): Jean-François Legrand
- Area^{1}: 11.32 km^{2} (4.37 sq mi)
- Elevation: 14 m (46 ft)
- Highest elevation: 20 m (66 ft)
- Lowest elevation: 12 m (39 ft)
- Population (2023): 7,921
  - Density: 699.7/km^{2} (1,812/sq mi)
- Time zone: UTC+01:00 (CET)
  - Summer (DST): UTC+02:00 (CEST)
- INSEE/Postal code: 59317 /59116
- ^{1} French Land Register data, which excludes lakes, ponds, glaciers > 1 km^{2} (0.386 sq mi or 247 acres) and river estuaries.

Houplines (French pronunciation: [uplin]; Dutch: Opline) is a commune in the Nord department in northern France. It is part of the Métropole Européenne de Lille.

Adjoining the communal (village) cemetery is the Houplines Communal Cemetery Extension, a Commonwealth War Graves Commission maintained cemetery containing the graves of 466 identified casualties, 465 of them Commonwealth servicemen who died in the area around the village during the First World War.

Houplines maintains a partnership arrangement with the German community of Kirchhundem.

== Population ==
Historical population
Year	Pop.	±% p.a.
1968	6,398	—
1975	7,403	+2.11%
1982	7,924	+0.98%
1990	7,609	−0.51%
1999	7,907	+0.43%
2007	7,570	−0.54%
2012	7,791	+0.58%
2017	7,805	+0.04%
2023	7,921	+0.25%
Source: INSEE

== Heraldry ==
Arms of Houplines	The arms of Houplines are blazoned : Sable, a chief argent. (Ennetières-en-Weppes, Houplines and Sailly-lez-Lannoy use the same arms.)

== See also ==
- Communes of the Nord department
