= Hargnies, Nord =

Hargnies
- Commune
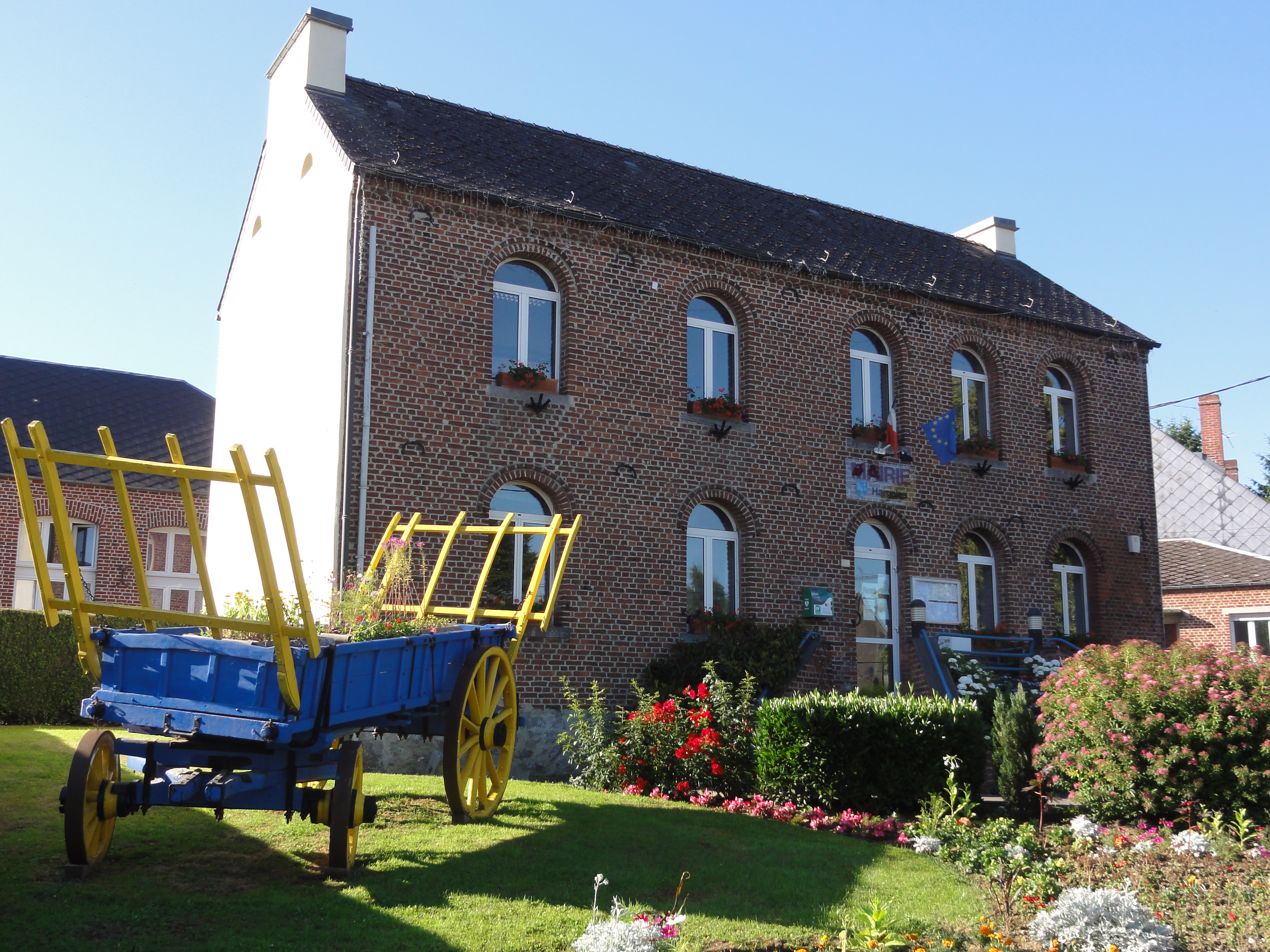
- The town hall in Hargnies

- Coat of arms
- Location of Hargnies
- Location within France Location within Hauts-de-France
- Coordinates: 50°15′28″N 3°50′55″E
- Country: France
- Region: Hauts-de-France
- Department: Nord
- Arrondissement: Avesnes-sur-Helpe
- Canton: Aulnoye-Aymeries
- Intercommunality: CC Pays de Mormal

Government
  - Mayor (2020–2026): Alain Gerard
- Area^{1}: 5.14 km^{2} (1.98 sq mi)
- Elevation: 146 m (479 ft)
- Highest elevation: 162 m (531 ft)
- Lowest elevation: 137 m (449 ft)
- Population (2023): 599
  - Density: 117/km^{2} (302/sq mi)
- Time zone: UTC+01:00 (CET)
  - Summer (DST): UTC+02:00 (CEST)
- INSEE/Postal code: 59283 /59138
- ^{1} French Land Register data, which excludes lakes, ponds, glaciers > 1 km^{2} (0.386 sq mi or 247 acres) and river estuaries.

Hargnies (French pronunciation: [aʁɲi]) is a commune in the Nord department in northern France.

== Climate ==
In 2010, the commune's climate was classified as "semi-continental or mountain margin climate", according to the typology of climates in France, which at the time included eight major types of climate in mainland France. In 2020, the municipality was classified as having a "semi-continental climate" in the classification established by Météo-France, which now has only five main types of climate in mainland France. For this type of climate, the summers are hot and the winters harsh, with a large number of days of snow or frost. Annual rainfall is relatively high.

== Heraldry ==
Arms of Hargnies	The arms of Hargnies are blazoned: Azure, 3 keys Or. (Floursies, Hargnies and Raismes use the same arms.)

== See also ==
- Communes of the Nord department
