= Séranvillers-Forenville =

- Commune
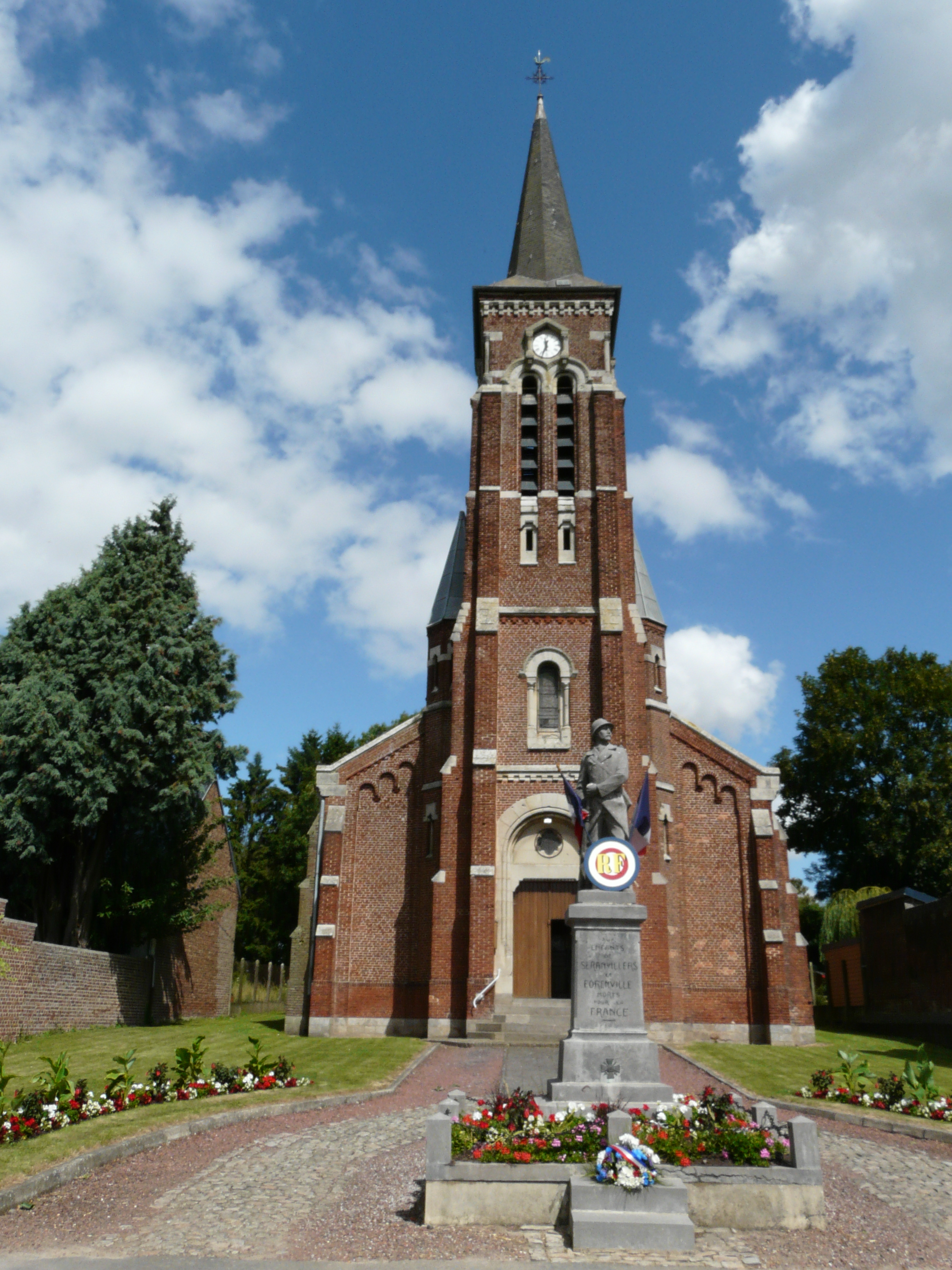
- The church in Séranvillers-Forenville

- Coat of arms
- Location of Séranvillers-Forenville
- Location within France Location within Hauts-de-France
- Coordinates: 50°07′26″N 3°16′52″E
- Country: France
- Region: Hauts-de-France
- Department: Nord
- Arrondissement: Cambrai
- Canton: Le Cateau-Cambrésis
- Intercommunality: CA Cambrai

Government
  - Mayor (2020–2026): Marie-Bernadette Buisset-Lavalard
- Area^{1}: 7.24 km^{2} (2.80 sq mi)
- Elevation: 102 m (335 ft)
- Highest elevation: 114 m (374 ft)
- Lowest elevation: 78 m (256 ft)
- Population (2023): 416
  - Density: 57.5/km^{2} (149/sq mi)
- Time zone: UTC+01:00 (CET)
  - Summer (DST): UTC+02:00 (CEST)
- INSEE/Postal code: 59567 /59400
- ^{1} French Land Register data, which excludes lakes, ponds, glaciers > 1 km^{2} (0.386 sq mi or 247 acres) and river estuaries.

Séranvillers-Forenville is a commune in the Nord department in northern France.

== See also ==
- Communes of the Nord department
