= Malplaquet =

Malplaquet is the name of two places in Belgium and a place in France:

- Malplaquet, Liège at 50°39′N 5°22′E
- Malplaquet, Hainaut at 50°26′N 4°0′E
- Malplaquet (France) in which the Battle of Malplaquet was fought
- The Battle of Malplaquet (11 September 1709) between the French and the Allies, the largest 18th-century European battle
- Malplaquet Palace, a fictional estate in Northamptonshire, England, in the 1946 novel Mistress Masham's Repose
