= Houdain-lez-Bavay =

- Commune
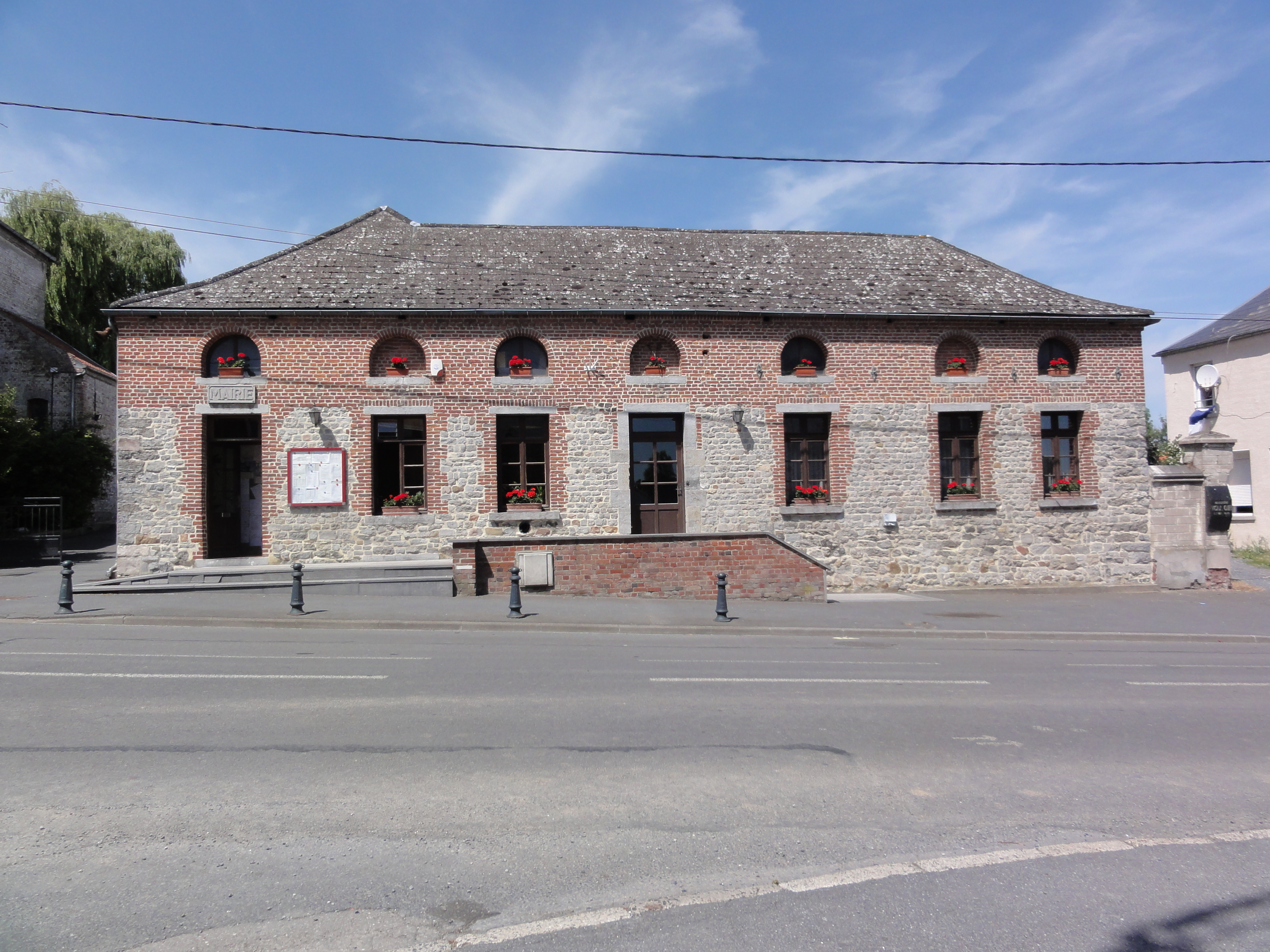
- The town hall in Houdain-lez-Bavay

- Coat of arms
- Location of Houdain-lez-Bavay
- Location within France Location within Hauts-de-France
- Coordinates: 50°18′54″N 3°47′07″E
- Country: France
- Region: Hauts-de-France
- Department: Nord
- Arrondissement: Avesnes-sur-Helpe
- Canton: Aulnoye-Aymeries
- Intercommunality: Pays de Mormal

Government
  - Mayor (2020–2026): Nicolas Ruter
- Area^{1}: 12.18 km^{2} (4.70 sq mi)
- Elevation: 136 m (446 ft)
- Highest elevation: 147 m (482 ft)
- Lowest elevation: 94 m (308 ft)
- Population (2023): 902
  - Density: 74.1/km^{2} (192/sq mi)
- Time zone: UTC+01:00 (CET)
  - Summer (DST): UTC+02:00 (CEST)
- INSEE/Postal code: 59315 /59570
- ^{1} French Land Register data, which excludes lakes, ponds, glaciers > 1 km^{2} (0.386 sq mi or 247 acres) and river estuaries.

Houdain-lez-Bavay (French pronunciation: [udɛ̃ le bavɛ], literally Houdain near Bavay) is a commune in the Nord department in northern France.

== Heraldry ==
Arms of Houdain-lez-Bavay	The arms of Houdain-lez-Bavay are blazoned : Or, a chief bendy gules and argent.

== See also ==
- Communes of the Nord department
