= Vieux-Mesnil =

- Commune
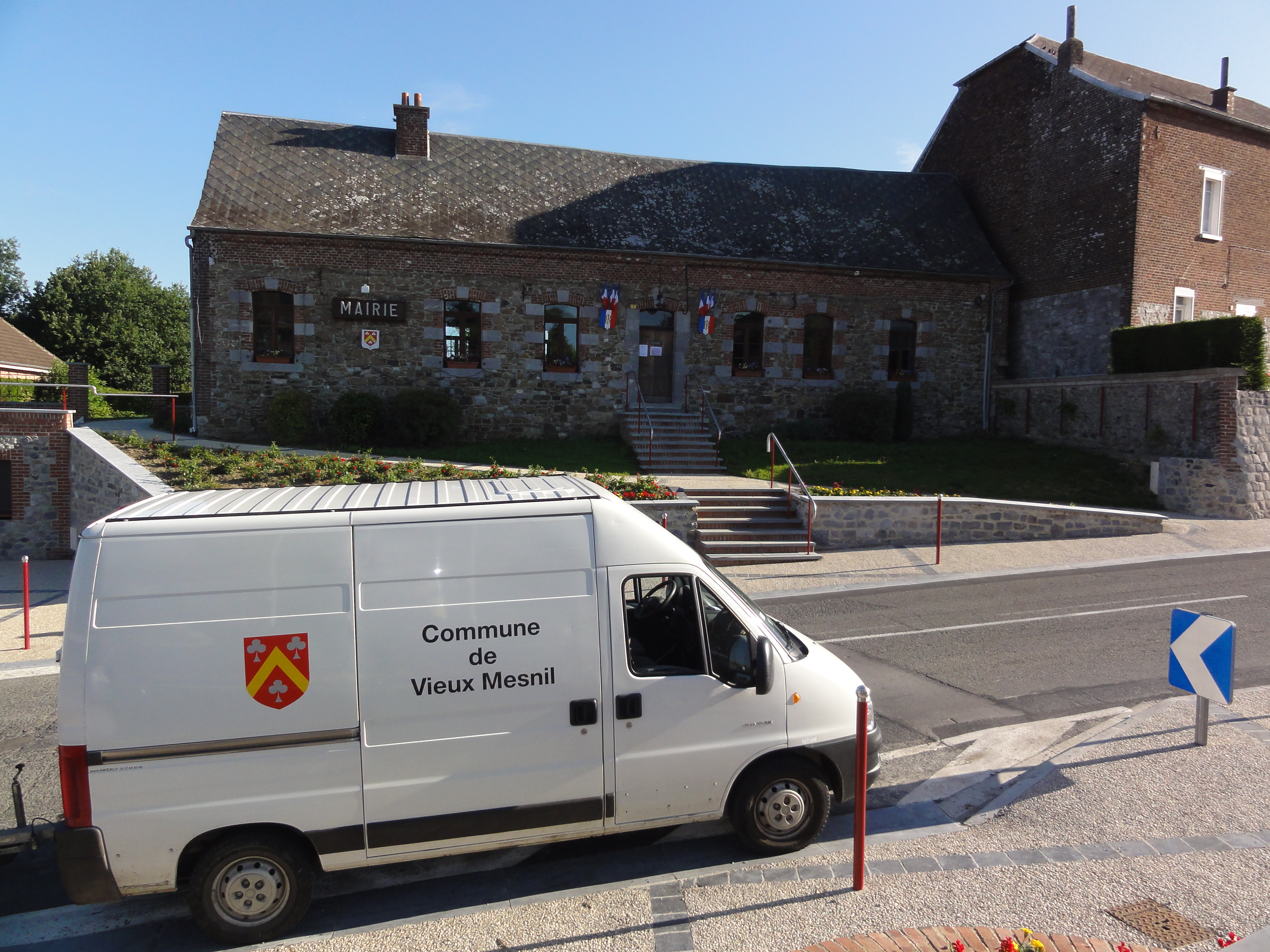
- The town hall in Vieux-Mesnil

- Coat of arms
- Location of Vieux-Mesnil
- Location within France Location within Hauts-de-France
- Coordinates: 50°15′18″N 3°51′54″E
- Country: France
- Region: Hauts-de-France
- Department: Nord
- Arrondissement: Avesnes-sur-Helpe
- Canton: Aulnoye-Aymeries
- Intercommunality: CA Maubeuge Val de Sambre

Government
  - Mayor (2023–2026): Alain Lienard
- Area^{1}: 5.95 km^{2} (2.30 sq mi)
- Elevation: 156 m (512 ft)
- Highest elevation: 162 m (531 ft)
- Lowest elevation: 131 m (430 ft)
- Population (2023): 641
  - Density: 108/km^{2} (279/sq mi)
- Time zone: UTC+01:00 (CET)
  - Summer (DST): UTC+02:00 (CEST)
- INSEE/Postal code: 59617 /59138
- ^{1} French Land Register data, which excludes lakes, ponds, glaciers > 1 km^{2} (0.386 sq mi or 247 acres) and river estuaries.

Vieux-Mesnil (French pronunciation: [vjø menil]) is a commune in the Nord department in northern France. It is located 7 km southeast from the town of Bavay and 8 km southwest from Maubeuge.

== Heraldry ==
| Arms of Vieux-Mesnil | The arms of Vieux-Mesnil are blazoned : Gules, a chevron Or between 3 trefoils argent. (Bachant and Vieux-Mesnil use the same arms.) |

== See also ==
- Communes of the Nord department
