= Leval, Nord =

Leval
- Commune
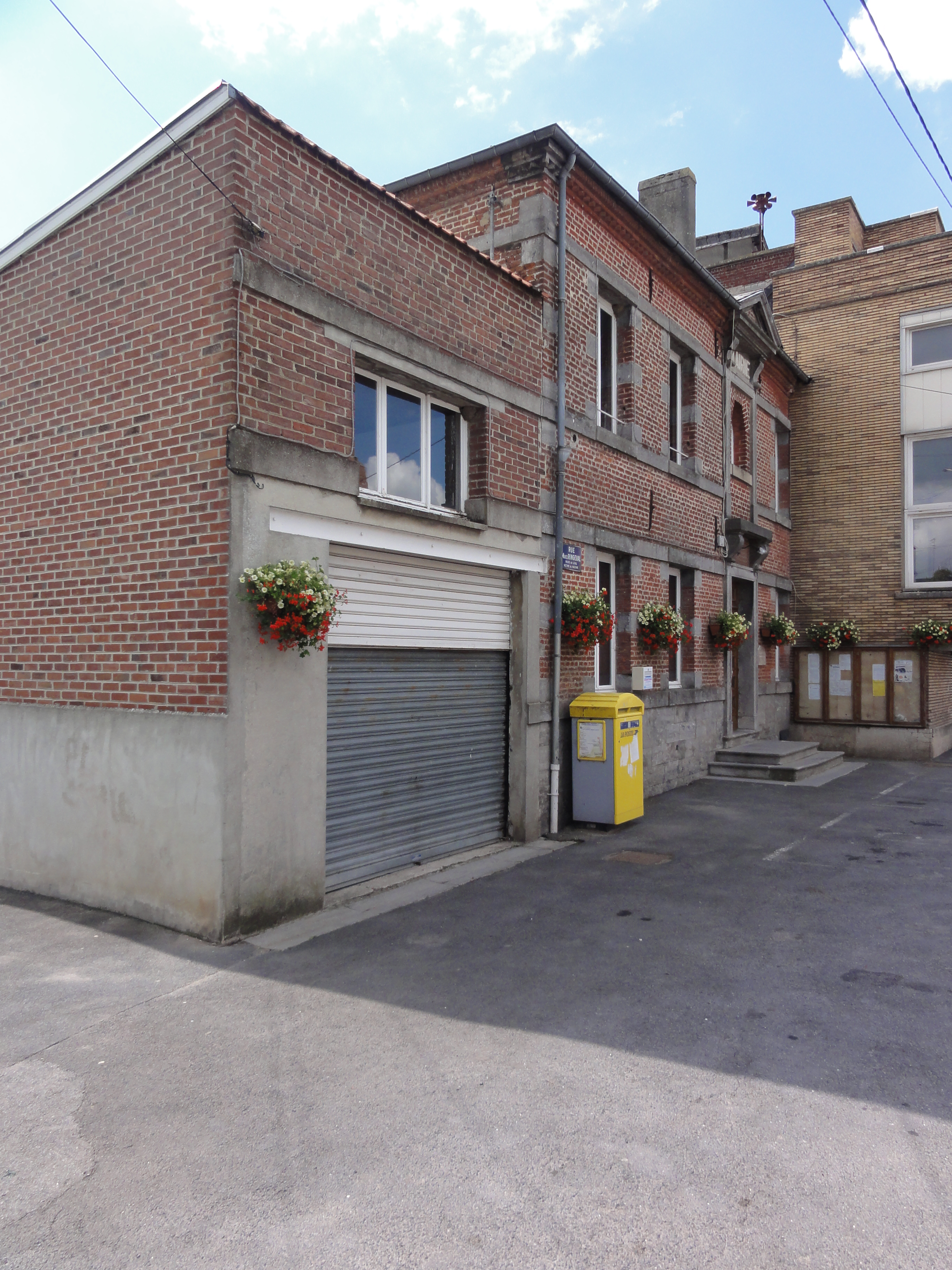
- The town hall in Leval

- Coat of arms
- Location of Leval
- Location within France Location within Hauts-de-France
- Coordinates: 50°10′49″N 3°49′50″E
- Country: France
- Region: Hauts-de-France
- Department: Nord
- Arrondissement: Avesnes-sur-Helpe
- Canton: Aulnoye-Aymeries
- Intercommunality: CA Maubeuge Val de Sambre

Government
  - Mayor (2020–2026): Jacques Thurette
- Area^{1}: 5.89 km^{2} (2.27 sq mi)
- Elevation: 114 m (374 ft)
- Highest elevation: 163 m (535 ft)
- Lowest elevation: 128 m (420 ft)
- Population (2023): 2,474
  - Density: 420/km^{2} (1,090/sq mi)
- Time zone: UTC+01:00 (CET)
  - Summer (DST): UTC+02:00 (CEST)
- INSEE/Postal code: 59344 /59620
- ^{1} French Land Register data, which excludes lakes, ponds, glaciers > 1 km^{2} (0.386 sq mi or 247 acres) and river estuaries.

Leval (French pronunciation: [ləval]) is a commune in the Nord department in northern France.

== Population ==
Historical population
Year	Pop.	±% p.a.
1968	1,916	—
1975	2,401	+3.28%
1982	2,598	+1.13%
1990	2,591	−0.03%
1999	2,393	−0.88%
2007	2,246	−0.79%
2012	2,433	+1.61%
2017	2,455	+0.18%
2023	2,474	+0.13%
Source: INSEE

== Heraldry ==
Arms of Leval	The arms of Leval are blazoned : Checky argent and azure, an inescutcheon gules.

== See also ==
- Communes of the Nord department
