= Bry, Nord =

Bry
- Commune
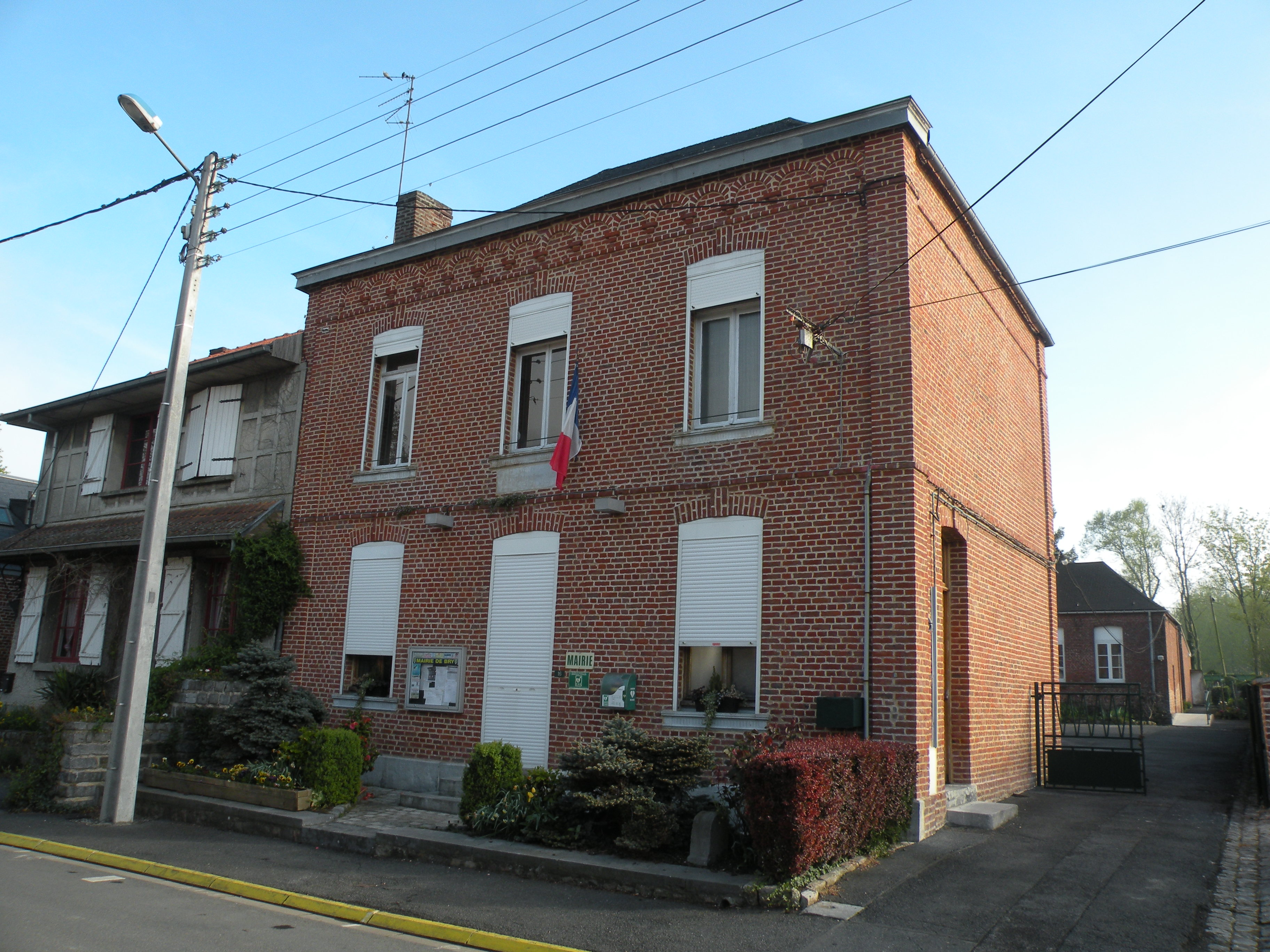
- The town hall in Bry

- Coat of arms
- Location of Bry
- Location within France Location within Hauts-de-France
- Coordinates: 50°19′08″N 3°40′49″E
- Country: France
- Region: Hauts-de-France
- Department: Nord
- Arrondissement: Avesnes-sur-Helpe
- Canton: Aulnoye-Aymeries
- Intercommunality: CC Pays de Mormal

Government
  - Mayor (2020–2026): Bertrand Flament
- Area^{1}: 2.88 km^{2} (1.11 sq mi)
- Elevation: 106 m (348 ft)
- Highest elevation: 116 m (381 ft)
- Lowest elevation: 80 m (260 ft)
- Population (2023): 390
  - Density: 140/km^{2} (350/sq mi)
- Time zone: UTC+01:00 (CET)
  - Summer (DST): UTC+02:00 (CEST)
- INSEE/Postal code: 59116 /59144
- ^{1} French Land Register data, which excludes lakes, ponds, glaciers > 1 km^{2} (0.386 sq mi or 247 acres) and river estuaries.

Bry (French pronunciation: [bʁi]) is a commune in the Nord department in northern France.

== Population ==
Historical population
Year	Pop.	±% p.a.
1968	275	—
1975	233	−2.34%
1982	272	+2.24%
1990	312	+1.73%
1999	349	+1.25%
2007	367	+0.63%
2012	401	+1.79%
2017	417	+0.79%
2023	390	−1.11%
Source: INSEE

== Heraldry ==
Arms of Bry	The arms of Bry are blazoned : Or, a bunch of grapes azure, slipped and leaved vert.

== See also ==
- Communes of the Nord department
