= Bachant =

- Commune
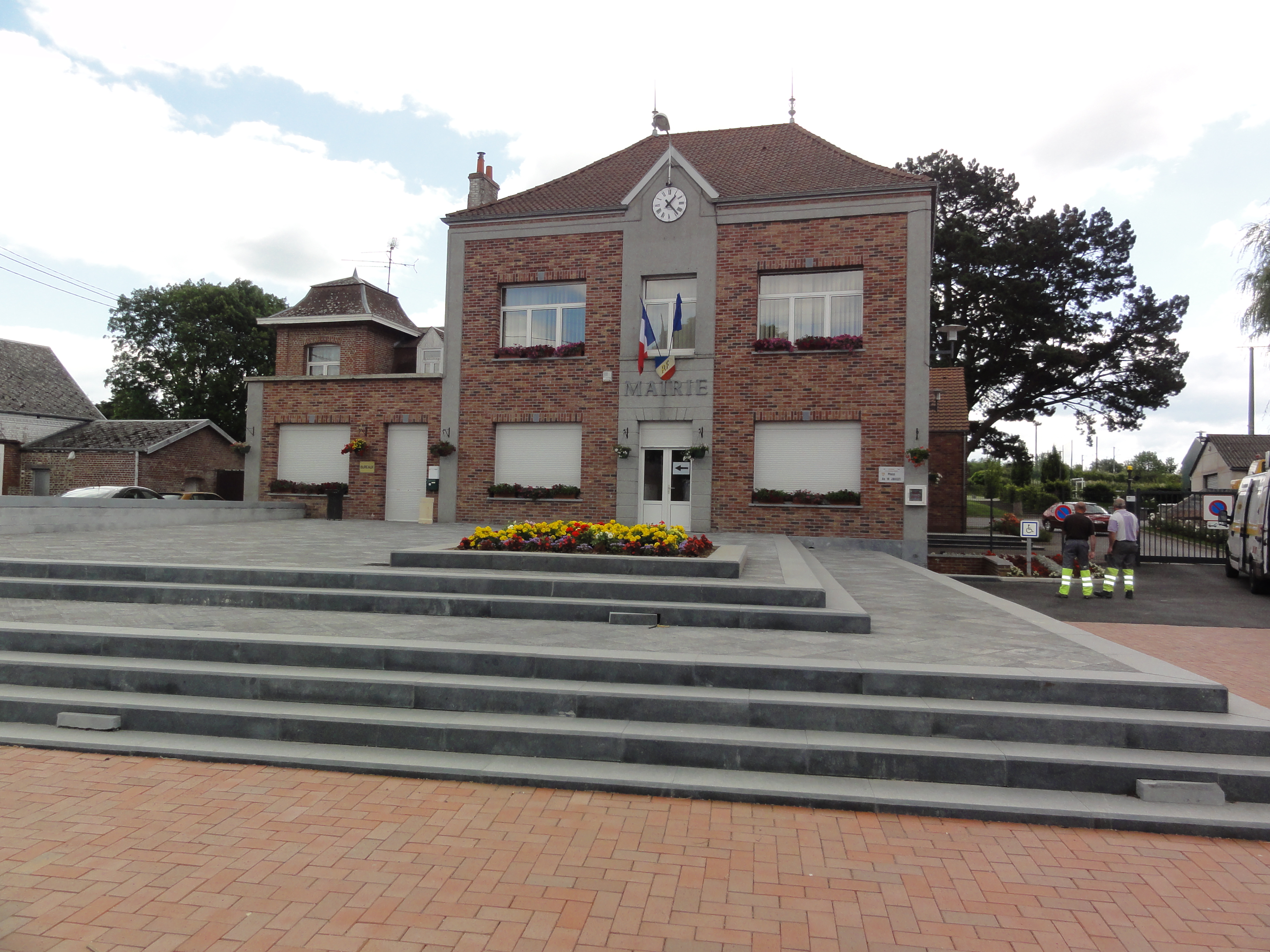
- Town hall

- Coat of arms
- Location of Bachant
- Location within France Location within Hauts-de-France
- Coordinates: 50°12′55″N 3°51′55″E
- Country: France
- Region: Hauts-de-France
- Department: Nord
- Arrondissement: Avesnes-sur-Helpe
- Canton: Aulnoye-Aymeries
- Intercommunality: Maubeuge Val de Sambre

Government
  - Mayor (2020–2026): David Zélani
- Area^{1}: 9.37 km^{2} (3.62 sq mi)
- Elevation: 142 m (466 ft)
- Highest elevation: 169 m (554 ft)
- Lowest elevation: 127 m (417 ft)
- Population (2023): 2,230
  - Density: 238/km^{2} (616/sq mi)
- Time zone: UTC+01:00 (CET)
  - Summer (DST): UTC+02:00 (CEST)
- INSEE/Postal code: 59041 /59138
- ^{1} French Land Register data, which excludes lakes, ponds, glaciers > 1 km^{2} (0.386 sq mi or 247 acres) and river estuaries.

Bachant (French pronunciation: [baʃɑ̃]) is a commune in the Nord department in northern France.

== Population ==
Historical population
Year	Pop.	±% p.a.
1968	2,750	—
1975	2,692	−0.30%
1982	2,534	−0.86%
1990	2,498	−0.18%
1999	2,368	−0.59%
2007	2,387	+0.10%
2012	2,392	+0.04%
2017	2,324	−0.58%
2023	2,230	−0.69%
Source: INSEE

== Heraldry ==
Arms of Bachant	The arms of Bachant are blazoned : Gules, a chevron Or between 3 trefoils argent. (Bachant and Vieux-Mesnil use the same arms.)

== See also ==
- Communes of the Nord department
