= Preux-au-Sart =

- Commune
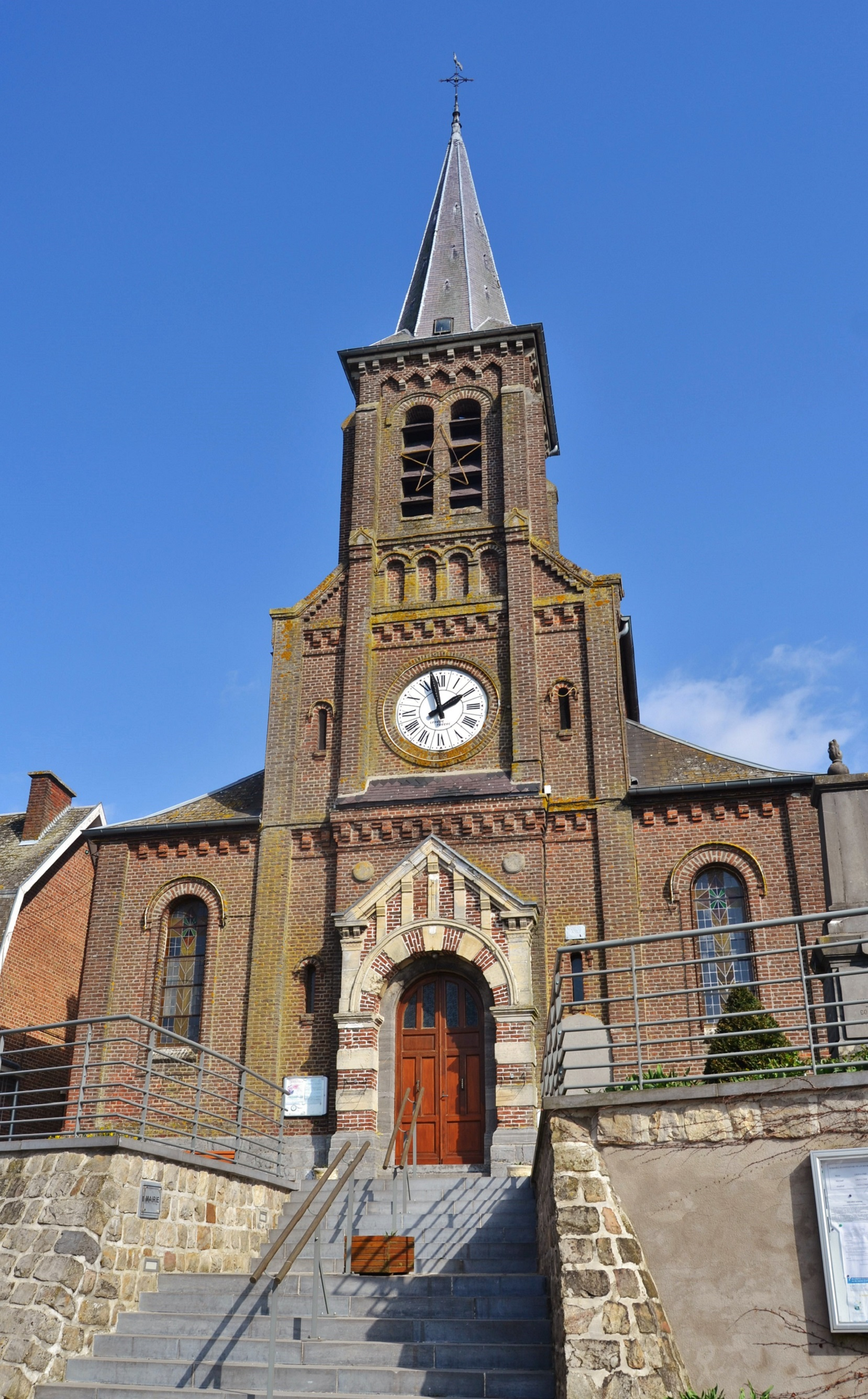
- The church in Preux-au-Sart

- Coat of arms
- Location of Preux-au-Sart
- Location within France Location within Hauts-de-France
- Coordinates: 50°17′03″N 3°41′17″E
- Country: France
- Region: Hauts-de-France
- Department: Nord
- Arrondissement: Avesnes-sur-Helpe
- Canton: Aulnoye-Aymeries
- Intercommunality: CC Pays de Mormal

Government
  - Mayor (2020–2026): Jean-Baptiste Guiot
- Area^{1}: 5.09 km^{2} (1.97 sq mi)
- Highest elevation: 139 m (456 ft)
- Lowest elevation: 80 m (260 ft)
- Population (2023): 300
  - Density: 59/km^{2} (150/sq mi)
- Time zone: UTC+01:00 (CET)
  - Summer (DST): UTC+02:00 (CEST)
- INSEE/Postal code: 59473 /59144
- ^{1} French Land Register data, which excludes lakes, ponds, glaciers > 1 km^{2} (0.386 sq mi or 247 acres) and river estuaries.

Preux-au-Sart (French pronunciation: [pʁø o saʁ]) is a commune in the Nord department in northern France.

== Heraldry ==
Arms of Preux-au-Sart	In French; Les armes de Preux-au-Sart se blasonnent ainsi : De gueules à cinq fusées d'argent accolées en fasce et touchant les flancs de l'écu Which translates in English to The arms of Preux-au-Sart are blazoned Just so: "Gules with five silver rockets in Fess on the flanks of the shield.

== See also ==
- Communes of the Nord department
