= Sassegnies =

- Commune
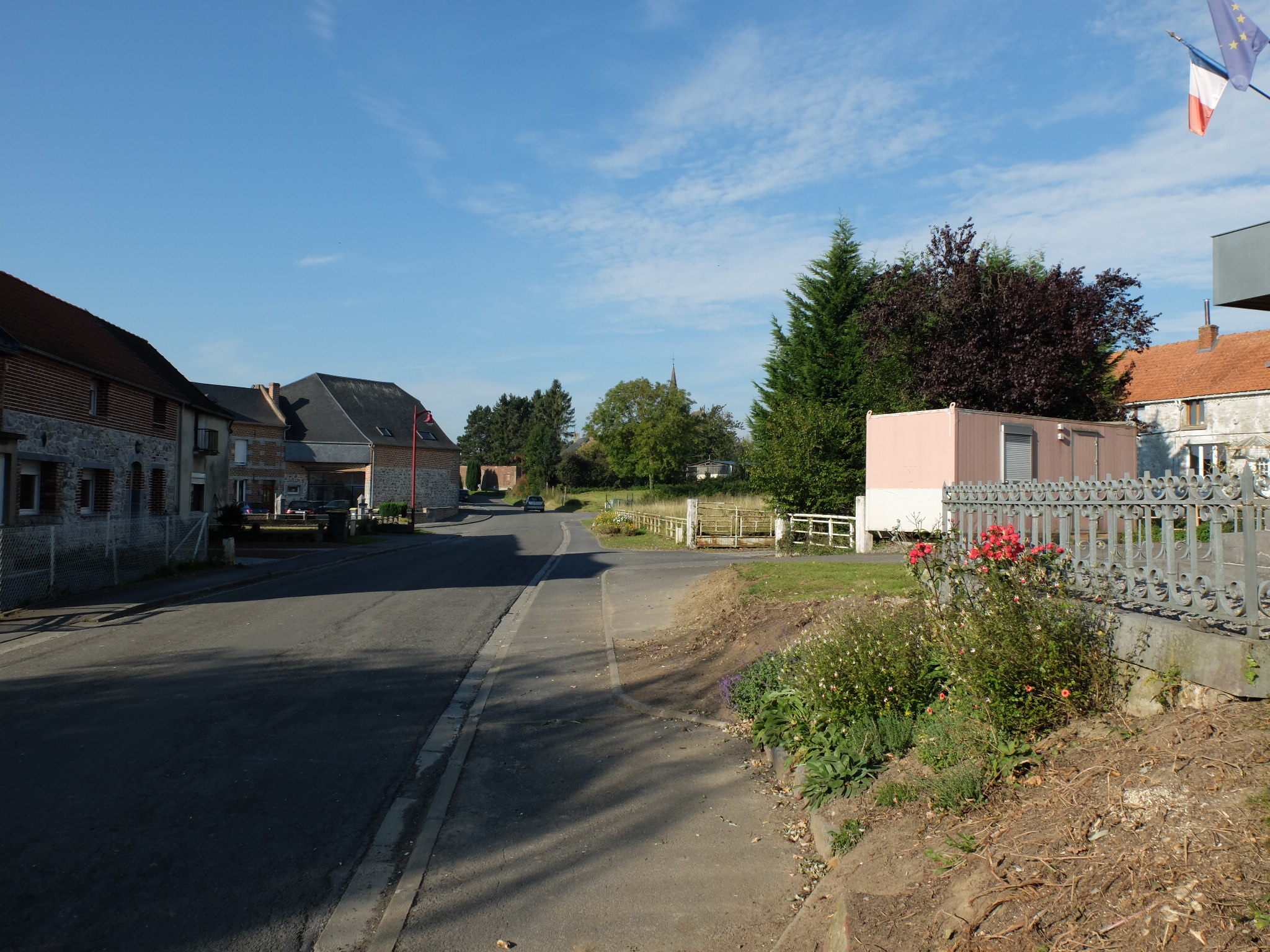
- A view within Sassegnies

- Coat of arms
- Location of Sassegnies
- Location within France Location within Hauts-de-France
- Coordinates: 50°10′47″N 3°48′21″E
- Country: France
- Region: Hauts-de-France
- Department: Nord
- Arrondissement: Avesnes-sur-Helpe
- Canton: Aulnoye-Aymeries
- Intercommunality: CA Maubeuge Val de Sambre

Government
  - Mayor (2020–2026): Vincent Petit
- Area^{1}: 4.15 km^{2} (1.60 sq mi)
- Elevation: 140 m (460 ft)
- Highest elevation: 164 m (538 ft)
- Lowest elevation: 127 m (417 ft)
- Population (2023): 260
  - Density: 63/km^{2} (160/sq mi)
- Time zone: UTC+01:00 (CET)
  - Summer (DST): UTC+02:00 (CEST)
- INSEE/Postal code: 59556 /59145
- ^{1} French Land Register data, which excludes lakes, ponds, glaciers > 1 km^{2} (0.386 sq mi or 247 acres) and river estuaries.

Sassegnies (French pronunciation: [sasɲi]) is a commune in the Nord department in northern France.

== Heraldry ==
Arms of Sassegnies	The arms of Sassegnies are blazoned : Quarterly 1&4: Azure, an escarbuncle fleury Or; 2&3: Azure, 3 bends Or; on a chief gules a cross argent.

== See also ==
- Communes of the Nord department
