= Moustier-en-Fagne =

- Commune
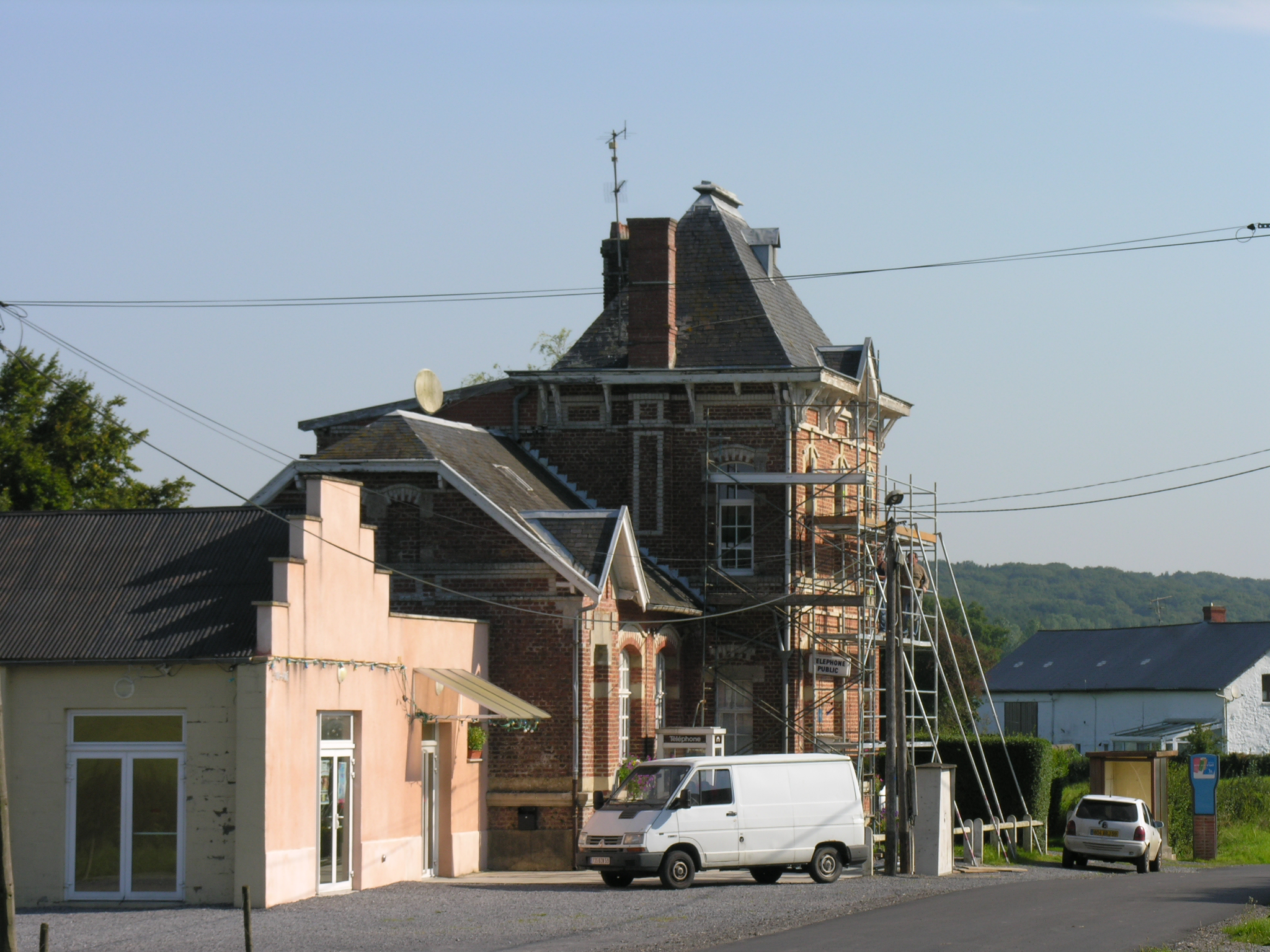
- The town hall in Moustier-en-Fagne

- Coat of arms
- Location of Moustier-en-Fagne
- Location within France Location within Hauts-de-France
- Coordinates: 50°05′41″N 4°11′42″E
- Country: France
- Region: Hauts-de-France
- Department: Nord
- Arrondissement: Avesnes-sur-Helpe
- Canton: Fourmies
- Intercommunality: Sud Avesnois

Government
  - Mayor (2020–2026): Jean-Michel Hancart
- Area^{1}: 7.13 km^{2} (2.75 sq mi)
- Elevation: 210 m (690 ft)
- Highest elevation: 222 m (728 ft)
- Lowest elevation: 177 m (581 ft)
- Population (2023): 61
  - Density: 8.6/km^{2} (22/sq mi)
- Time zone: UTC+01:00 (CET)
  - Summer (DST): UTC+02:00 (CEST)
- INSEE/Postal code: 59420 /59132
- ^{1} French Land Register data, which excludes lakes, ponds, glaciers > 1 km^{2} (0.386 sq mi or 247 acres) and river estuaries.

Moustier-en-Fagne (French pronunciation: [mustje ɑ̃ faɲ]) is a commune in the Nord department in northern France.

== Heraldry ==
Arms of Moustier-en-Fagne	The arms of Moustier-en-Fagne are blazoned : Gules, 2 keys in saltire addorsed Or. (Hon-Hergies, Moustier-en-Fagne and Taisnières-sur-Hon use the same arms.)

== See also ==
- Communes of the Nord department
