= Audignies =

- Commune
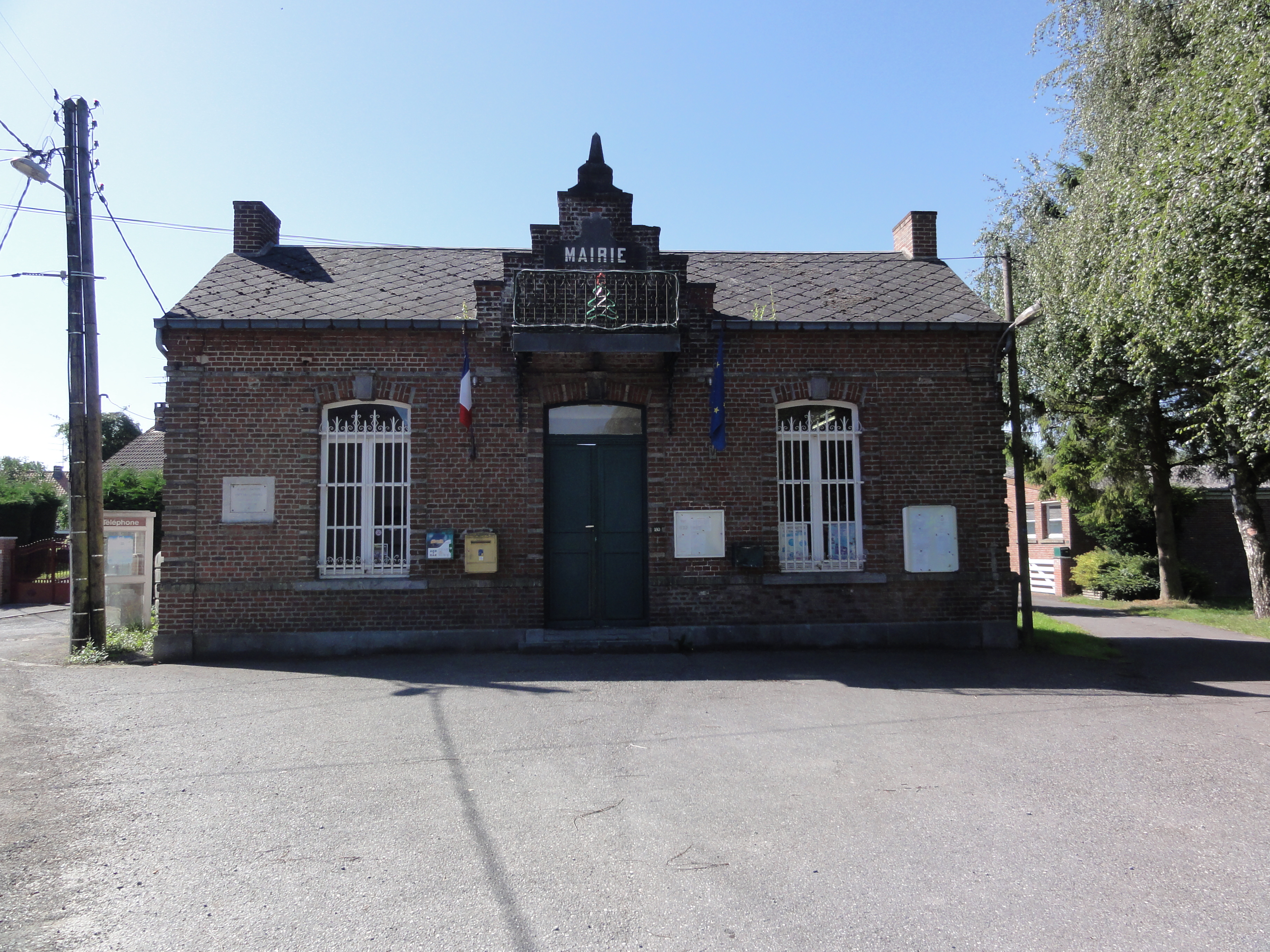
- The town hall in Audignies

- Coat of arms
- Location of Audignies
- Location within France Location within Hauts-de-France
- Coordinates: 50°17′16″N 3°48′46″E
- Country: France
- Region: Hauts-de-France
- Department: Nord
- Arrondissement: Avesnes-sur-Helpe
- Canton: Aulnoye-Aymeries
- Intercommunality: Pays de Mormal

Government
  - Mayor (2022–2026): Henry-Louis Bourgois
- Area^{1}: 3.66 km^{2} (1.41 sq mi)
- Elevation: 137 m (449 ft)
- Highest elevation: 159 m (522 ft)
- Lowest elevation: 129 m (423 ft)
- Population (2023): 359
  - Density: 98.1/km^{2} (254/sq mi)
- Time zone: UTC+01:00 (CET)
  - Summer (DST): UTC+02:00 (CEST)
- INSEE/Postal code: 59031 /59570
- ^{1} French Land Register data, which excludes lakes, ponds, glaciers > 1 km^{2} (0.386 sq mi or 247 acres) and river estuaries.

Audignies (French pronunciation: [odiɲi]) is a commune in the Nord department in northern France.

== Population ==
Historical population
Year	Pop.	±% p.a.
1968	213	—
1975	165	−3.58%
1982	205	+3.15%
1990	233	+1.61%
1999	260	+1.23%
2007	284	+1.11%
2012	306	+1.50%
2017	366	+3.65%
2023	359	−0.32%
Source: INSEE

== Heraldry ==
Arms of Audignies	The arms of Audignies are blazoned : Bendy Or and vert, a canton ermine.

== See also ==
- Communes of the Nord department
