= Canton of Aulnoye-Aymeries =

Coordinates: 50.20°N 3.84°E

The canton of Aulnoye-Aymeries is an administrative division of the Nord department, northern France. It was created at the French canton reorganisation which came into effect in March 2015. Its seat is in Aulnoye-Aymeries.

It consists of the following communes:

1. Audignies
2. Aulnoye-Aymeries
3. Bachant
4. Bavay
5. Bellignies
6. Berlaimont
7. Bettrechies
8. Boussières-sur-Sambre
9. Bry
10. Écuélin
11. Eth
12. Feignies
13. La Flamengrie
14. Frasnoy
15. Gommegnies
16. Gussignies
17. Hargnies
18. Hon-Hergies
19. Houdain-lez-Bavay
20. Jenlain
21. Leval
22. La Longueville
23. Mecquignies
24. Monceau-Saint-Waast
25. Neuf-Mesnil
26. Noyelles-sur-Sambre
27. Obies
28. L'Orée de Mormal
29. Pont-sur-Sambre
30. Preux-au-Sart
31. Saint-Remy-Chaussée
32. Saint-Waast
33. Sassegnies
34. Taisnières-sur-Hon
35. Vieux-Mesnil
36. Villereau
37. Wargnies-le-Grand
38. Wargnies-le-Petit
