= Hon-Hergies =

- Commune
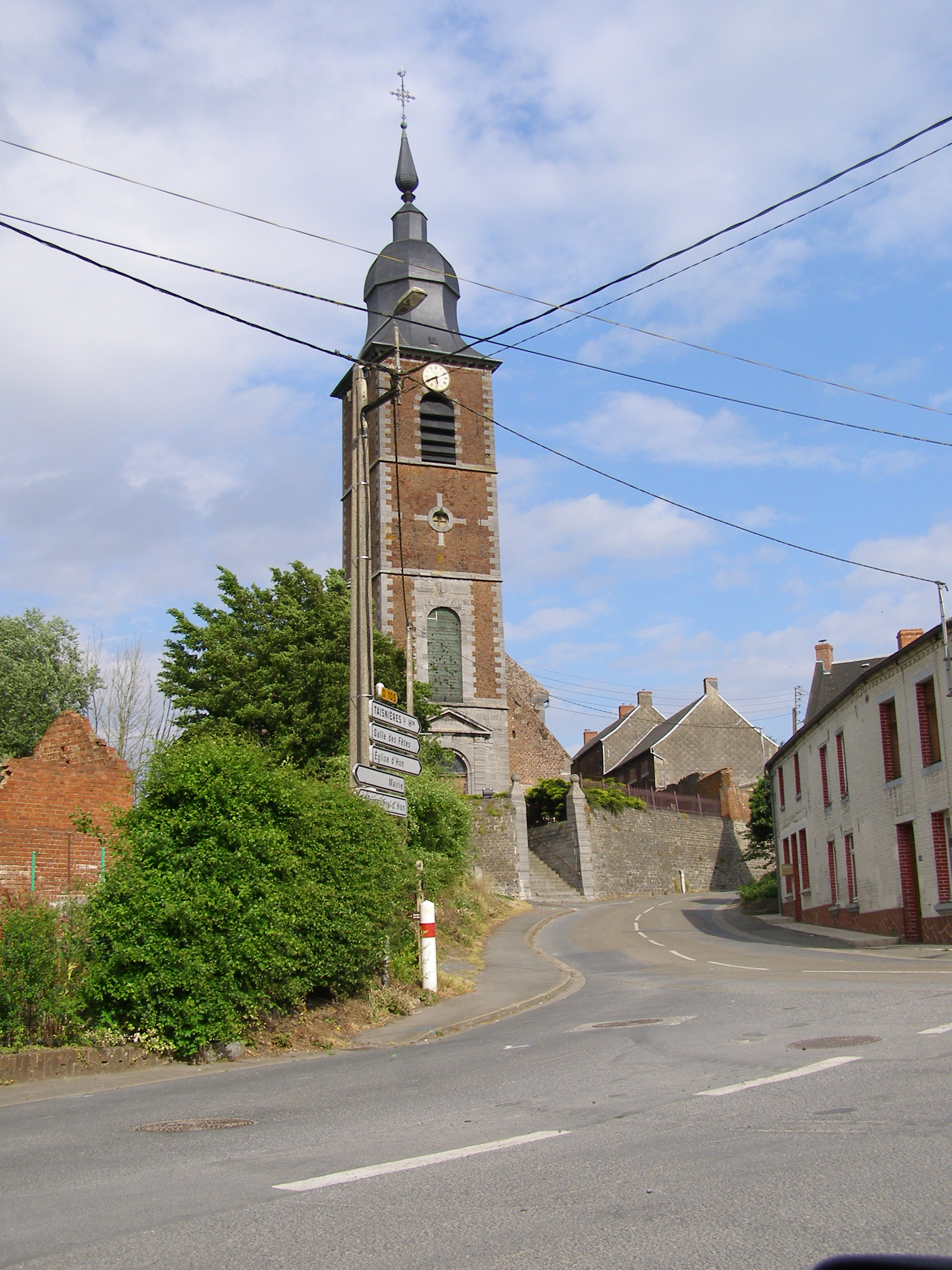
- The church in Hon-Hergies

- Coat of arms
- Location of Hon-Hergies
- Location within France Location within Hauts-de-France
- Coordinates: 50°20′00″N 3°50′00″E
- Country: France
- Region: Hauts-de-France
- Department: Nord
- Arrondissement: Avesnes-sur-Helpe
- Canton: Aulnoye-Aymeries
- Intercommunality: Pays de Mormal

Government
  - Mayor (2020–2026): Luc Bertaux
- Area^{1}: 11.02 km^{2} (4.25 sq mi)
- Elevation: 125 m (410 ft)
- Highest elevation: 152 m (499 ft)
- Lowest elevation: 88 m (289 ft)
- Population (2023): 867
  - Density: 78.7/km^{2} (204/sq mi)
- Time zone: UTC+01:00 (CET)
  - Summer (DST): UTC+02:00 (CEST)
- INSEE/Postal code: 59310 /59570
- ^{1} French Land Register data, which excludes lakes, ponds, glaciers > 1 km^{2} (0.386 sq mi or 247 acres) and river estuaries.

Hon-Hergies (French pronunciation: [ɔ̃ ɛʁʒi]) is a commune in the Nord department in northern France.

== History ==
The village of Hon existed in the 9th century and then became famous for the adulterous loves of Lothaire II, king of Lorraine, nephew of Charles-le-Chauve. In 862, Lothaire II, great-grandson of Charlemagne and king of Lotharingia, donated the stronghold of Canteraine to the abbey of Lobbes. In 1678, by the Treaty of Nijmegen, Louis XIV obtained that all the villages of the provost of Bavay, until then included in the Spanish Netherlands, be attached to his kingdom. In 1790, Hon and Hergies merged to become Hon-Hergies.

== Heraldry ==
Arms of Hon-Hergies	The arms of Hon-Hergies are blazoned :Gules with two golden keys backing onto a saltire, the bites at the top.

These arms are also those of the municipalities of Taisnières-sur-Hon and Moustier-en-Fagne. These three communes were possessions of the abbey of Lobbes from which they inherited the arms.

== Economy ==
There are 7 Petit Granit quarries, 5 marble quarries, 5 lime kilns, 3 wheat mills, 1 oil mill, a marble sawmill and 3 breweries in Hon Hergies.

== See also ==
- Communes of the Nord department
