= Taisnières-sur-Hon =

- Commune
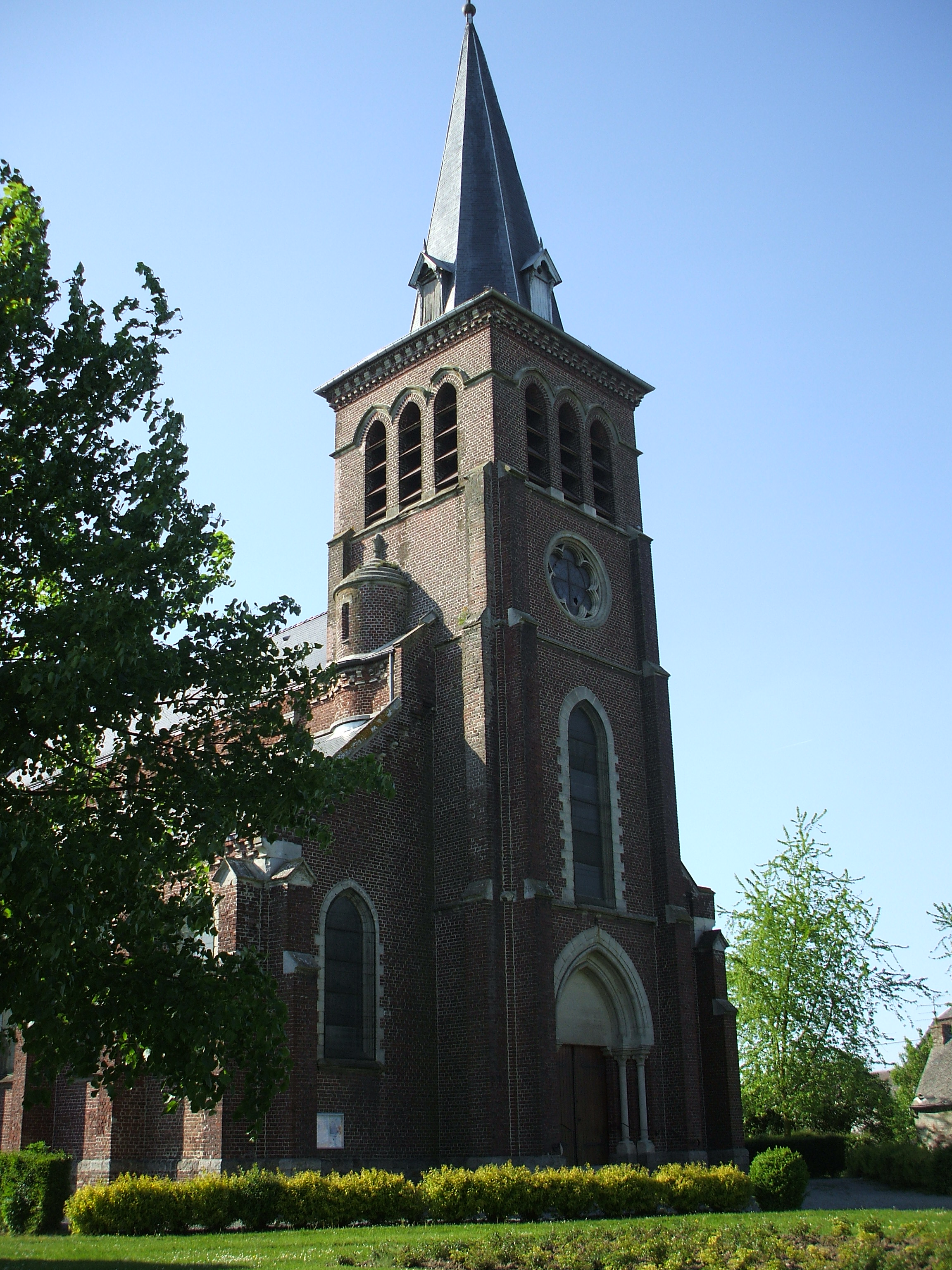
- The church in Taisnières-sur-Hon

- Coat of arms
- Location of Taisnières-sur-Hon
- Location within France Location within Hauts-de-France
- Coordinates: 50°19′11″N 3°50′12″E
- Country: France
- Region: Hauts-de-France
- Department: Nord
- Arrondissement: Avesnes-sur-Helpe
- Canton: Aulnoye-Aymeries
- Intercommunality: CC Pays de Mormal

Government
  - Mayor (2020–2026): Chantal Jacmain
- Area^{1}: 16.22 km^{2} (6.26 sq mi)
- Elevation: 149 m (489 ft)
- Highest elevation: 157 m (515 ft)
- Lowest elevation: 118 m (387 ft)
- Population (2023): 963
  - Density: 59.4/km^{2} (154/sq mi)
- Time zone: UTC+01:00 (CET)
  - Summer (DST): UTC+02:00 (CEST)
- INSEE/Postal code: 59584 /59570
- ^{1} French Land Register data, which excludes lakes, ponds, glaciers > 1 km^{2} (0.386 sq mi or 247 acres) and river estuaries.

Taisnières-sur-Hon (French pronunciation: [tɛnjɛʁ syʁ ɔ̃], literally Taisnières on Hon) is a commune in the Nord department in northern France.

== Heraldry ==
Arms of Taisnières-sur-Hon	The arms of Taisnières-sur-Hon are blazoned : Gules, 2 keys in saltire addorsed Or. (Hon-Hergies, Moustier-en-Fagne and Taisnières-sur-Hon use the same arms.)

== See also ==
- Battle of Malplaquet, which took place near the hamlet of Malplaquet, on the territory of the commune, in 1709
- Communes of the Nord department
