= Bavay =

- Commune
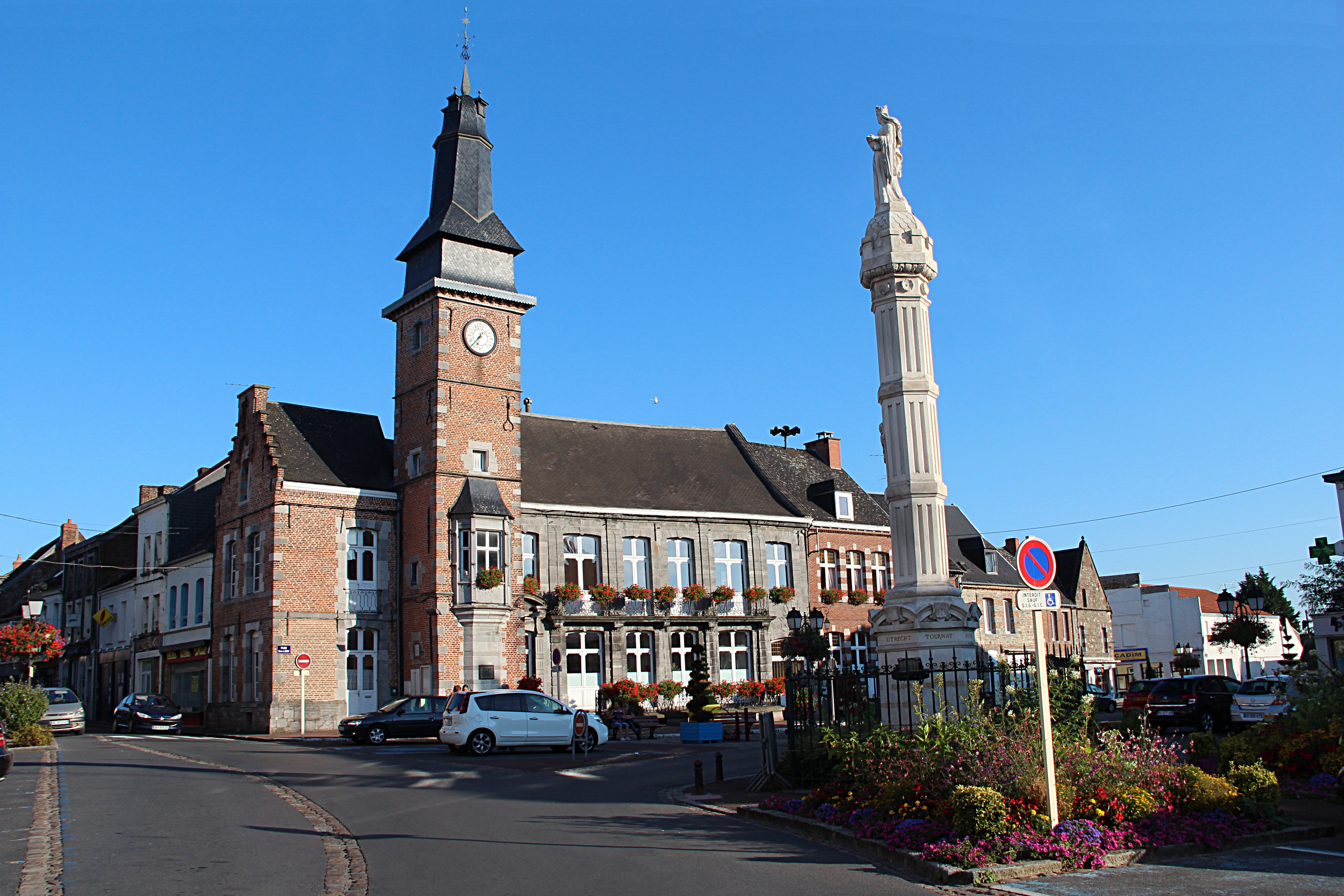
- The Place de Charles de Gaulle

- Coat of arms
- Location of Bavay
- Location within France Location within Hauts-de-France
- Coordinates: 50°17′53″N 3°47′56″E
- Country: France
- Region: Hauts-de-France
- Department: Nord
- Arrondissement: Avesnes-sur-Helpe
- Canton: Aulnoye-Aymeries
- Intercommunality: CC Pays de Mormal

Government
  - Mayor (2020–2026): Francine Caucheteux
- Area^{1}: 10.12 km^{2} (3.91 sq mi)
- Elevation: 123 m (404 ft)
- Highest elevation: 156 m (512 ft)
- Lowest elevation: 108 m (354 ft)
- Population (2023): 3,249
  - Density: 321.0/km^{2} (831.5/sq mi)
- Time zone: UTC+01:00 (CET)
  - Summer (DST): UTC+02:00 (CEST)
- INSEE/Postal code: 59053 /59570
- ^{1} French Land Register data, which excludes lakes, ponds, glaciers > 1 km^{2} (0.386 sq mi or 247 acres) and river estuaries.

Bavay (French pronunciation: [bavɛ]) is a commune in the Nord department in the Hauts-de-France region of northern France. Currently a small town with about 3,200 inhabitants, it was an important Roman city, capital of the Nervii.

== Geography ==
Bavay is located some 20 km east by south-east of Valenciennes and 10 km west of Maubeuge. Main access is on the D649 highway between these two towns which passes through the commune just north of the town. Many roads radiate from the town: the D305 north-west, the D84 north-east, the D932 east by north-east, the D961 south-east, the D932 south-west, the D942 west by south-west, and the D2649 west. A disused railway line runs to the commune from Maubeuge and there is an abandoned railway station south-west of the town. Apart from the town the commune is entirely farmland.

The Hogneau or Bavay river runs through the commune to the west joined by several streams in the commune. The Riez Raoult rises in the north of the commune and flows north while the Ruisseau du Louvion rises nearby and flows north-east. The Ruisseau d'Aviette rises in the east and flows east from the commune. The Ruisseau des Pres comes from the south-east and forms part of the south-eastern border before joining the Bavay river. The Ruisseau de Mecquignies comes from the south and also flows to the Bavay river.

== History ==
=== The legendary founder and apocryphal history ===
From the cordelier Jacques de Guise, Jean Wauquelin wrote in his Chronicles of Hainault, a manuscript of the 15th century, that Bavo, a cousin of Priam while fleeing the city of Troy, after many adventures found a hospitable land where he built a city that was called Belges—the current Bavay. According to Wauquelin, seven roads, dedicated to the planets Jupiter, Mars, Venus, Saturn, Mercury, the Sun, and the Moon, left from seven temples in the city. The introduction of an elective monarchy signaled the decline of the city of Belges and the people of the city lost their unity and could not resist the Roman invasions. This episode has been considered a fable by most historians since the 19th century and even more so the bloody infighting which opposed the reign of Belges Queen Ursa by the former King Ursus.

Yet more than 1000 years after the beginning conquests of Rome, Aubert Miraeus and some chroniclers of Hainaut still evoke Bavay as the "Belgian Rome", or Roma Belgica in an apocryphal historiography compiled from other older sources. The columnist and historian of Hainaut, Jacques de Guise was simply called Belgis (Belge), a name derived by him from Belis (the god Bel).

Various authors and more modern "antiquarians" (people studying antiquity), including Joseph Adolphe Aubenas, while recognizing a lack of evidence in archeology, recalled that other texts, the oldest dating back to at least the 1st century AD also said that the Trojans came to Gaul and founded a great city. Thus, Aubenas, a member of the Society of Antiquaries of France, who in 1804 set up a goal to study the civilization of Gaul, history and French archeology, estimated in 1839 that Jacques de Guise did not invent anything, but only reported what the ancient writers had written before him. Aubenas cites in support of the thesis reported by J de Guise: Ammianus Marcellinus and better Timagenes according to which:

"a part of the population of Gaul (according to the Druids) came from islands far away from beyond the Rhineland, where they had been driven either by frequent wars or by sea inundations".

Rucleri, Hunibaud, and other medieval chroniclers did not invent this story says J Aubenas because Timagene said the same thing after more than 2000 years, and after him, the Trojan origin of the Franks was also affirmed in France:

"in the Chronicle of Fredegar and its fragments and the chronicles of Hunibaud and Freculphus, which in the first half of the 9th century was expressed in formal terms".

=== Gallo-Roman history ===
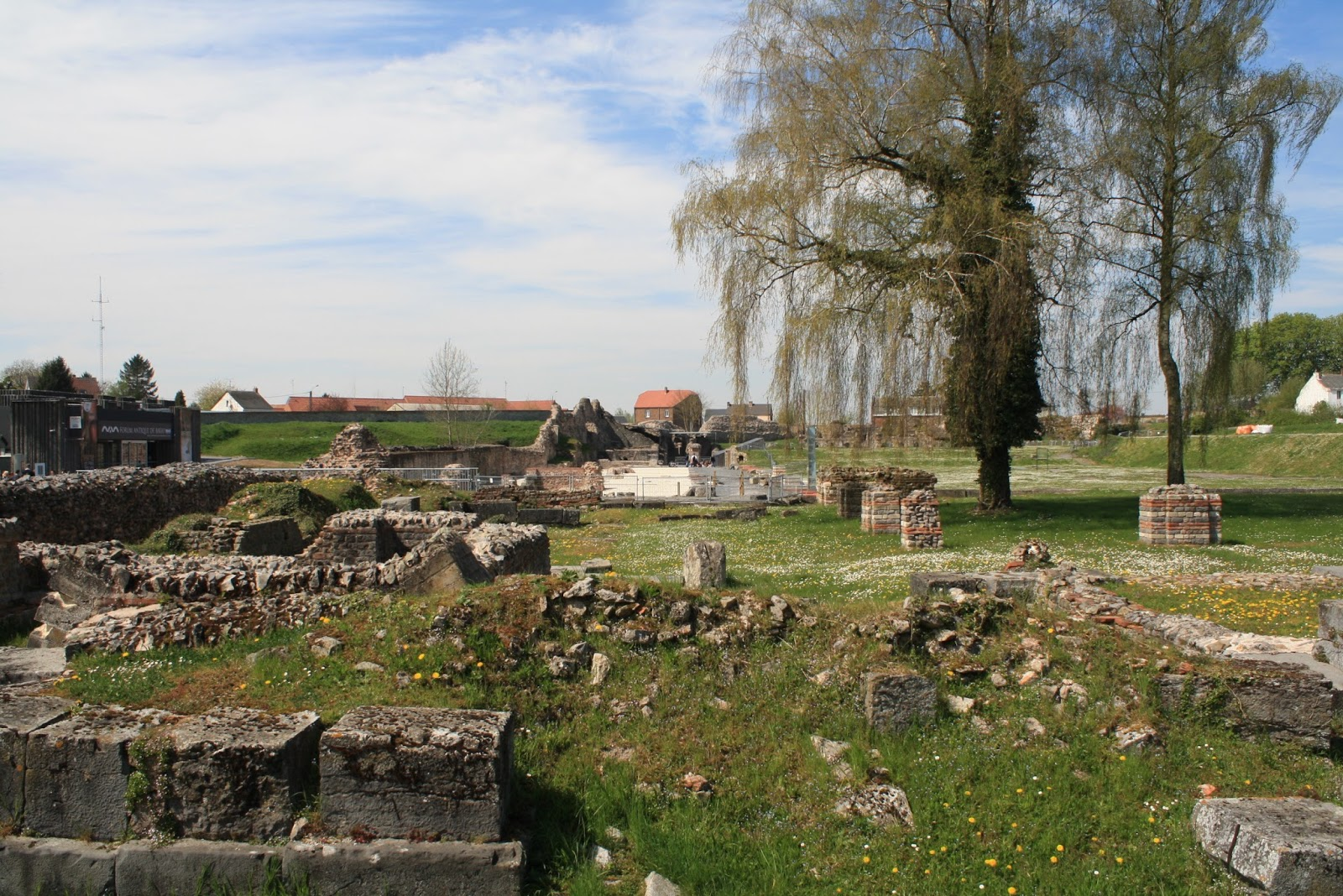
Roman ruins in Bavay (Bagacum)

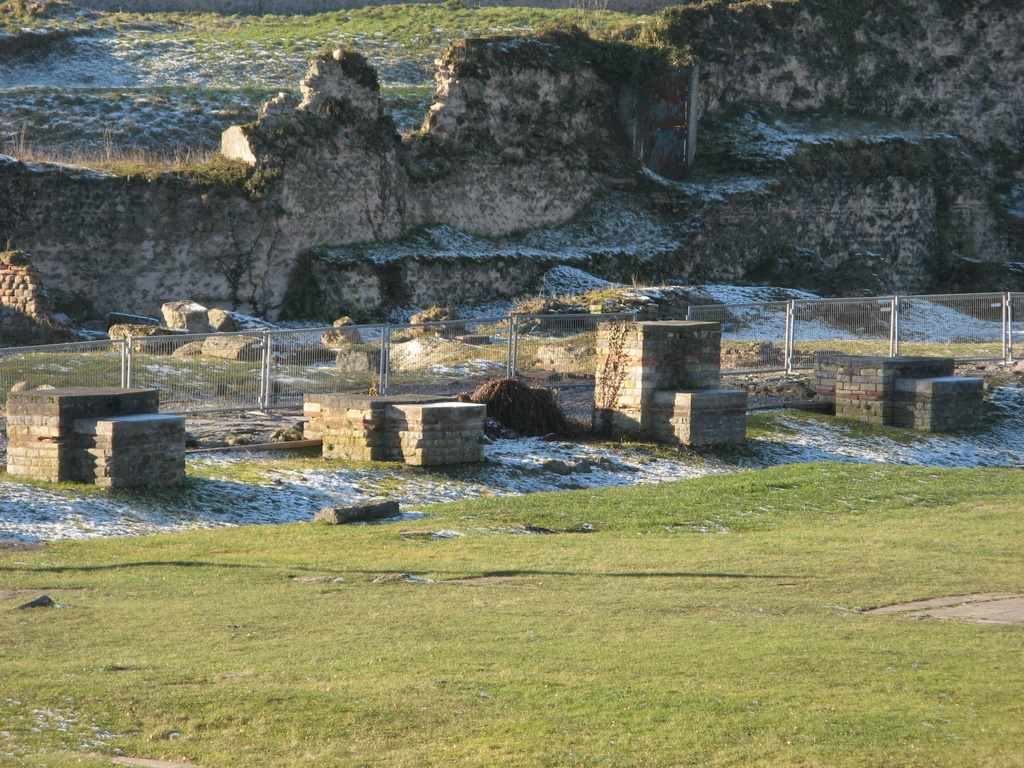
Bagacum

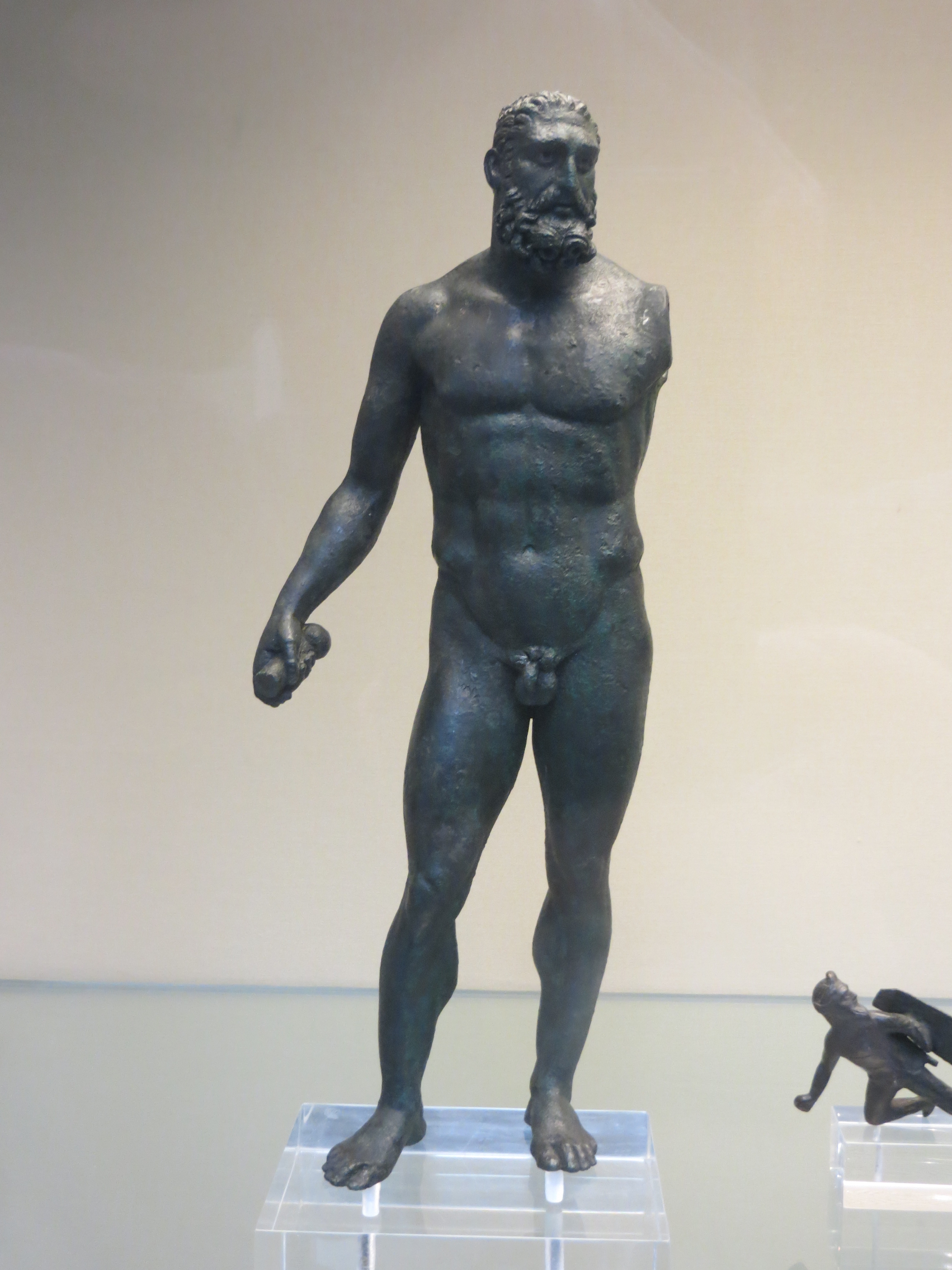
Roman bronze statuette of Hermes found in Bavay, now in the British Museum

The birth of Bavay after the conquest was the result of the reorganization of the territory by Augustus (probably between 16BC and 13BC). The parts of Gaul conquered by Caesar were then divided into three provinces. The region between the Seine and the Rhine was Gallia Belgica and its capital was at Reims. It was divided into "cities" (civitates)—administrative districts which were headed by a chief town. Living in this district were some of the fiercest people of Northern Gaul and they occupied a vast area between the Scheldt, the Sambre, and the Meuse: the Nervii.

The town became the capital for the Nervii under the name of Bagacum or Bavacum and, under the Roman Empire, it was an important junction of seven roads, the meeting-place of which was marked by a milestone, destroyed in the 17th century and replaced in the 19th century by a column.

As the centre of the road junction, Bavay was an obligatory passage between Germania and the naval port of Boulogne-sur-Mer, a bridgehead to Britain. Other routes, seven in total, connected the capital city of the Nervii to the capital cities of neighbouring peoples (Amiens via Arras, Tongeren, Cassel, Trier in the east and Reims in the south). Its position was evidently strategic, but soon these military routes (the future emperor Tiberius transited at Bavay with his armies around 4 AD) were used for commercial purposes. Bavay is mentioned as Baca Conervio on the Tabula Peutingeriana.

From the Claudian period and especially under the Flavians in the late 1st century the city grew. Large monuments were built: a forum, thermal baths fed by an aqueduct bringing water from a fountain near Floursies located twenty kilometres away, and other buildings with a seemingly official nature adorned the city.

=== Medieval ===
Excavations in the Roman Forum resulted in the discovery of ceramics from the 9th and 10th centuries. The history of the town during this period is unclear and reference is necessary to the larger lines of history of the County of Hainaut. It is likely that the Roman Forum was built as part of a defensive system as some later documents referred to viel castel.

In the 12th century the region of Bavay became part of the County of Hainaut and the city was the capital of a Prévôt.

In the 13th and 14th centuries the city was fortified with a medieval design for the enclosure and its major levee is still visible today.

=== Modern era ===
In 1433 the county of Hainaut of which Bavay was part became part of the prosperous Burgundian Netherlands. In 1519, the Burgundian Netherlands became part of the Holy Roman Empire of Charles V also in a very prosperous period. In 1555 Charles V divided his empire and gave the Netherlands to which Bavay belonged to his son Philip II, King of Spain. Bavay then remained part of the Spanish Netherlands until 1678 when, after numerous battles of conquest by Louis XIV, a large part of the southern Spanish Netherlands was united with the kingdom of France. The confirmation of the unification of Bavay with the kingdom of France came in 1678 with the (Treaty of Nijmegen).

The city was taken by the Austrians who entered the city on 21 July 1792

Louvignies-Bavay merged with Bavay in 1946. Until 2015, the town was the seat of the former canton of Bavay.

=== Heraldry ===
Arms of Bavay	Blazon: Argent, a lion gules debruised by an inescutcheon of Or with a lion sable.

== Administration ==
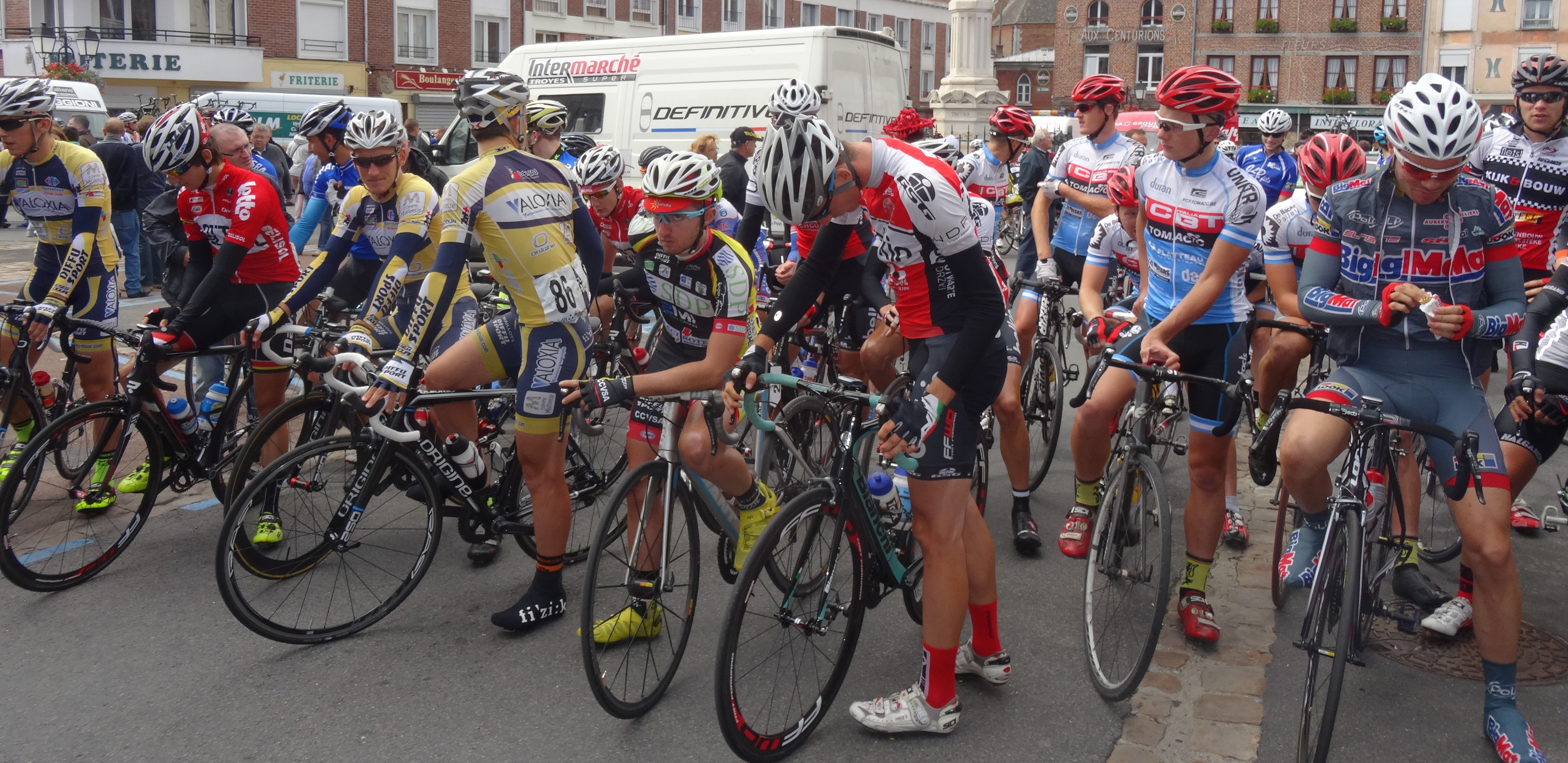
The Grand Prix of Bavay on 17 August 2014

List of Successive Mayors of Bavay

From	To	Name	Party
1826		Pierre Amand Cagnon	
1880		Anatole Martial Aimé Crapez	
1904		Gaston Derome	
1909		Gaston Derome	
2001	2020	Alain Fréhaut	ind.
2020	2026	Francine Caucheteux	

The municipal majority in Bavay is the Independents. The Mayor stood for election to the General Council as a UPN (Union Pour le Nord or Union for Nord region) candidate.

== Demography ==
The inhabitants of the commune are known as Bavaisiens or Bavaisiennes in French.

Historical population

Year	Pop.	±% p.a.
1793	1,339	—
1800	1,455	+1.19%
1806	1,484	+0.33%
1821	1,617	+0.57%
1831	1,635	+0.11%
1836	1,650	+0.18%
1841	1,601	−0.60%
1846	1,620	+0.24%
1851	1,635	+0.18%
1856	1,587	−0.59%
1861	1,646	+0.73%
1866	1,765	+1.41%
1872	1,777	+0.11%
1876	1,851	+1.03%
1881	1,863	+0.13%
1886	1,837	−0.28%
1891	1,854	+0.18%
1896	1,960	+1.12%
1901	1,910	−0.52%

Year	Pop.	±% p.a.
1906	1,799	−1.19%
1911	1,941	+1.53%
1921	1,772	−0.91%
1926	1,800	+0.31%
1931	1,803	+0.03%
1936	1,886	+0.90%
1946	2,602	+3.27%
1954	2,942	+1.55%
1962	3,024	+0.34%
1968	3,377	+1.86%
1975	3,746	+1.49%
1982	4,193	+1.62%
1990	3,751	−1.38%
1999	3,581	−0.51%
2007	3,429	−0.54%
2012	3,435	+0.03%
2017	3,326	−0.64%
2023	3,249	−0.39%

Source: EHESS and INSEE

== Economy ==
In 2010, the median fiscal revenue per household was €23,634.

== Culture and heritage ==
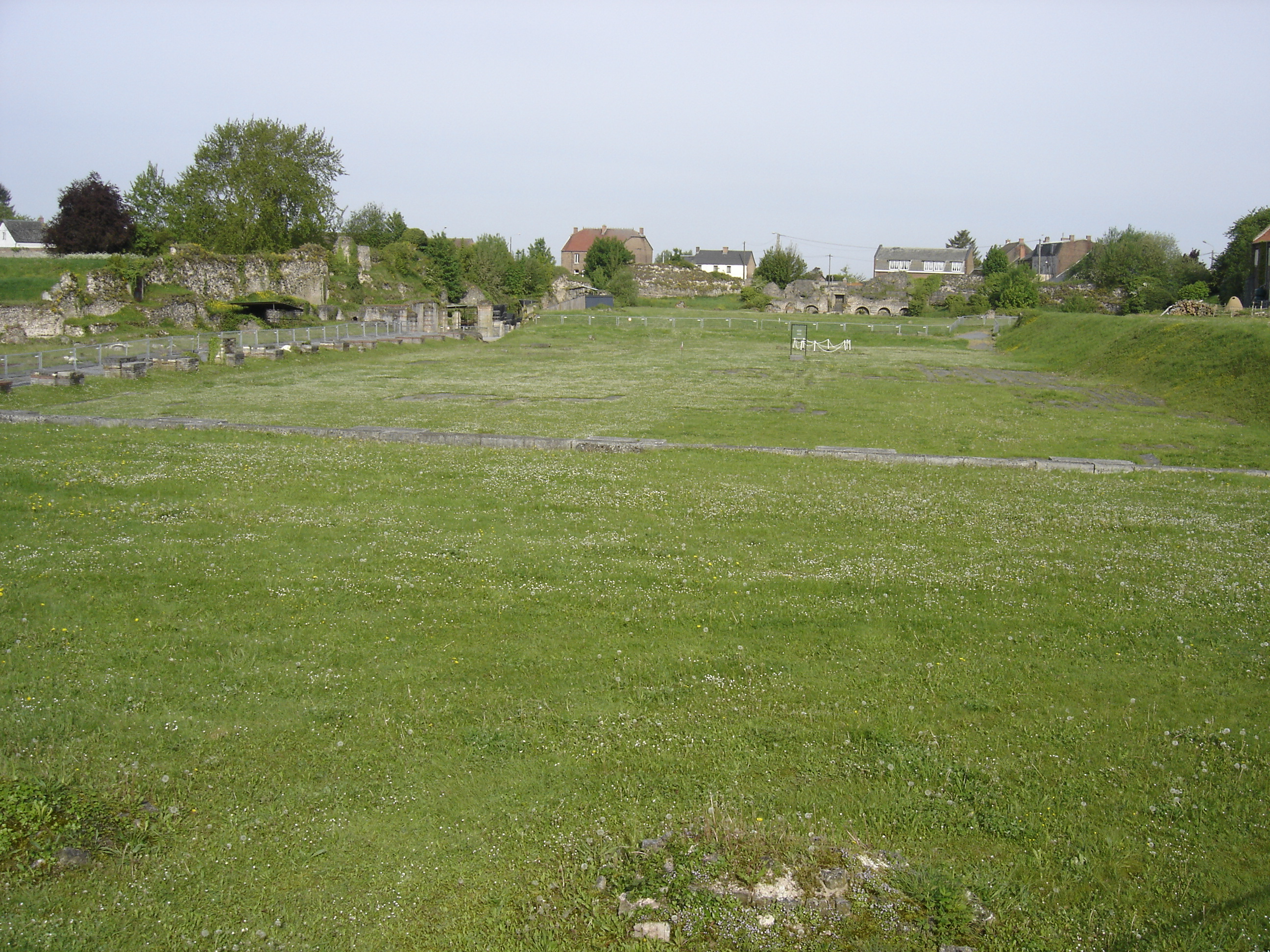
Gallo-Roman Forum

The commune has a large number of sites that are registered as historical monuments. Below is an abridged summary of the most important sites.

=== Civil heritage ===
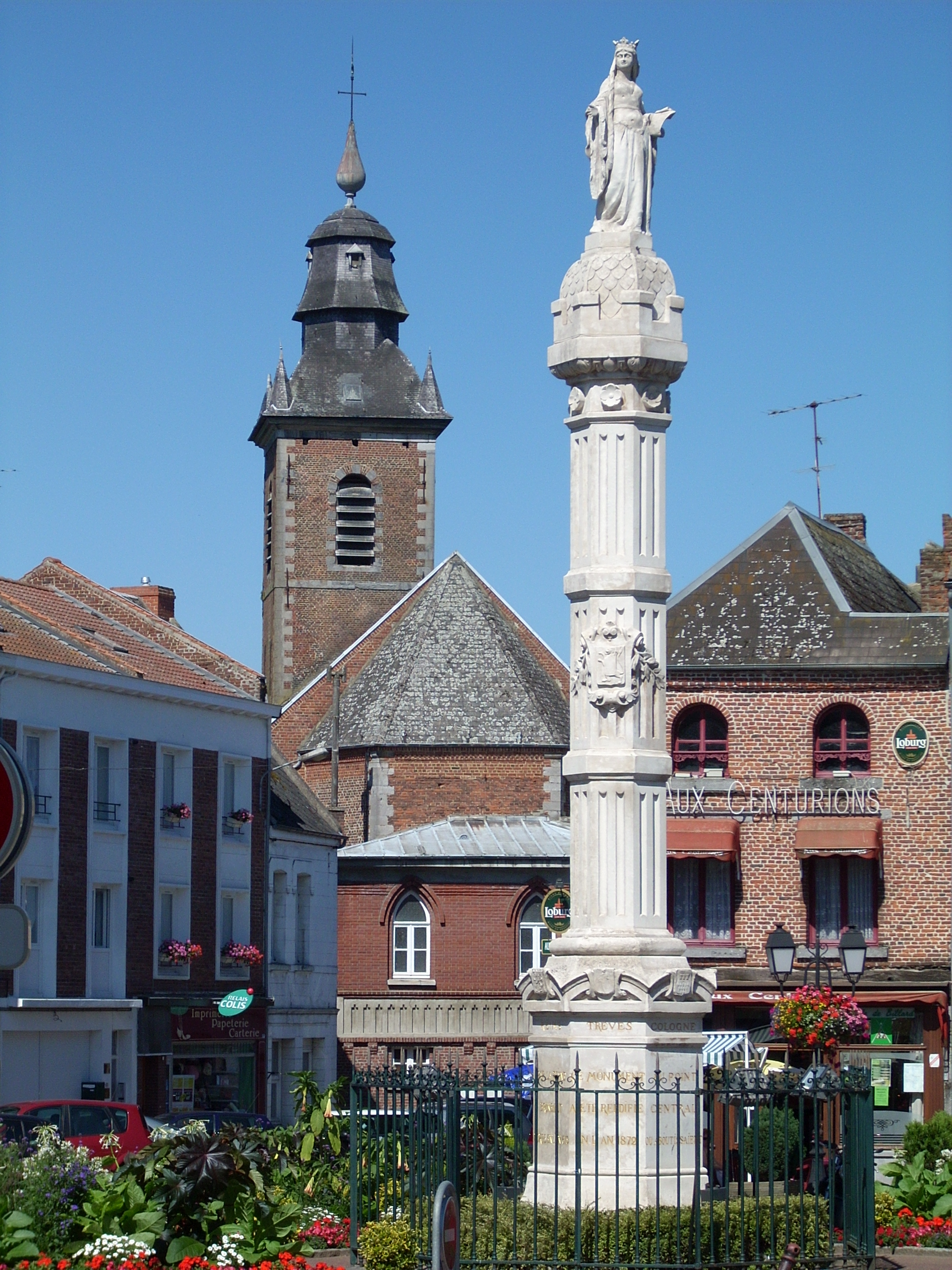
The Brunehaut Column

- The War Memorial (1923)
- A Chateau at Louvignies (17th century)
- A Flour Mill at Louvignies (1823)
- The Theillier Brewery at 11 Rue de Chaussée (18th century)
- The Alphonse Derome Oil Mill at 4 Rue Eugène-Wascart (1860)
- A Lavoir (Public Laundry) at Chemin des Foulons (1896)
- The Moulin de Fréhart Flour Mill at Rue Fréhart (1751)
- The Derome Fertilizer Factory at 45-47 Rue de la Gare (1860)
- A Dovecote at 2 Rue de Glatignies (18th century)
- The Brunehaut Column in the Grand Place (17th century)
- The Town Hall in the Grand Place (17th century)
- A Gallo-Roman Archaeological site at 10 Rue Saint-Maur (1st century). There is a Forum from the 1st century whose importance was unveiled by the 1940 bombing that destroyed the buildings covering it. Several hypocausts have been found under the church and under some houses belonging to a set of at least five hypocausts with signs of important baths, perhaps public.
- The City Fortifications (9th century)

Other sites of interest

- The Bavay Museum contains some pottery pieces of unknown function which are registered as historical objects.
- The Communal Cemetery of Bavay contains 12 graves managed by the Commonwealth War Graves Commission of British soldiers who died towards the end of the First World War in August and November 1918
- The Circuit des Sources hiking trail gives access to part of the heritage of the town.

=== Religious heritage ===
The commune has several religious buildings and structures that are registered as historical monuments:

- An Oratory at 22 Rue de Chaussée (18th century)
- The Notre-Dame de Walcourt Oratory at D961 (1817)
- The Church of Saint Nicolas (18th century)
- The Parish Church of Our Lady of the Assumption (16th century). The Church contains several items that are registered as historical objects:
  - A Tombstone for Charles Richer (1684)
  - A Tombstone for Jacques de Maulde (17th century)
  - A Tombstone for Mathieu Ghondry Mayeur de Louvignies (1578), Philipotte du Vivier (1611), and Jean Ghondry (1623)
  - 2 Statues: Bishops (18th century)
  - A Tombstone for Philippe Mercier (1778)
  - A Tombstone for Jean de Chasteler and Françoise de Carondelet (1624)
- Old Convents (16th century)

=== Environmental heritage ===
- The Carrière des Nerviens Regional Nature Reserve is mostly located in the communal territory just 1 km west of the town centre.

== Picture gallery ==
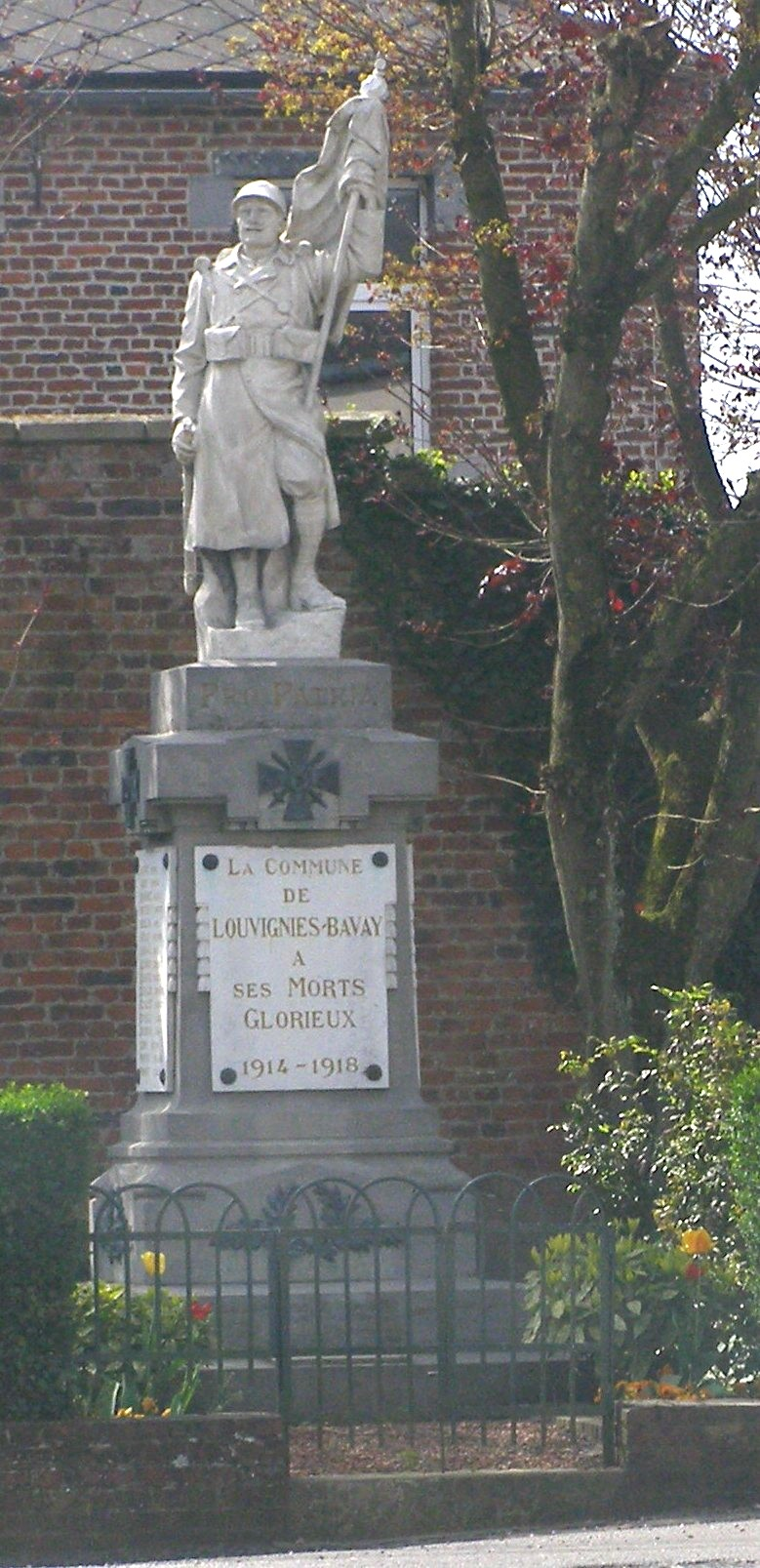
War Memorial at Louvignies-Bavay

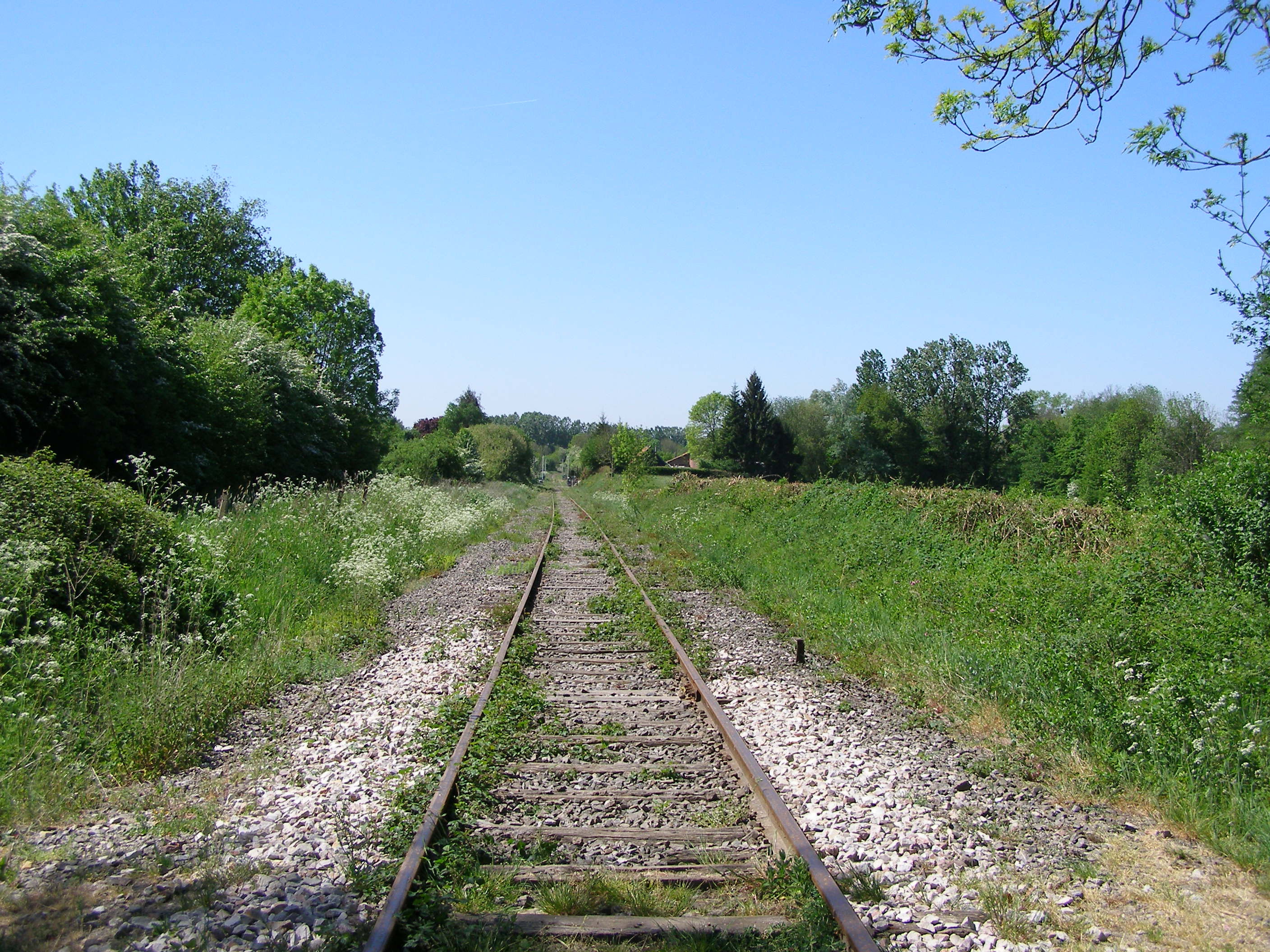
Disused Railway line

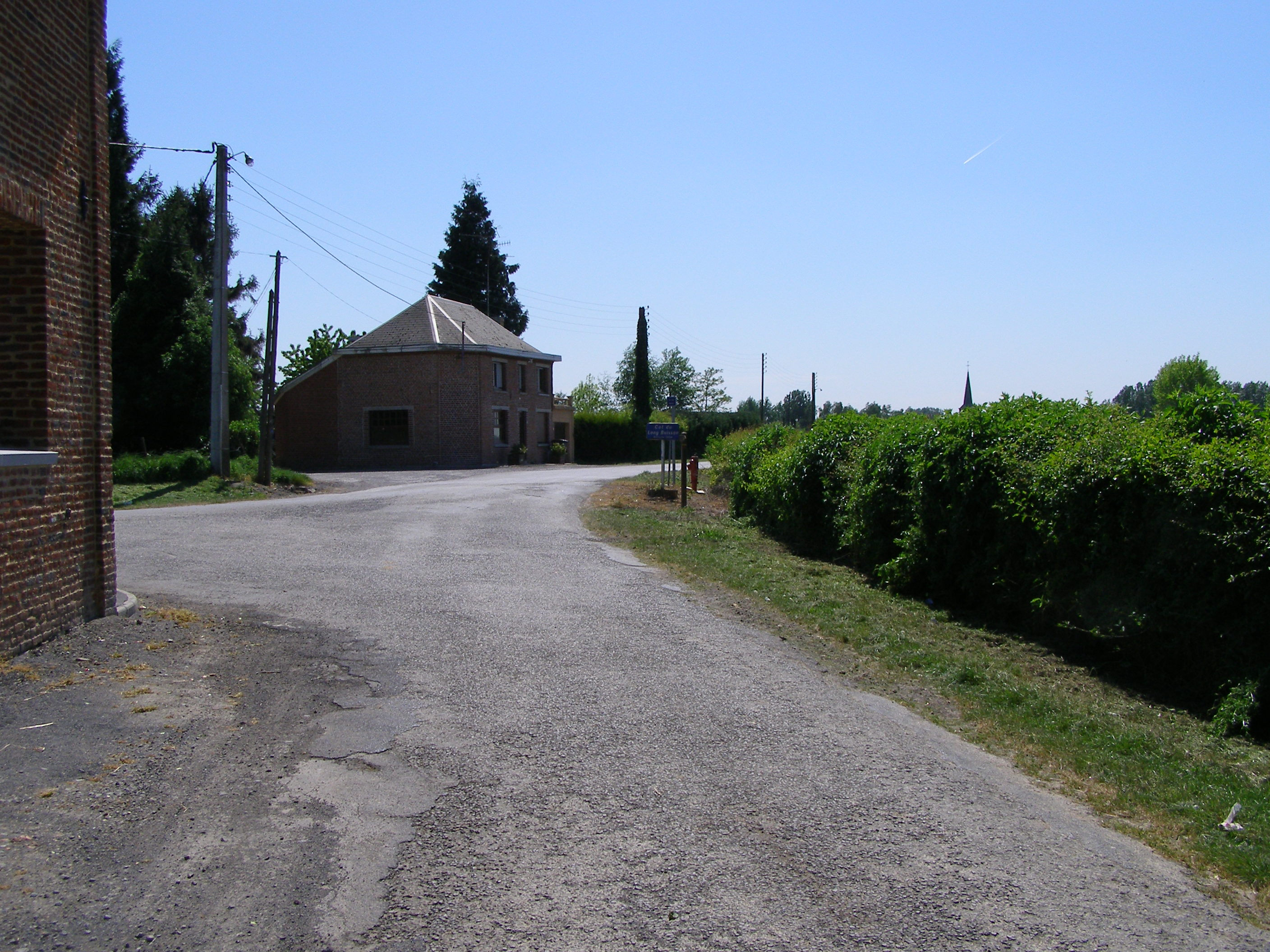
Col du long buisson

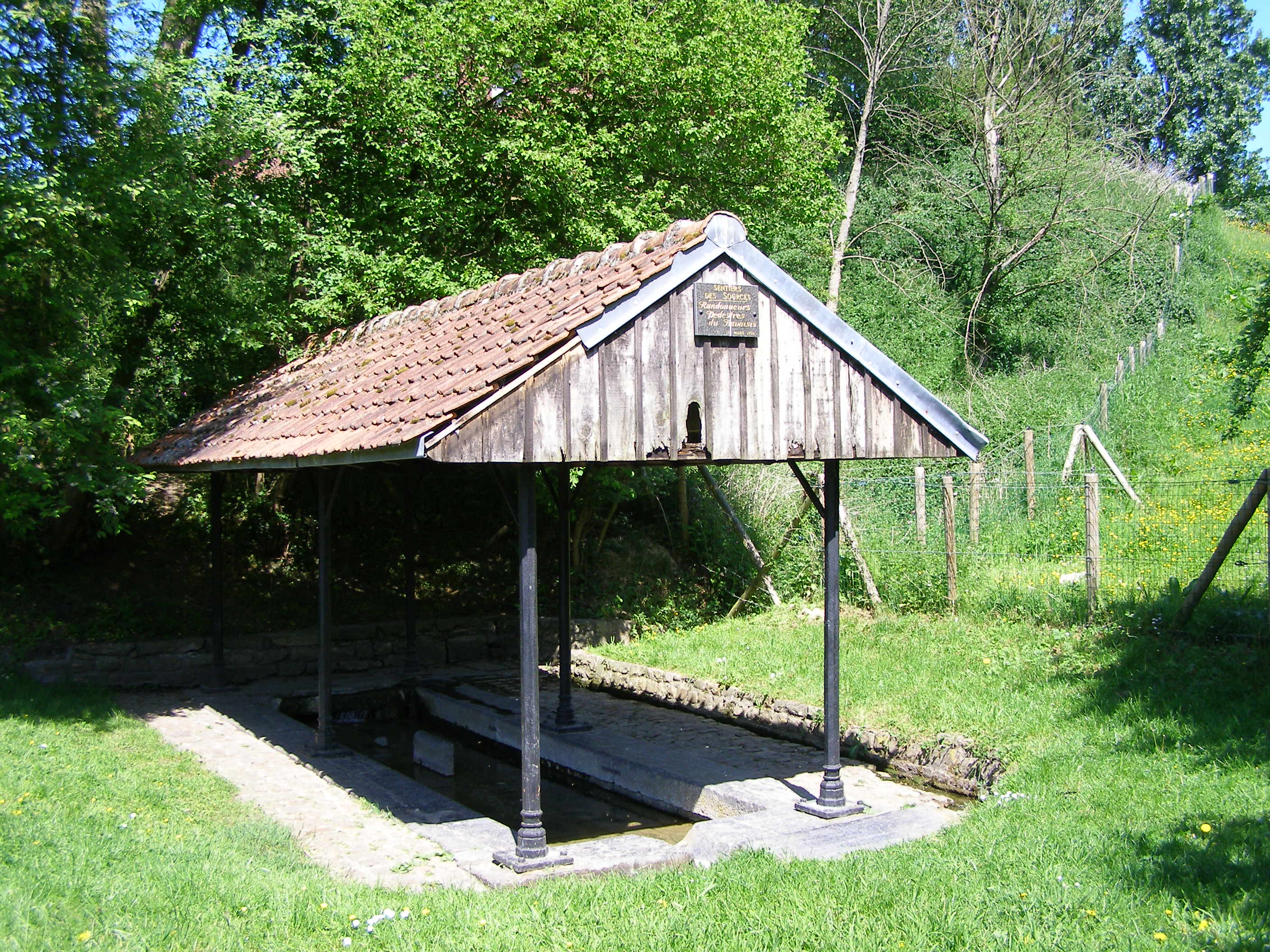
Public Laundry

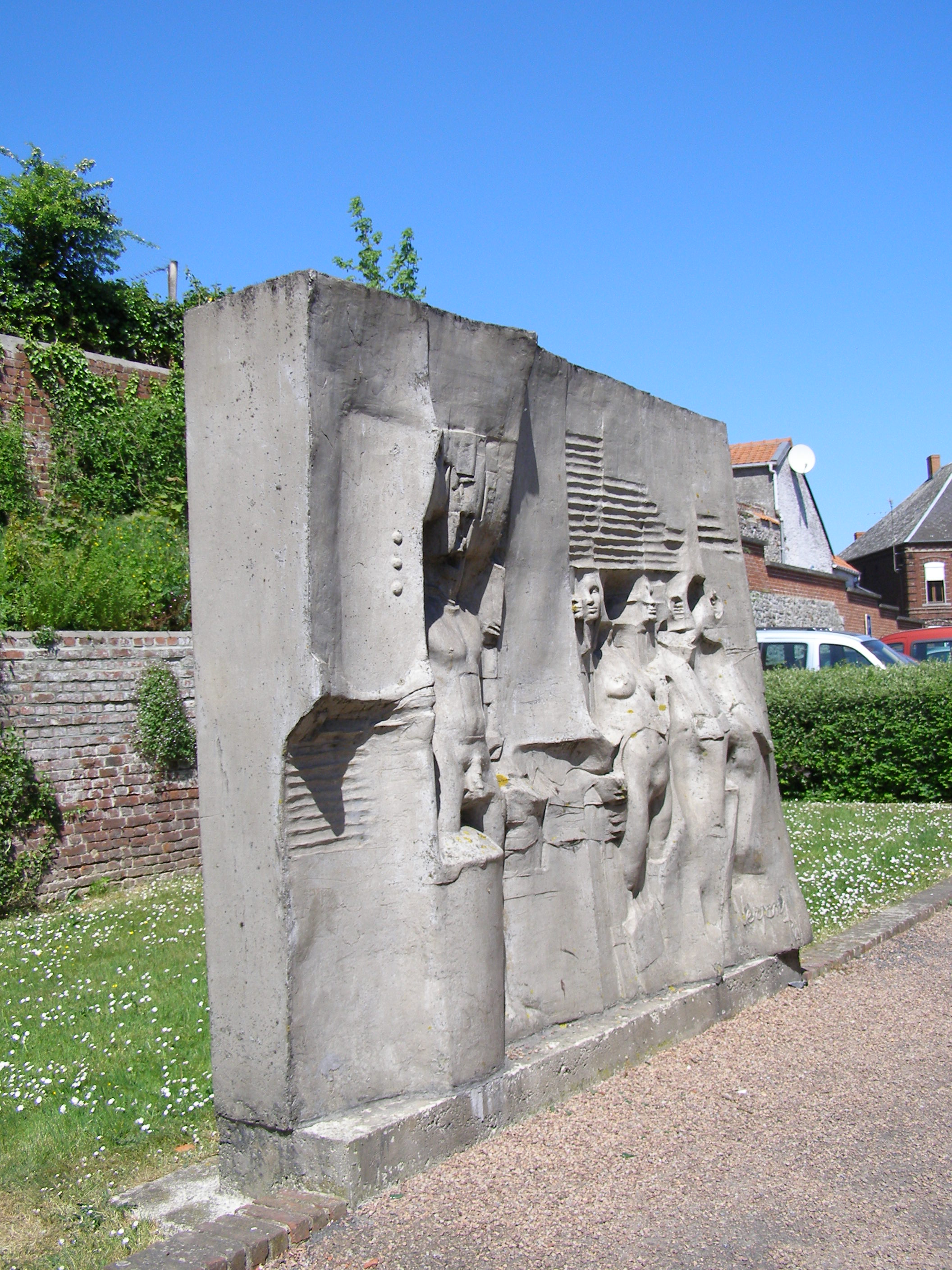
Monument along the D932 road

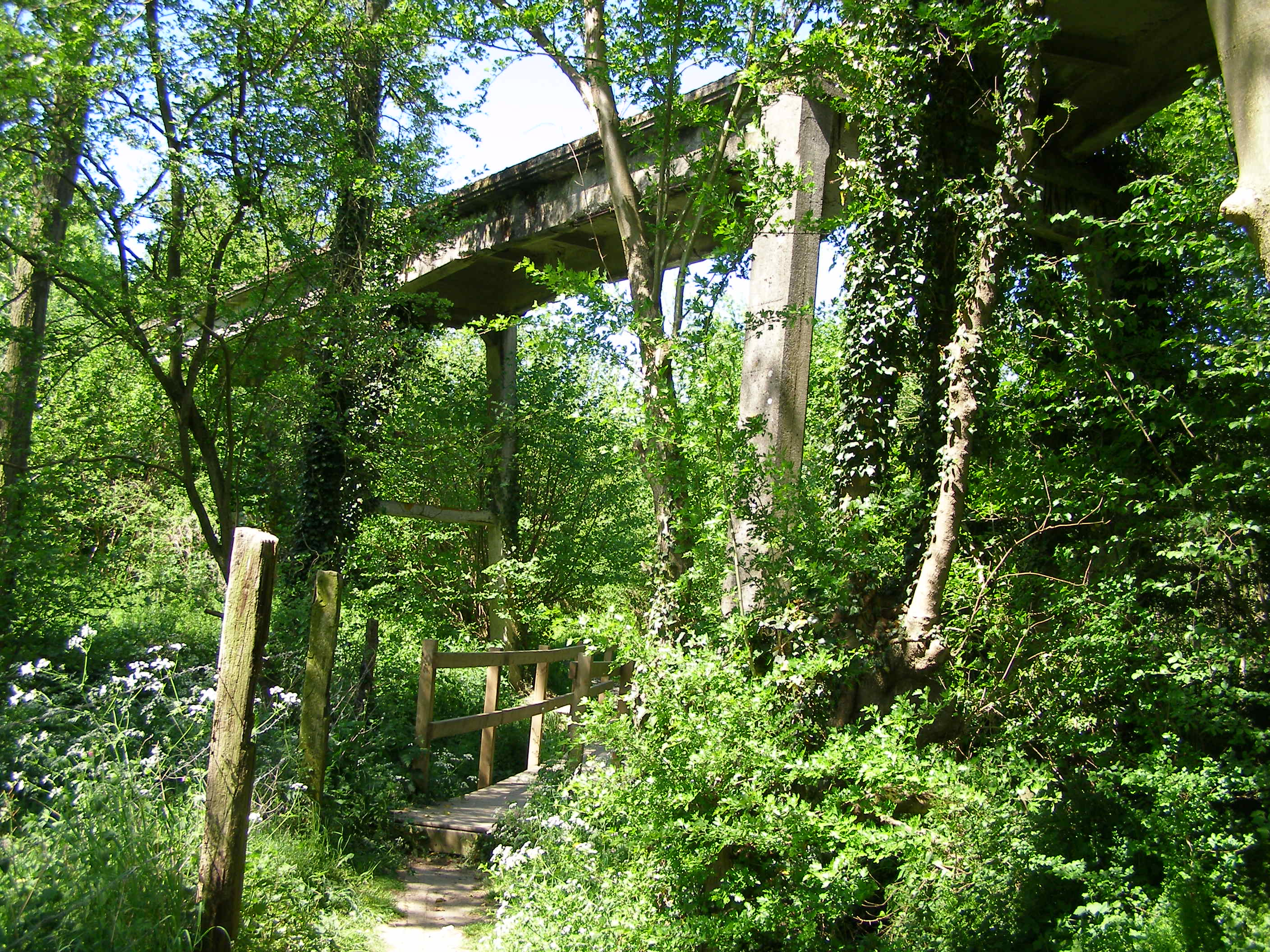
The White Bridge

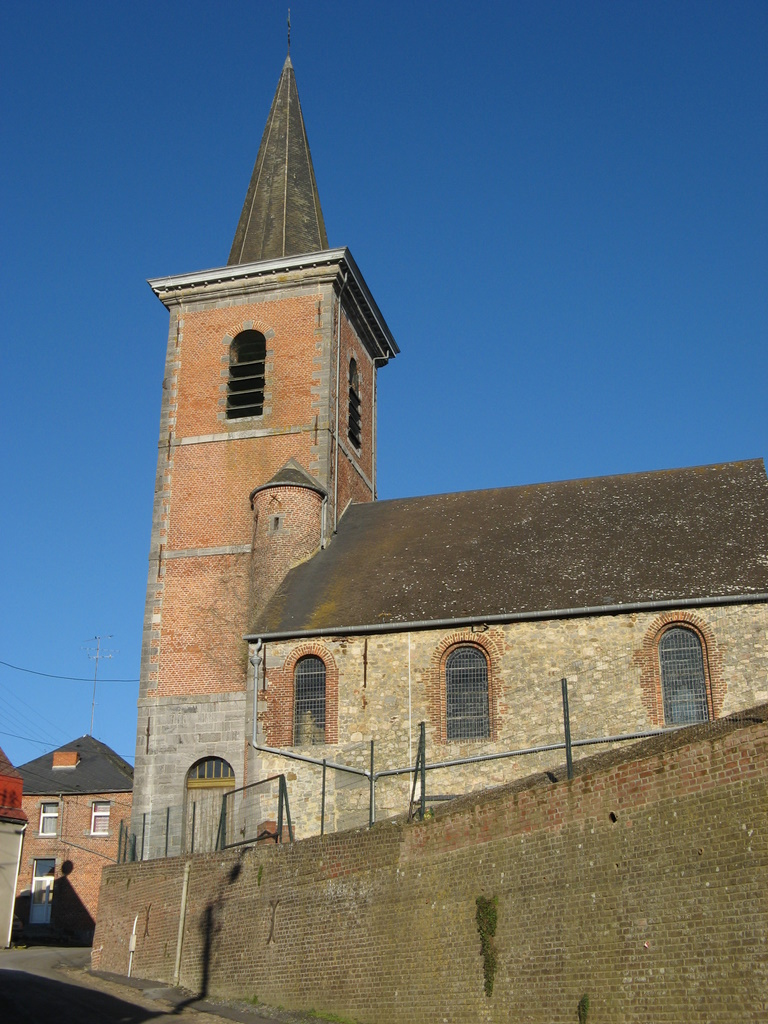
Church of Louvignies-Bavay

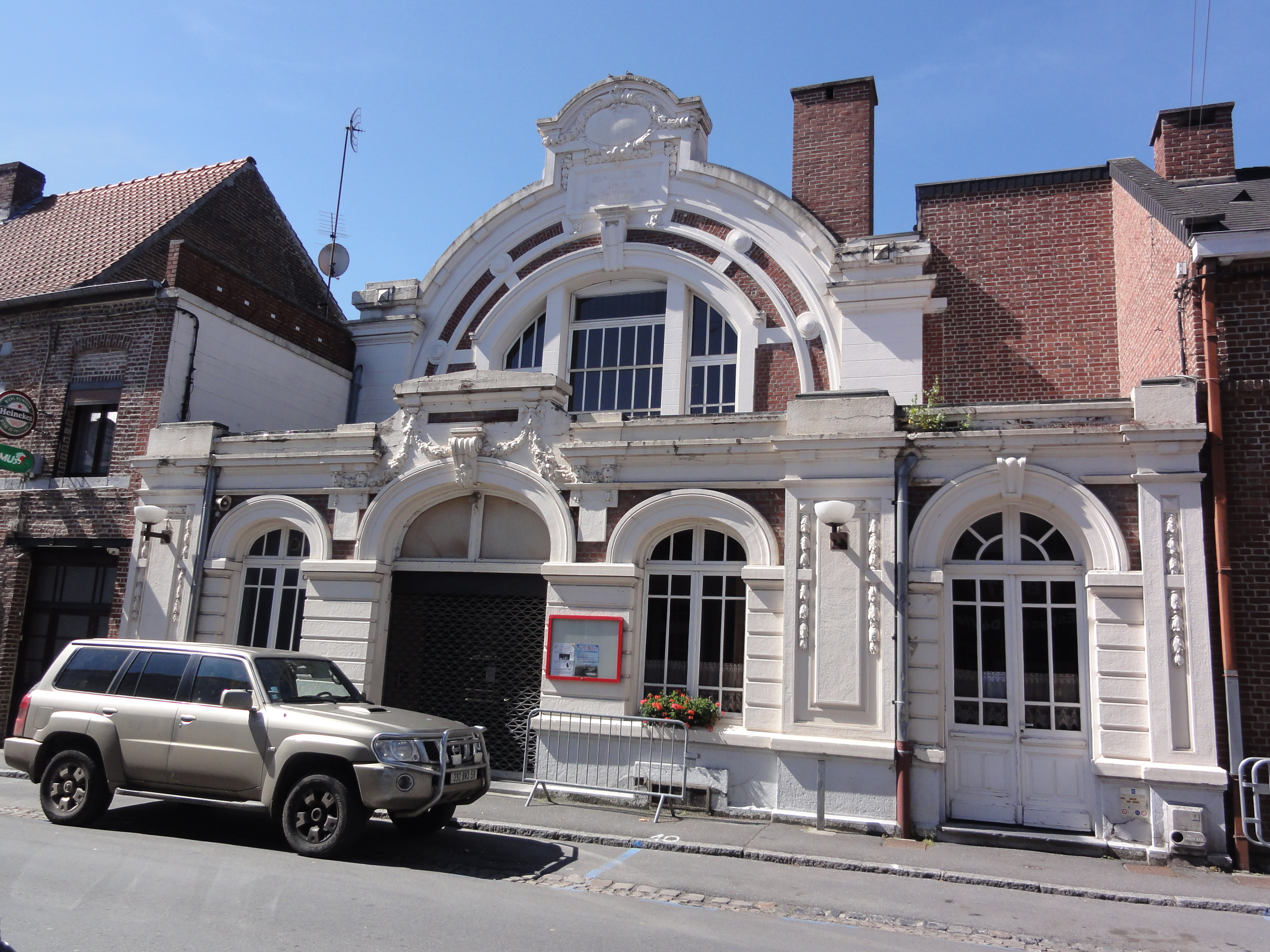
The Community Hall

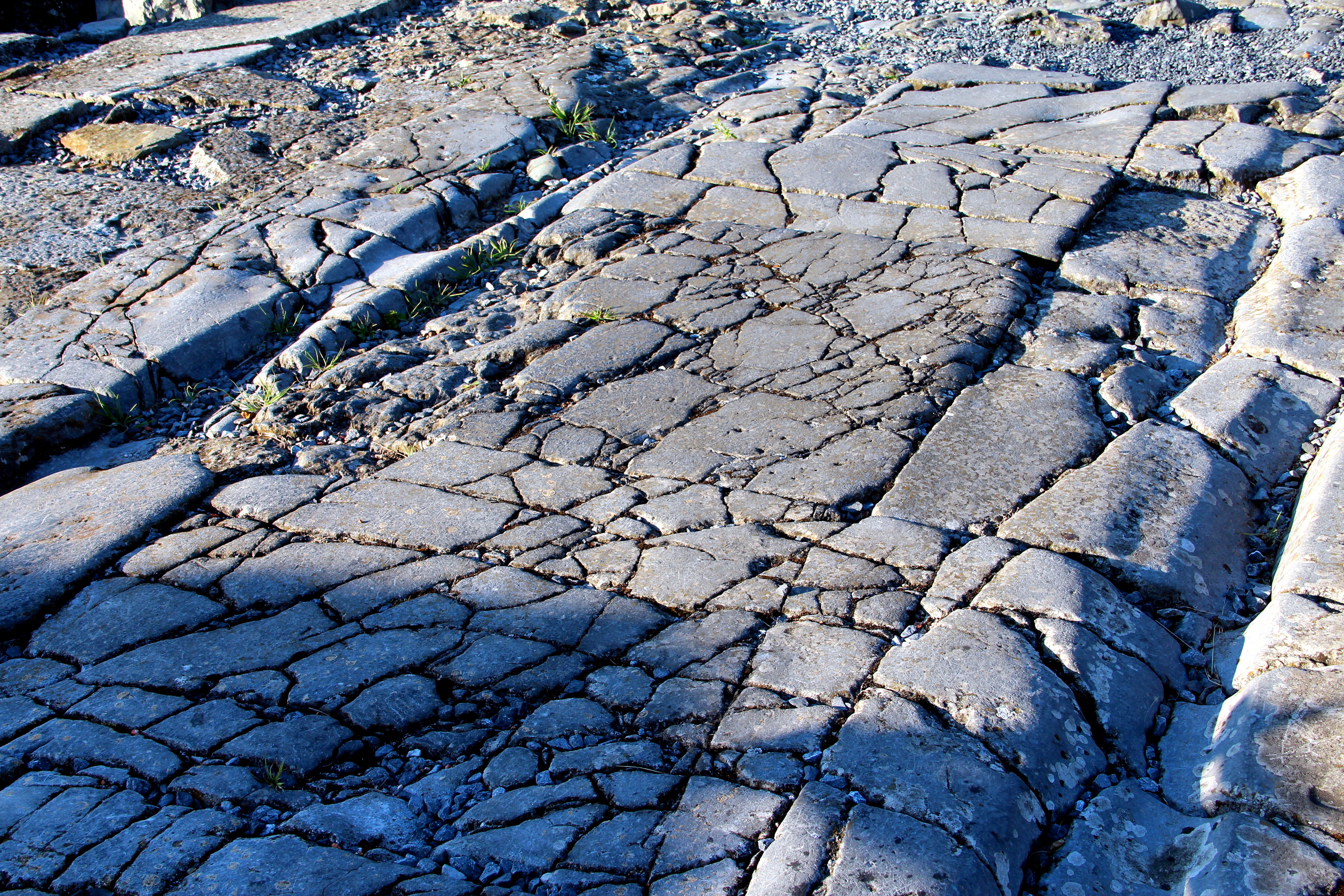
Ruts on the Roman road

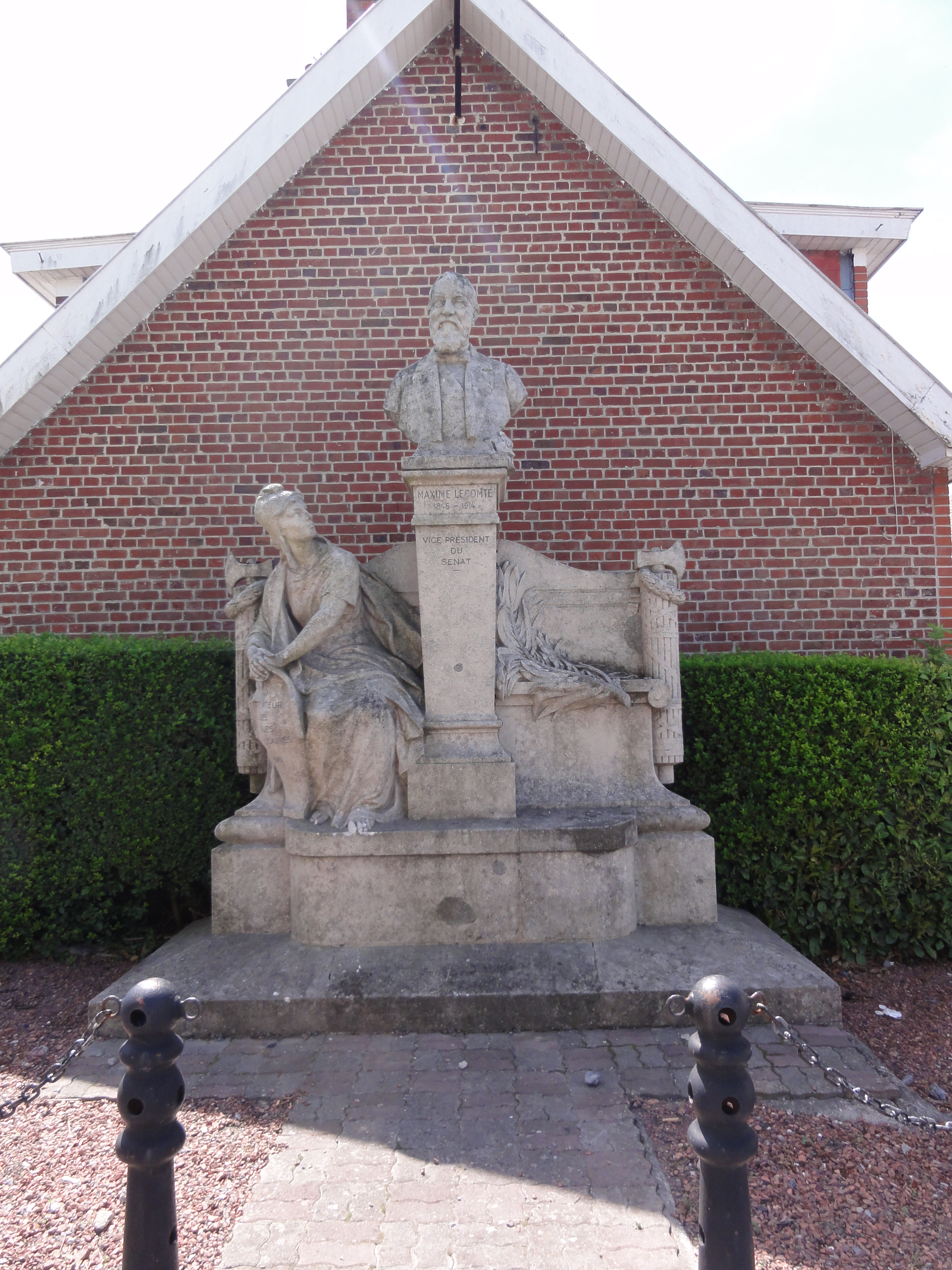
The Maxime Lecomte monument

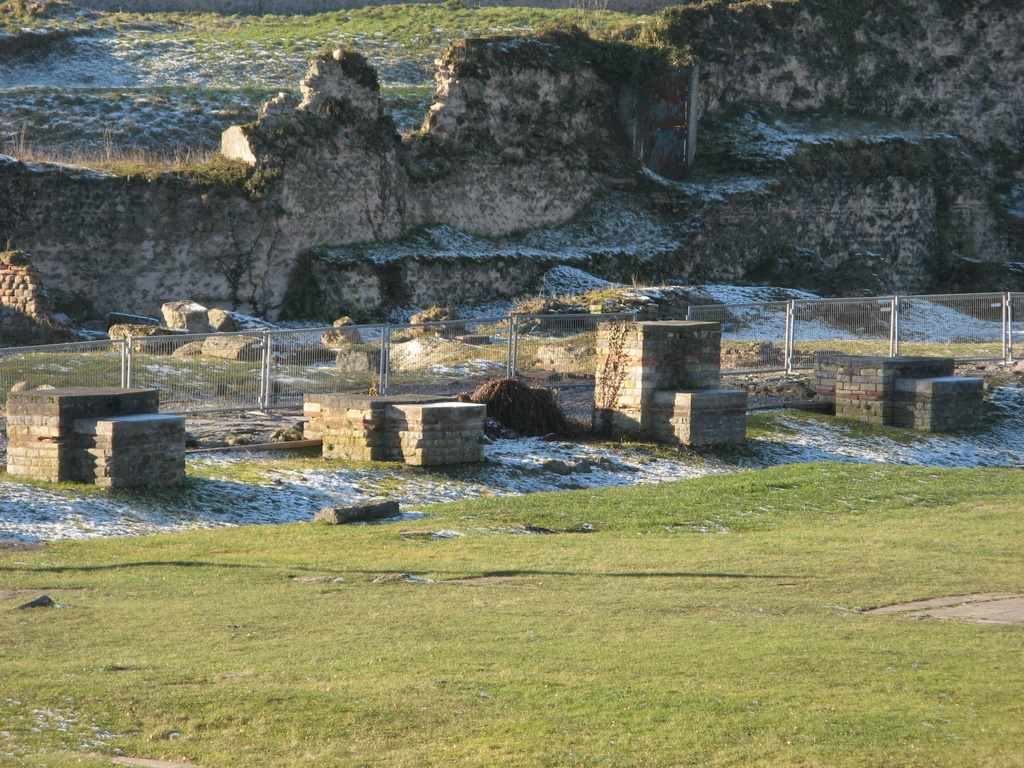
Bagacum

== Notable people linked to the commune ==
- Jean de Haynin was a famous chronicler known for using for the first time the term "Walloon" in his writings. Born on 14 October 1427 and died 12 May 1495 in his castle at Hainin (Belgium), he was an author, knight, Lord of Hainin, Louvignies at Bavay (where a street has been named after him), Anfroipret, Oby, and Broeucq (in Seclin). Although from a very ancient family of Lords of Hainin, he was the first to have a fixed abode and he is buried in the church of Hainin with Marie de Roisin, his wife since 1454 (born September 1435, died 21 August 1471). Entered into arms in 1452, he is best known in Belgium for his writings on his many rides with the troops of the Dukes of Burgundy. He is also noted for documenting in his hand his origins and dates of birth of his thirteen children, leaving a blank for only his own death which was filled in by his son François.
- Jean Lemaire de Belges, born at Belges—today called Bavay—in 1473.
- Jean Goudezki was born and died in Louvignies, Bavay (1866–1934). Author, poet, singer at the famous cabaret Le Chat noir in Paris.
- Maxime Lecomte, a politician, MP, and senator, was born in Bavay in 1846. He was "Parliamentary Reporter" for the 1905 law separating church and state in the senate.

== See also ==
- Communes of the Nord department

=== Bibliography ===
- (in French) Albums of Croy, County of Hainaut Volume 6, vol. 9 of the Collection, Brussels, 1989 (iconographic sources)
- (in French) N. Choin, For a study of the County of Hainaut in the second half of the 14th century, based on the oldest documents related to Bavay, Bouchain, Le Quesnoy and Maubeuge, Lille, 2000
- (in French) N. Choin, Introduction to the Study of the Provost District Accounts of Bavay and Maubeuge (1354–1368)
- (in French) N. Choin, Oldest Documents for the areas of Bavay, Bouchain, Le Quesnoy and Maubeuge, 2007
- (in French) N. Choin, Accounts of the receiver of Hainaut for the year 1359–1360 accompanied by an introduction to the study of land management by the County of Hainaut in the 14th century, 2007 (Relates to the domain of the provost of Bavay in the 14th century)
- (in French) L. Delhaye, Bavay and the region that surrounds it, Douai, Dechristé, 1869, 501 pp. Read online (accessed 24 July 2013)
- (in French) Lucien Delhaye, History of the provostship of Bavay: followed by a dissertation on the ancient capital of Nervie, Bavay Printing Nestor Jouglet, 1873, 251 pp. Read online (accessed 25 July 2013)
- (in French) C. Pavot, The City of Bavay in the 14th–15th centuries, the privileges of its citizens and its business activities, 1990
