= Siege of Maubeuge =

Siege during World War I

- Part of the Great Retreat on the Western Front in the First World War
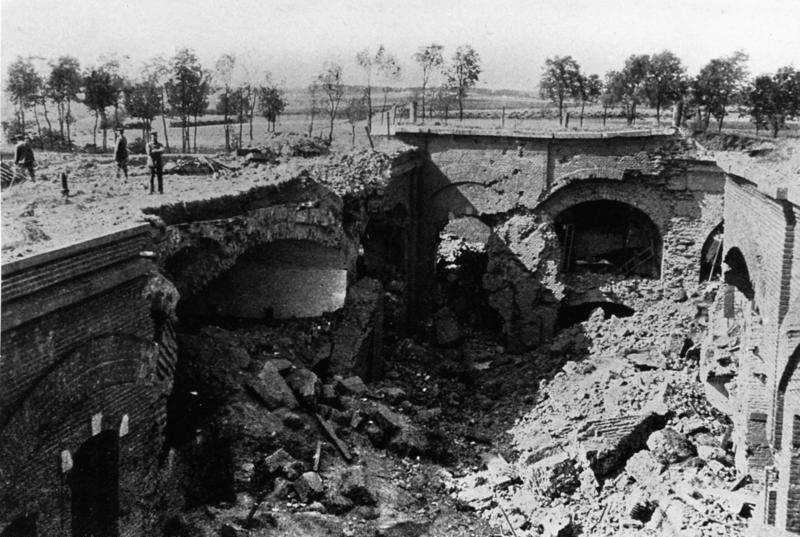
- Destroyed casemate at Maubeuge
Date	24 August – 7 September 1914
Location	The Entrenched Camp of Maubeuge (le camp retranché de Maubeuge) France 50°16′39″N 03°58′24″E
Result	German victory

Belligerents
Germany	France

Commanders and leaders
Karl von Bülow; Alexander von Kluck; Hans von Zwehl	Joseph Joffre; Joseph Fournier

Strength
1 reserve infantry division; 1 active-army brigade; 21 heavy and super-heavy artillery batteries	49,000 men; 460 guns; 200 machine-guns

Casualties and losses
1,100	49,000; (1,300 killed, 3,000 wounded); 32,692–45,000 captured; 377–600 guns; (incl. machine-guns)
- Maubeuge, a commune in the Nord department in northern France

The siege of Maubeuge took place from 24 August – 7 September 1914, at the Entrenched Camp of Maubeuge (le camp retranché de Maubeuge) the start of the First World War on the Western Front. The railway from Thionville (Diedenhofen, 1871–1919) to Luxembourg City, Arlon and Namur into Belgium had been cut by the demolition of the rail bridge over the Meuse at Namur in Belgium. During the siege, the German armies in the north could use only the single-track line from Trier to Liège, Brussels, Valenciennes and Cambrai, which could accommodate a maximum of forty trains a day.

At the end of August the garrison made several sorties but the third was a costly failure, after which the French prepared to receive the German attack. The German bombardment began at 1:00 p.m. on 29 August, assisted by agents in the Entrenched Position who passed reports on the fall of shot, greatly increasing the accuracy of the German guns. The forts and infantry shelters (ouvrages) were wrecked by the German and Austrian super-heavy howitzers; German medium artillery proved unexpectedly effective.

Parts of Maubeuge were set on fire, causing an exodus of civilians and deserters to the village of Hautmont to the south-west. From 1 to 7 September, the French were forced out into the open and infantry attacks from the east gradually overran the French defences on both sides of the Sambre, forcing the survivors back level with Maubeuge. Brigadier-General Joseph Fournier, the governor of Maubeuge, surrendered to General Hans von Zwehl on 7 September, effective at noon the next day.

The French suffered 5,000 casualties and up to 49,000 troops went into captivity, along with several hundred guns and machine-guns; German casualties were 1,100–5,000 men. The garrison had withstood bombardment by heavy and super-heavy artillery, air raids and infantry attacks for fifteen days, longer than any other besieged fortress in Belgium or France, leaving the German 2nd Army short of troops as it pursued the Franco-British armies southwards towards the Marne.

== Background ==
=== 1871–1914 ===
After the Franco-Prussian War of 1870–1871 the French built more fortresses on the German border and extended the frontier fortifications northwards with new building at Hirson, Maubeuge, Lille and Dunkirk. Raymond Adolphe Séré de Rivières oversaw the creation of a ring fortress, le camp retranché de Maubeuge (the Entrenched Camp of Maubeuge) with the construction of six forts and seven intermediate fortifications (ouvrages, fortified shelters). The town walls, 500–600 m (1,600–2,000 ft) in diameter, had been built by Marshal Sébastien de Vauban in the seventeenth century. Forts de Boussois, des Sarts, de Leveau, d'Hautmont, du Bourdiau and Fort de Cerfontaine were built about 3–6 km (1.9–3.7 mi) beyond the city walls, on a circumference of about 32 km (20 mi). The forts were pre-1885 masonry types except for du Bourdiau, which had a concrete shell, capable of resisting some modern heavy artillery.

The masonry forts had a covering of earth 3 m (9.8 ft) thick, except for Le Sarts, which had a clay layer only 50 cm (20 in) thick; the forts made prominent landmarks. ouvrages (fortified infantry shelters) had been built in the wide gaps between the forts, except between Boussois and Le Sarts where two were built. Ouvrage de Rocq in the south-east had an infantry parapet and some masonry shelters, the other ouvrages were low concrete shelters with provision for seating. The forts had no ancillary services like kitchens or first aid posts and water was drawn from a well, which could easily be blocked by artillery fire. The forts contained 80–90 guns which had no overhead cover, making them vulnerable to counter-battery fire, except Boussois and Fort de Cerfontaine, which had two cast iron Menon 155 mm gun turrets and three 75 mm turrets; none of the forts were linked to the citadel.

=== le camp retranché de Maubeuge ===
French forces at the Fortified Camp of Maubeuge: (Note: Data in this section from Glad (2007) pp. 85 and 93–95 unless specified.) (Note: See also the map of the Fortified Camp of Maubeuge and the sectors of the besieging German troops on 2–3 September in Germany's Western Front, Humphries and Maker (2014) p. 447.)

Governor: Brigadier-General Joseph Fournier

- Deputy: Brigadier-General Gabriel Ville

North

- Fort de Leveau (near Feignies)
- Fort des Sarts (near Mairieux)
  - Ouvrage d'Héronfontaine (or Héron-Fontaine near Mairieux)
  - Ouvrage Bersillies (at Bersillies)
  - Ouvrage La Salmagne (near Vieux-Reng)
  - Ouvrage du Faignies (Feignies)

East

- Fort de Boussois (Boussois, Captain Tarubal)
- Fort de Fort de Cerfontaine (Recquignies)
  - Ouvrage de Rocq (Recquignies, Colonel de la Motte)

South

- Fort du Bourdiau (Beaufort)
- Fort d'Hautmont (Hautmont)
  - Ouvrage de Ferrière la Petite (Ferrière-la-Petite)

West

- Ouvrage de Grévaux (Maubeuge)
- Ouvrage de Feignies (Feignies)

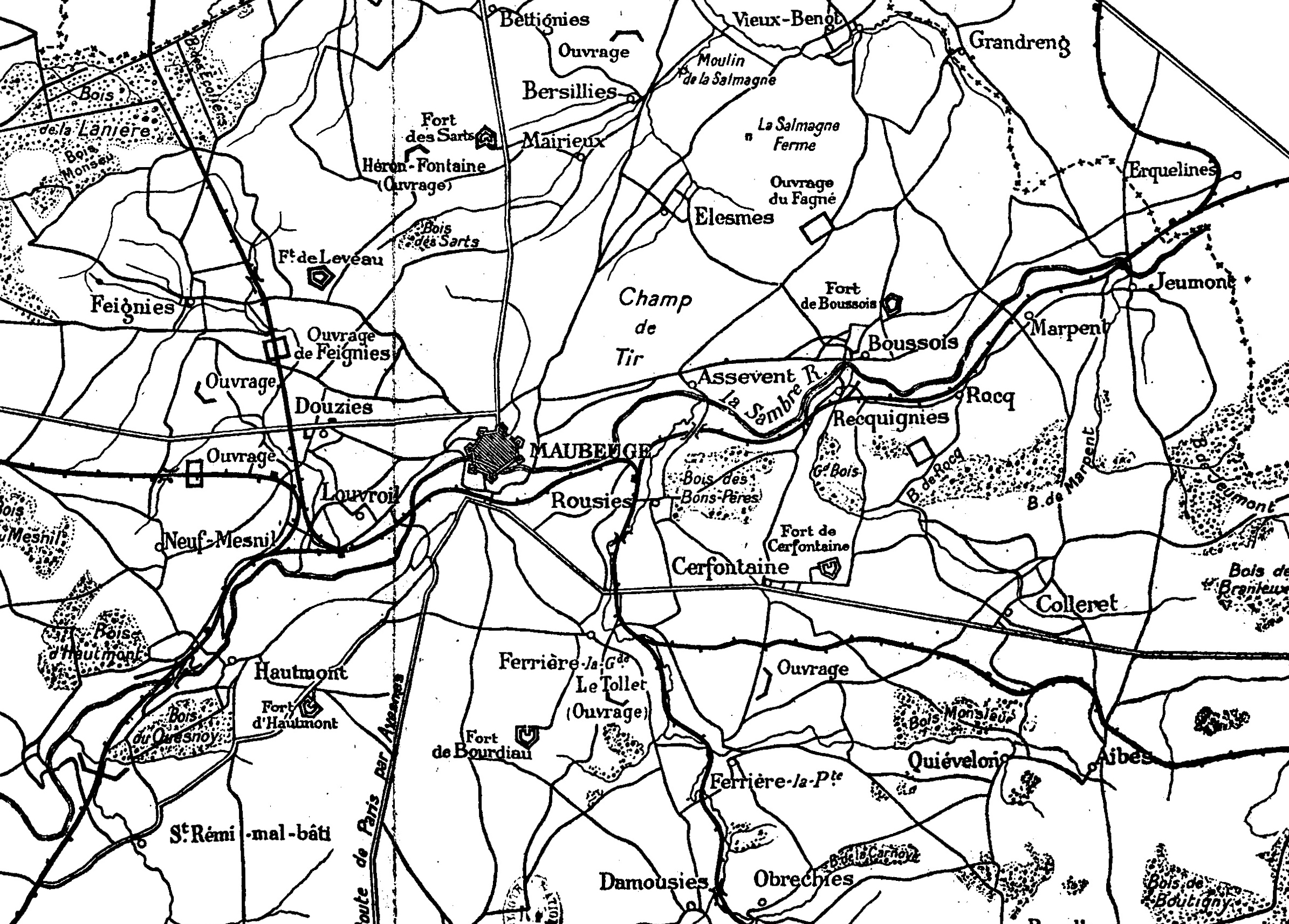
Map showing the Entrenched Camp of Maubeuge in 1914

Brigadier-General Henri Fournier, an engineer, was appointed Governor on 17 March 1914. His inspection revealed that the defences were in a very poor state and he galvanised the garrison to restore the defences, believing that war with Germany was inevitable. The main zone of resistance was given priority, to stop a German advance well outside the town. Work went on round the clock and new positions were built to close the gap between Fort de Boussois and Le Salmagne. Gaps between ouvrages La Salmagne, Bersillies, Gréveaux and ouvrages Ferriére la Petite and de Rocq were blocked by strengthening the existing fortifications. The depth of infantry breastworks was increased to 6 m (20 ft) and new positions were reinforced by tree trunks, 50 mm (2.0 in) steel sheets and overhead cover of 1–5 m (3 ft 3 in – 16 ft 5 in) of earth. Fields of fire were improved by cutting down trees and demolishing houses, much of the village of Élesmes to the north-east of Maubeuge, being levelled.

In three weeks, 1.5 million pickets were driven into the ground for thousands of kilometres of barbed wire, covering 250 acres (100 ha) around the fortifications and intervals. Behind the forts, workers levelled the ground for a narrow-gauge railway to connect the forts and the Maubeuge citadel; in twenty-seven days, 20 km (12 mi) of track was laid. The fortress guns had ranges of only 5–9 km (3.1–5.6 mi) and were brought forward to the perimeter to counter German artillery with a range of up to 14 km (8.7 mi). The artillery had a reserve of 250,000 rounds and dumps of 300 rounds per gun were established. Work began on a reserve position in the eastern sector near Élesmes and Assevent, 2–3 km (1.2–1.9 mi) behind the outer works. The support line from bois Mairieux to bois des Saris, Douzies, the outskirts of Louvroil and bois des Bons Pères, was too close to the forts and ouvrages, vulnerable to being overrun if the main defences fell. There were no fortifications between the support line and the old Vauban ramparts. An advanced position was created in the south-west from bois Hautmont to Quesnoy, close to Hautmont, in the main defensive line.

== Prelude ==
=== French preparations ===
The Maubeuge garrison had been so busy on the defences that by August 1914, the men were exhausted and there had been no time for the Territorials to receive refresher training, despite them having only just received St. Étienne Mle 1907 machine-guns. Fournier planned to fight in the open as well as under cover, since the fortifications would be bombarded. Troops would have to fight in the open to shift machine-guns to threatened points but the reservists had to rely on requisitioned civilian vehicles. The mobile reserve (General VinckelMeyer) comprised the balance of the active and reserve troops of the 145th, 345th, and 31st Colonial regiments, the two squadrons of the 6th Chasseur Regiment and the four mounted 75 mm batteries.

From mid-August, the Maubeuge defences were divided into five sectors; the 1st sector (General Peyrecave) west of the Mons railway to the Sambre with four territorial battalions and a battalion of the 32nd Colonial Regiment in reserve at Douzies. The 2nd sector (Colonel Guérardel) in the south-west from the Sambre to Solre was held by five and a half Territorial battalions, with one battalion of the 3rd Colonial Regiment at Ferriéres la Grande in reserve. The 3rd sector (Colonel de La Motte) from the Solre to the Ouvrage du Feignies was defended by five and a half Territorial battalions and a Customs battalion. The 4th sector (General Ville) from ouvrage du Feignies to Héronfontaine was garrisoned by Five Territorial battalions and a battalion of customs officers. The 5th Sector (Colonel Callan) from Héronfontaine to the Mons railway was defended by one Territorial battalion and a Compagnie de Marche (improvised company) from the 145th Infantry Regiment depot which, also provided a Battaillon de Marche to garrison Maubeuge.

=== Maubeuge ===
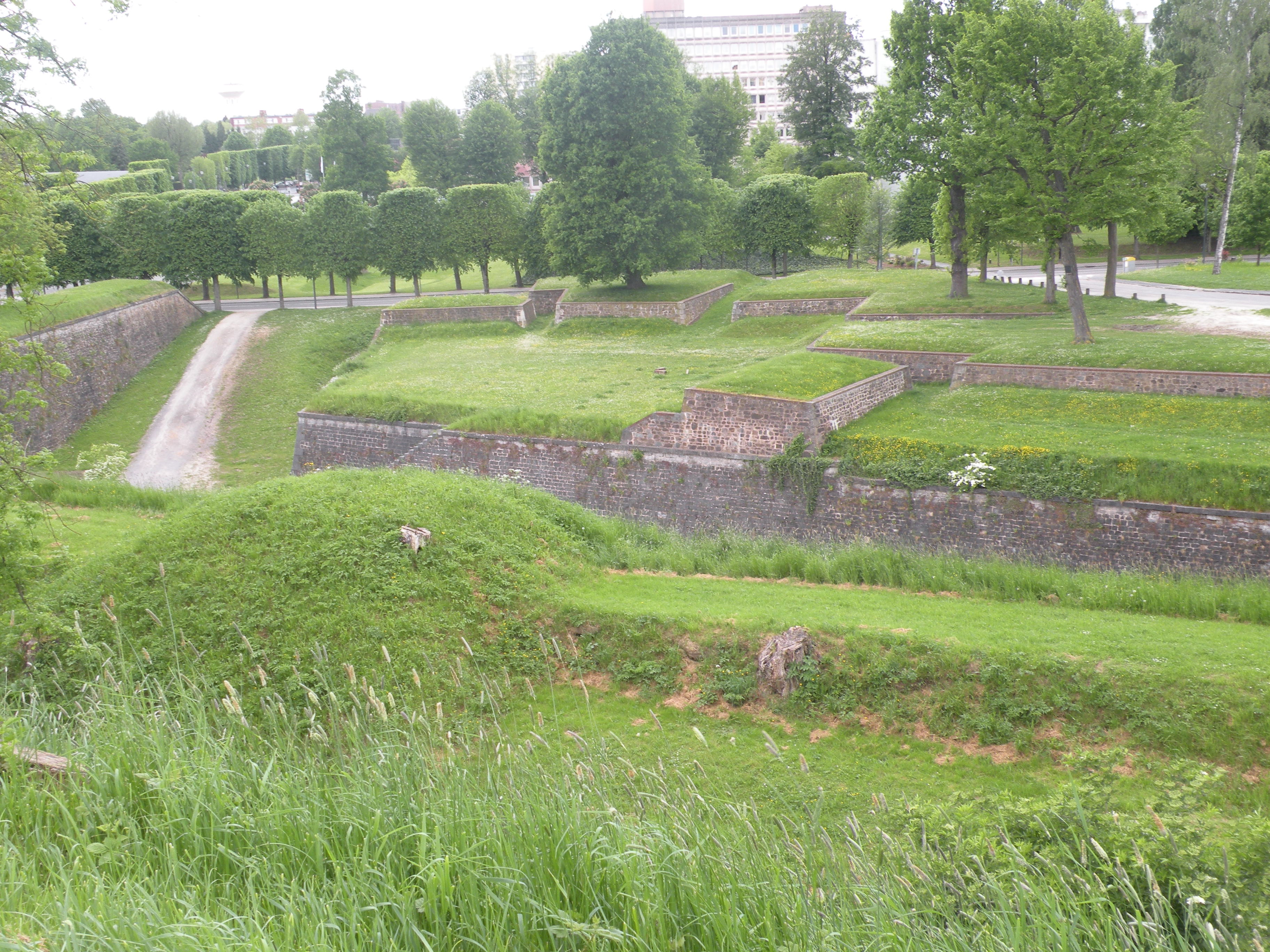
Section of the Citadelle de Maubeuge

On 7 August 1914, Fournier had warned the Minister of War Adolphe Messimy of the lamentable state of the Maubeuge defences and was sacked the next day before General Paul Pau from Grand Quartier Général (GQG, general headquarters) with General George Desaleux and an engineer colonel, had been able to report on the situation. Pau vindicated Fournier, who was reinstated but the confidence of the civilians and the garrison was affected. After enjoying a trade boom created by the arrival of army reservists, the morale of civilians in Maubeuge slumped further when they heard of German atrocities from Belgian refugees. On 15 August, gunfire was heard from the Meuse valley to the east and that evening news of the Battle of Dinant (15–24 August) was followed by reports of a counter-attack by the French 1st Army Corps. On 12 August, Field Marshal Lord Kitchener had predicted a German offensive through Belgium but sent the British Expeditionary Force (BEF) to Maubeuge as planned. The BEF landed in France from 14 to 17 August and assembled from Maubeuge to Le Cateau by 20 August.

Dawn broke misty on 21 August and no air reconnaissance was possible until the afternoon. The BEF began to advance northwards from Maubeuge towards Mons, despite reports from aircrew that a column of German troops "stretched through Louvain as far as the eye could see". At Maubeuge, news arrived of the fall of most of the Fortified Position of Namur in Belgium and placards put up on the town walls ordering preparations for a siege began an exodus of 25,000 civilians. British aircraft arrived on 22 August and the passage of a Scottish regiment raised civilian morale briefly, only to be dashed by reports that German troops had crossed the Sambre at Charleroi. From 17 August, Maubeuge came under the command of General Charles Lanrezac, commander of the Fifth Army and at the Battle of Charleroi (21–23 August) the Fifth Army and the BEF were defeated and forced to retreat. The ministerial instructions of 1910 had envisaged that Maubeuge might stand a short siege while covering the concentration of the field armies, not indefinite isolation after a retreat by the field armies. Lanrezac considered adding the regular and reserve regiments to the Fifth Army but rejected the idea. The Maubeuge garrison cut the rail lines and engineer detachments blew the rail bridges at Jeumont, Berliaumont and Fourmies towards the Belgian frontier.

=== German preparations ===
That the BEF might assemble at Maubeuge was known to the Germans but a concentration at the Channel ports was thought possible. On 21 August, General Karl von Bülow ordered the 1st Army (General Alexander von Kluck) to veer southwards towards Maubeuge. On 24 August, the VII Corps, on the right flank of the 2nd Army, advanced until the 13th Division was stopped by fire from the Maubeuge garrison. On 25 August, the corps was ordered to isolate the south-eastern fringe of the town with the 13th Division and advance against the right flank of the BEF, south of Maubeuge towards Aulnoye with the rest of the corps. German air reconnaissance revealed the beginning of a French general retreat towards Verdun, Mézières and Maubeuge. The 14th Division of the VII Reserve Corps, was ordered south to Binche to join the IX and VII Corps to surround Maubeuge and the BEF; late in the afternoon it was found that the BEF had escaped. Bulow made General Karl von Einem responsible for the investment of Maubeuge, with the VII Corps (less the 14th Division), VII Reserve Corps (less the 13th Reserve Division), IX Corps and the artillery and siege units released by the end of the Siege of Namur.

The German 2nd Army bypassed Maubeuge to the east and the Entrenched Camp was surrounded on 26 August. On 27 August, General der Infanterie Hans von Zwehl (VII Reserve Corps) was ordered to conduct the siege with the 17th Division of IX Corps; the 13th Reserve Division (General der Kavallerie Alfred von Kühne) was diverted to Maubeuge and VII Corps was ordered south, less one brigade. Zwehl planned to attack the fortress from the north-east, with a secondary attack from south of the Sambre. Three sectors were established, one from the Trouille stream to the Sambre below Maubeuge, the second from the Sambre to the Solre brook and the third sector from the Solre to the Sambre north of the fortifications. A regiment of cavalry was to cover the gap to the west and north. The 21 heavy Austrian 305 mm howitzer and super-heavy German 420 mm Gamma Mörser batteries from Namur were to be deployed between Givry and Solre. By 2 September, the 27th Reserve Infantry Brigade had taken over the first sector, the 26th Infantry Brigade held the southern sector and elements of the 13th Reserve Division held a new fourth sector to the west around Bavay.

== Siege ==
=== 24–28 August ===
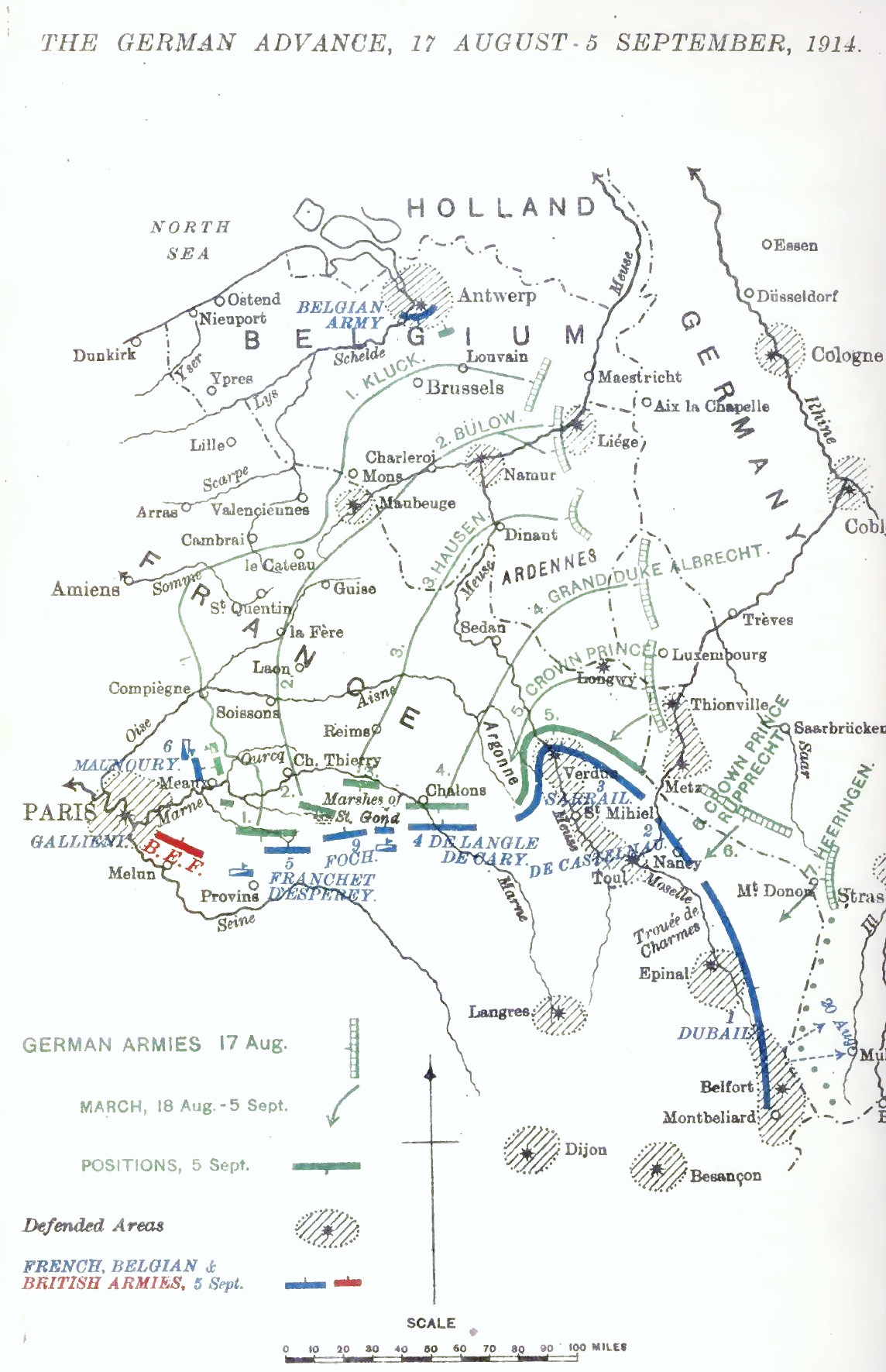
Map showing the fortified positions of Liège, Namur and Maubeuge along the Meuse and Sambre rivers and the German advance to the south and south-west, 17 August – 5 September 1914

From 24 August, Fournier received information from spies on the German advance and planned a reconnaissance in force north of Maubeuge, to discover German intentions, harass the besiegers and give his troops more experience. On 25 August, the garrison reserve advanced towards Quévy and Havay over the Belgian border and engineers cut the narrow-gauge railway along the frontier. On 26 August, the 145th Infantry Regiment, two batteries of 75 mm field guns and a cavalry squadron sortied towards La Longueville to reconnoitre German forces that had been reported there. Skirmishing took place with German patrols and late in the afternoon the rumble of artillery was heard to the west, which raised hopes that the siege would be lifted but after two days the sounds died away.

By 27 August, Maubeuge had been surrounded and the fortress artillery began speculative bombardments on crossroads and other likely targets, which had little effect beyond revealing the positions of the guns to German observers. On 28 August, the garrison reserve sallied towards the south and an inconclusive skirmish was fought beyond bois Leroy, which prevented the French from reconnoitring German positions. None of the expeditions pushed to sufficient depth and none were directed to the east towards the principal threat. The German siege artillery between the Sambre and La Trouille at Solre sur Sambre, Peissant, Fauroeulx, Haulchies, Givry, had completed its preparations, screened by infantry from Grand-Reng to Erquelines.

=== 29 August ===
At 1:00 p.m. the German bombardment commenced on Fort de Boussois, Ouvrage du Faignies, Salmagne and Bersillies. Inside the Entrenched Camp the Germans had many spies who reported on the fall of shot and spread alarmist rumours. (Note: Before the war, Maubeuge was home to many non-French nationals and it had been impossible to expel all suspicious individuals.) The bombardment by 210 mm, 280 mm and 305 mm howitzers (420 mm from 2 September) began to spread to Fort de Cerfontaine and Fort des Sarts. Maubeuge town was bombarded by 120 mm guns; the Porte de France district was severely damaged and fire brigade fought fires amidst the bombardment, suffering many casualties but civilians and refugees found safety by sheltering in cellars. Faubourg de Sous le Bois, occupied by the general reserve and faubourg de Louvroil, with numerous encampments, were severely bombarded; water and gas mains were cut and telephone wires brought down. The German siege gunners concentrated on the permanent fortifications and the recent improvised positions. Ouvrages were damaged and the occupants risked asphyxiation from gases released by the shell explosions; Fort de Boussois was demolished and the roof of the Menon turret was blown off. The interval positions were destroyed and an ammunition dump was hit by an Austrian 305 mm shell; the walls collapsed and sixty French troops were asphyxiated. Fournier attempted to reply to the German bombardment but the artillery in the sectors not being attacked could not be moved for lack of transport. Guns from the general reserve were moved between Fort de Cerfontaine and Fort des Sarts but the guns were destroyed one by one. The Territorial troops in the front line were aghast at the effect of the German artillery and some units panicked.

=== 30–31 August ===
After a shell explosion, the commander of Fort de Boussois was evacuated with shell shock; during the night of 31/31 August, the morale of the garrison collapsed and the men fled to Maubeuge, some claiming that the fort had been captured. Had the Germans realised that Fort de Boussois was undefended and rushed in, the remaining defences of the Entrenched Position would have become untenable. Fournier sent immediately a battalion of the 145th Infantry Regiment to reoccupy Fort de Boussois, which managed to reoccupy the fort before the Germans realised. On 31 August, Fournier appointed Captain Tarubal, an engineer officer, to hold Fort de Boussois with the 11th Company of Territorial Engineers. Fournier had received information from civilians that the German siege guns had been established in the Erquelines quarries and behind the villages of Grand Reng, Vieux Reng and Rouveroy. A big sortie by the general reserve was planned to destroy the German batteries. Fournier ordered that two Territorial battalions were to cover the flanks of the general reserve, one facing Villers Sire Nicole and the other south of the Sambre towards Ferme Watissart. Two columns were to advance in the centre, the 31st Colonial Infantry Regiment on Vieux Reng and the 145th Infantry Regiment on the Erquelines sand quarries. The commander of the reserve passed on the orders from Fournier but neglected to nominate an axis of advance, which led to uncoordinated attacks and in the rush there was insufficient liaison between the infantry and the fortress artillery.

=== 1–2 September ===
The 31st Colonial Infantry Regiment advanced quickly into a deluge of artillery and machine-gun fire and reached the fringe of Vieux Reng. Units moving up in support joined the survivors but they were pinned down by machine-gun fire from the houses. Germans were rushed to the threatened area and eventually the French were forced to retreat. The 345th Reserve Infantry Regiment attacked as the Colonials retreated but was also pushed back, ending the attack on the left flank. On the right flank, the 145th Infantry Regiment failed to get across the Vieux Reng–Marpent road. The commanders of the columns ordered a general retreat, the sortie being a bloody failure. The German artillery firing on the French attackers resumed the bombardment of the fortifications and the town. A huge bombardment began on the defences of the third sector from Fort de Cerfontaine to the Sambre. At Fort de Cerfontaine a 420 mm shell pierced the earth cover and detonated in a shelter where sixty troops had just taken cover. The men not killed by falling masonry were choked by the exhaust gases of the exploding shell.

The German bombardment on Fort de Boussois and La Salmagne soon smashed the artillery and infantry positions. Fournier ordered the garrisons to evacuate the forts and take cover in the trenches dug in the intervals, which were less vulnerable. Parties of German troops probed the French defences at ouvrages La Salmagne and du Fagné but were engaged with artillery and small arms fire and retired to Vieux Reng and Grand Reng. Fournier ordered the bulk of the artillery on the outer perimeter to be withdrawn to the reserve position. South of the Sambre, artillery was to retire to bois des Bons Pères, in case the Germans gained a foothold between Fort de Boussois and Le Fagné north of the Sambre and attacked the citadel. The batteries of the fortress reserve and those at Épinettes were ordered south of Élesmes to defend the support line but lack of transport meant that the artillery was not moved in time.

=== 3–4 September ===
The weight of the German bombardment increased on the north-east quadrant of the entrenched camp, from Fort des Sarts to Fort de Boussois, breaking the will of some of the defenders. Fournier expected the Germans to make their main effort north of the Sambre from the east, with a smaller effort south of the river between Rocq and Fort de Cerfontaine. Fournier reorganised the defence by the expanding the Maubeuge sector along the Sambre on the right flank and to the defences between Héronfontaine and the Mons railway to the north. The general reserve was moved into the fourth sector, the 145th Infantry Regiment taking over the defence of the villages of Assevent and Élesmes, the 345th Reserve Infantry Regiment in the gap between. The 31st Colonial Regiment and the march battalion from the 145th Regiment depot, took over to the west of the Champ de Tir (Field of Fire) a triangle of ground north of the Sambre, eastwards from Maubeuge to Fort Boussois along the Sambre and Élesmes to the north-west. A third defence line to be held for as long as possible was dug hastily. The 75 mm field batteries of the general reserve were moved between Assevent and the Mons road. Ville, lacking a staff, improvised a headquarters at the Assevent crossroads with only an ordnance officer to assist him.

At Fort des Sarts, the garrison withstood bombardment by 150 mm artillery but from 1:30 p.m., the Germans brought 420 mm howitzers into action, penetrating the 50 cm (20 in) of clay cover and smashing its casemates. At about 3:00 p.m. most of the garrison deserted and retreated Maubeuge. During the evening, the last defenders withdrew and the gunners, lacking explosives, retreated with the breech blocks of their guns. Troops occupying farms and other positions in the vicinity stood their ground but the garrison of Ouvrage du Fagné also abandoned their post. German troops following up the French retreat took over the ouvrage but the attack the Ouvrage La Salmagne (Captain Eliet) failed. The German infantry retreated to Vieux Reng and Grand Reng. To the south-east, ferme de la Salmagne was captured; at Fort de Boussois every attack was repulsed. With the defensive perimeter breached, Fournier called a council of war that evening for opinion on whether to fight to the end at Maubeuge or to attempt a break-out towards Quesnoy and Arras. The participants were unanimous in wanting to prolong the resistance of the Entrenched Camp for as long as possible. At 5:00 p.m. the colours of the garrison units were collected at caserne Joyeuse (Joyeuse Barracks) to be burned the next morning.

=== 5 September ===
The bombardment continued unabated and Colonel Vasudevan, the commander at ouvrages Bersillies and La Salmagne, ordered the evacuation of the defences except at Ouvrage La Salmagne. At 4:00 p.m. German troops occupied Bersillies and encircled Ouvrage La Salmagne. The garrison was eventually overrun, only 51 men surviving to be taken prisoner. In the valley of the Sambre, the defenders of Fort la Boussois repulsed German attacks, barring the Jeumont–Maubeuge road. Ville ordered a retirement from the rest of the perimeter defences in the area; All the rest of the point of support was evacuated by order of the General in the city, who understood how much his garrison was venturing. South of the Sambre, the artillery around Ouvrage de Rocq was demolished by the German heavy howitzers. By evening, most of the Fourth Sector had been captured and Ville rallied the defenders on the support position from Élesmes, northwards to Mairieux and the 31st Colonial Regiment relieved the 145th Infantry Regiment, which took over the third line at Pont Allant. The German bombardment on Maubeuge led the mayor to get permission from Fournier to evacuate the civilians to Hautmont. The Fort du Boussois garrison was still holding out but morale had collapsed among some of the defenders.

=== 6 September ===
South of the Sambre in the Third Sector, Recquignies was attacked from the north and part was captured the attackers also penetrated west of Ouvrage de Rocq. Already under a frontal attack and vulnerable to being encircled, the garrison retreated quickly, having time only to destroy its ammunition. Motte attempted to improvise another defensive position from Bois des Bons Péres to Fort de Cerfontaine. The German bombardment increased in severity; Fort de Cerfontaine was evacuated and the French position collapsed. Motte managed to hold the line of the Solre stream, with the left flank resting on the Sambre and the right on Ouvrage de Ferrière la Petite. As night fell, Motte rallied scattered parties of troops to continue resistance. North of the Sambre, the Mairieux––Élesmes line was overrun and Ville tried to hold a line from Saris to Grandcamp and Petitcamp. Ville then ordered a retirement to reorganise and hold a line from the Mons road crossroads to Le Sarts and Bois des Sarts to Ouvrage d'Héronfontaine.

Maubeuge came under increased bombardment and the Porte de France district caught fire, the flames rising high into the sky, shell explosions mingling with the sound of small-arms fire. Behind the remaining defensive positions, long columns of civilians and deserters fled south-west towards Hautmont. The village was already full of refugees and a huge throng of people built up. Fournier stayed in Maubeuge as reports came in showing that the defence of Maubeuge was collapsing. By 6:00 p.m. it was clear that half of the defences had fallen. Fournier called another council of war at which the participants stated that fighting on for a few more hours would be a useless sacrifice of lives. Fournier refused to contemplate surrender and sent orders to Ville that the remaining defenders were to retire during the night to a position from the Maubeuge walls at Faubourg St Guillain, north-west to Fort de Leveau.

=== 7 September ===
The bombardment during the night of 6/7 September reached a new level of intensity. The general reserve was down to six companies of the 145th Infantry Regiment and five of the 345th Reserve Infantry Regiment, west of the Leveau–Maubeuge road. The infantry were covered by two batteries of 75 mm field guns, in the petit bois de Douzies to the west of Maubeuge and the artillery of Fort de Leveau to the north, the defenders prepared for a German attack next morning. From 5:00 to 11:00 a.m. Ouvrage d'Héronfontaine, north of Maubeuge up the Mons road and north-east of Fort de Leveau was bombarded by 305 mm and 420 mm howitzers, which forced the defenders to evacuate. German infantry, exploiting natural cover, got into Bois des Sarts behind the ouvrage and the defenders had to retreat to the west. The German super-heavy guns switched to Fort de Leveau and after thirty minutes, the garrison retreated. The rest of the sector was shelled by German medium artillery which knocked out most of the French guns. The left flank of the French defence line began to buckle and the troops in Ouvrage de Feignies were forced out, leaving exposed the centre of defences improvised by Ville northwards from Maubeuge. South of the Sambre, Austrian 305 mm howitzers bombarded Ouvrage de Ferriére la Petite and Fort du Bourdiau from behind, quickly making them untenable and endangering the right flank of the line behind the Solre.

Reports of the collapse soon reached Fournier and that only half the infantry was left, its spirit broken; the French guns had all been knocked out and d'Hautmont was the last fort under French control. Fournier realised that Maubeuge was doomed and that an attempt to delay the Germans on the south side of the Sambre would quickly be forced back on the village of Hautmont, which was thronged with thousands of refugees. Fournier decided to open negotiations to play for time and hold out until the night of 8 September if possible. Just before noon, Fournier sent Captain Grenier to Zwehl, carrying a letter asking for a 24-hour truce, to bury the dead and discuss surrender terms. Zwehl gave Grenier four hours to return to Fournier and continued the attack. While Grenier had been on his way to Zwehl, Fournier had raised a white flag on the Maubeuge church tower and Brigadier Rene de PeyreCave had the signal repeated in the first sector. Troops began to lay down their arms and 1,000 to 1,500 of the defenders managed to slip away to the west and reach safety.

Isolated near le Douzies, Ville saw German troops 200–300 m (660–980 ft) away and to honour the truce ordered his troops to cease-fire. General Neuhaus and a party of German cavalry attempted to take Ville prisoner but he objected because Fournier was still negotiating, as could be seen by the white flag over Maubeuge. Neuhaus concluded a local agreement that the French would stay in their positions on either side of the Le Douzies–Hautmont road. Soon afterwards a German parlementaire took Ville to General Andreas von Harbou at Fort de Laveau where he was shown twelve 77 mm field guns and given a ten-minute ultimatum they would open fire unless he surrendered. Ville could see that his soldiers had ceased hostilities and that most were unarmed, with no more artillery; Ville surrendered the Fourth Sector to prevent more bloodshed. When Grenier returned to Fournier, he bowed to the inevitable and sent Grenier back with his surrender of the Entrenched Camp of Maubeuge, to take effect at noon on 8 September.

== Aftermath ==
=== Analysis ===
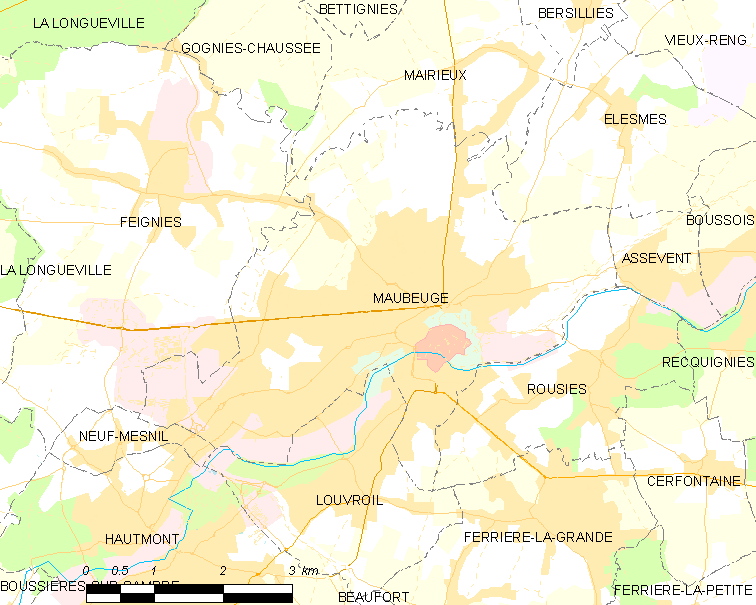
Modern map of Maubeuge and vicinity (commune FR insee code 59392)

In 2007, Jean Glad wrote that the length of the siege deprived the German 1st Army and the 2nd Army of troops, adding to their difficulties as they pursued the retreating Franco-British towards the Marne. The siege was primarily an artillery operation, in which the infantry of the VII Reserve Corps followed up French retirements caused by the destructive effects of the German super-heavy artillery. Fournier might have delayed the opening of the German bombardment by occupying advanced positions beyond the eastern perimeter but lack of troops and their inexperience led Fournier to fear that they might collapse when the Germans attacked and leave the way clear to the town.

In the first weeks of the German invasion, much of the rail network in Belgium and northern France had been closed by Belgian and French demolitions before the Germans arrived. Only the single line from Trier to Liège, Brussels, Valenciennes and Cambrai remained available to supply the German armies in the north. A maximum of forty trains a day could be run, which meant that the transport of one corps took four days. During the siege, the Diedenhofen (Thionville), Luxembourg into Belgium and France was closed until the rail bridge at Namur was repaired but even then German forces in Belgium had to forage for food.

=== Casualties ===
In Principal Events, 1914–1918 (1922) British official historians recorded that 40,000 French soldiers were taken prisoner during the siege of Maubeuge. Hew Strachan in 2003 wrote that 600 guns were captured by the Germans and in a 2004 web article, Didier Lodier wrote that 1,300 French troops had been killed and 45,000 men (including 3,000 wounded) were captured along with 400 guns (most damaged) for 2,500 German casualties. In 2009, Holger Herwig wrote that the Germans took 32,692 prisoners and 450 guns when Maubeuge was surrendered on 6 September; the Germans suffered 1,100 casualties.

=== Subsequent operations ===
On 9 November 1918, Maubeuge was re-taken by the British Guards Division and 62nd (West Riding) Division.

=== Maubeuge Garrison ===
The ration strength of the garrison and support services was 1,000 officers and 48,000 men, including 33,000 infantry (22,000 Territorial) with enough supplies for a siege of at least three months. Data in this section from Lodier (2004).

Maubeuge fortress artillery
Calibre	Range (m)	No
80 mm	7,000	34
90 mm	7,000	155
95 mm	7,000	50
120 mm gun	9,000	111
155 mm gun	9,000	48
120 mm howitzer	5,000	12
155 mm howitzer	6,000	13
220 mm mortar	5,000	12
Total		435

Infantry

- 145th Infantry Regiment (active army, Général de Brigade Winckel-Meyer)
- 345th Reserve Infantry Regiment (reserve duplicate of the 145th IR)
  - Two march (improvised) battalions from the depot of the 145th–345th Reserve Regiment
- 31st Colonial Infantry Regiment
- 32nd Colonial Infantry Regiment
- 1st, 2nd, 3rd and 4th Territorial Regiments
- 85th Territorial Regiment (two battalions)
- Customs Officials (two battalions)
- 1,000 Gardes des Voies de Communication (GVC, Railway Guard)
- Mobile artillery
  - 4 Mounted territorial 75 mm Field Gun batteries
  - Mobile artillery reserve (69 guns)

Cavalry

- 6th Chasseurs à Cheval (2 reserve squadrons)

Engineers

- 7 Companies

Others

- Wireless station
- Pigeon section
- Hospitals (capacity 3,000)

== Gallery ==
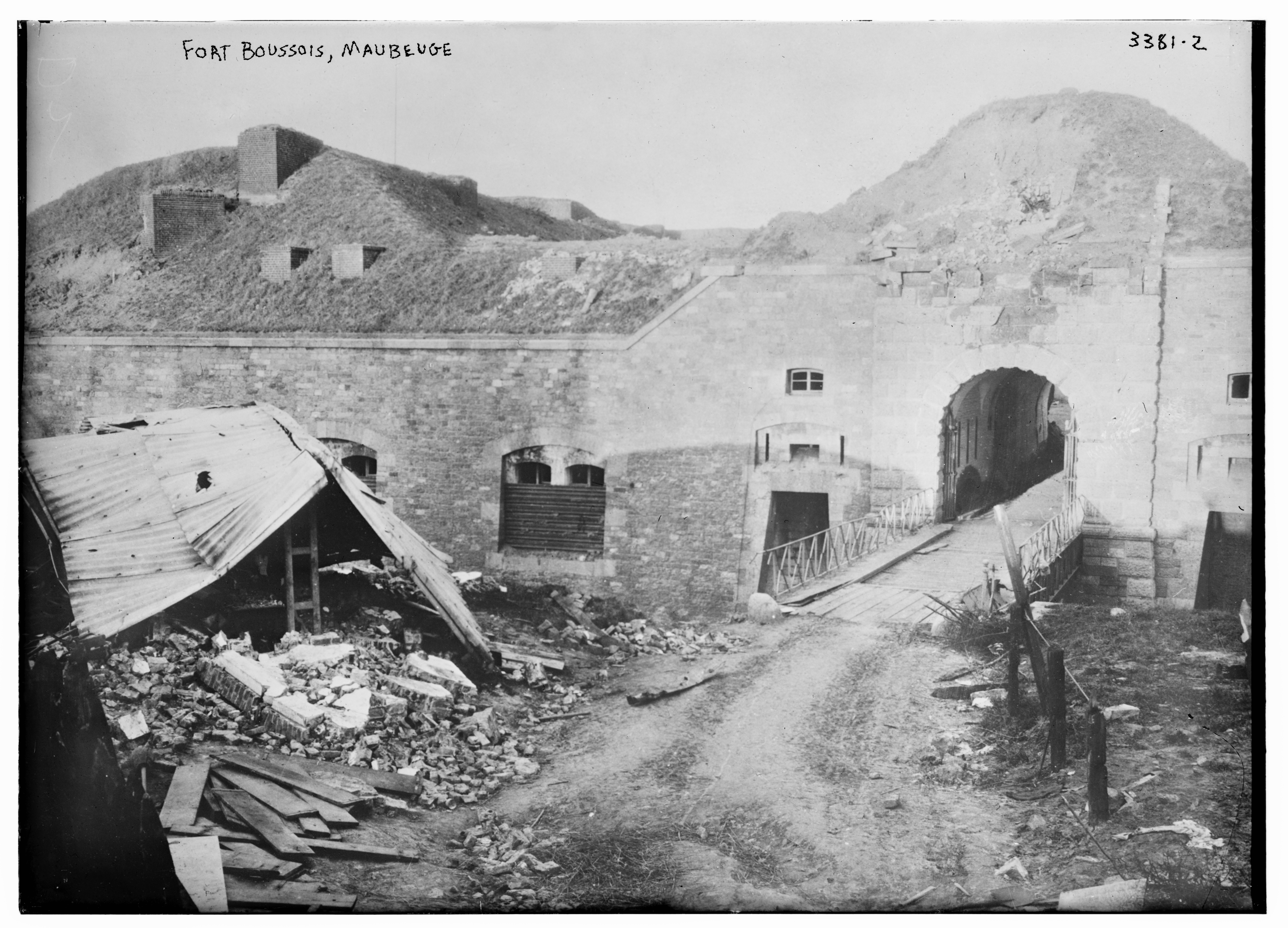
Fort Boussois, Maubeuge, 1914 (LCCN2014698431)

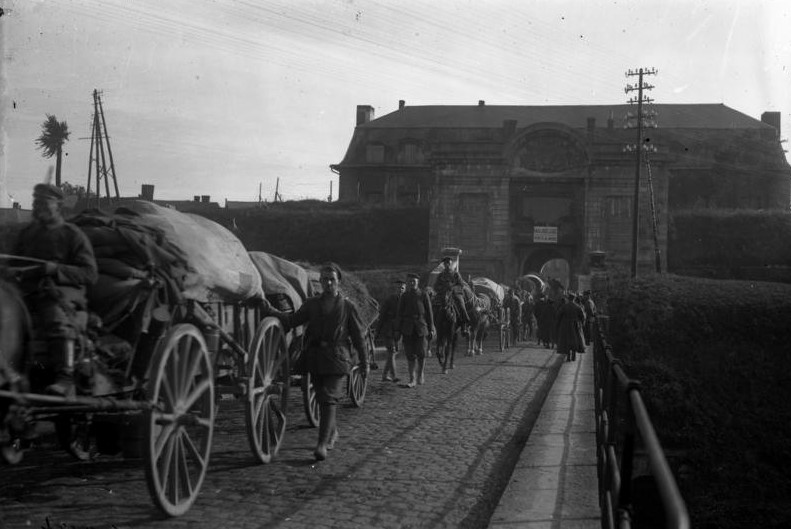
German soldiers outside Maubeuge, September 1914

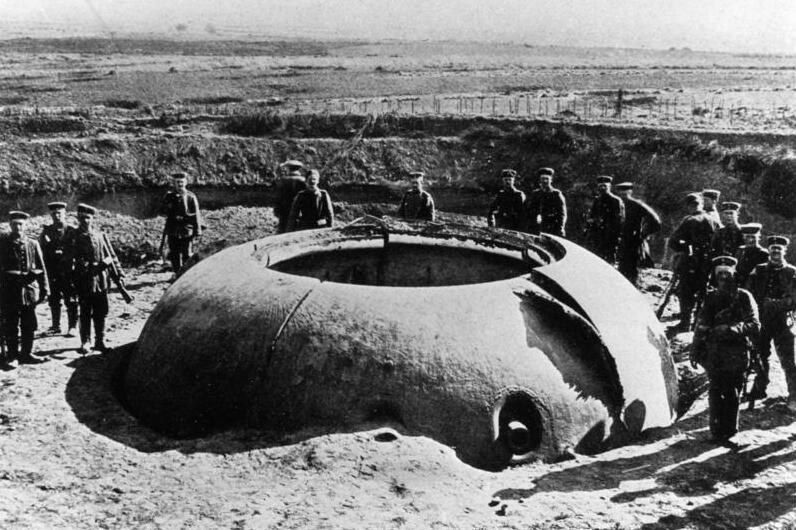
Fortress Maubeuge on 7 September 1914

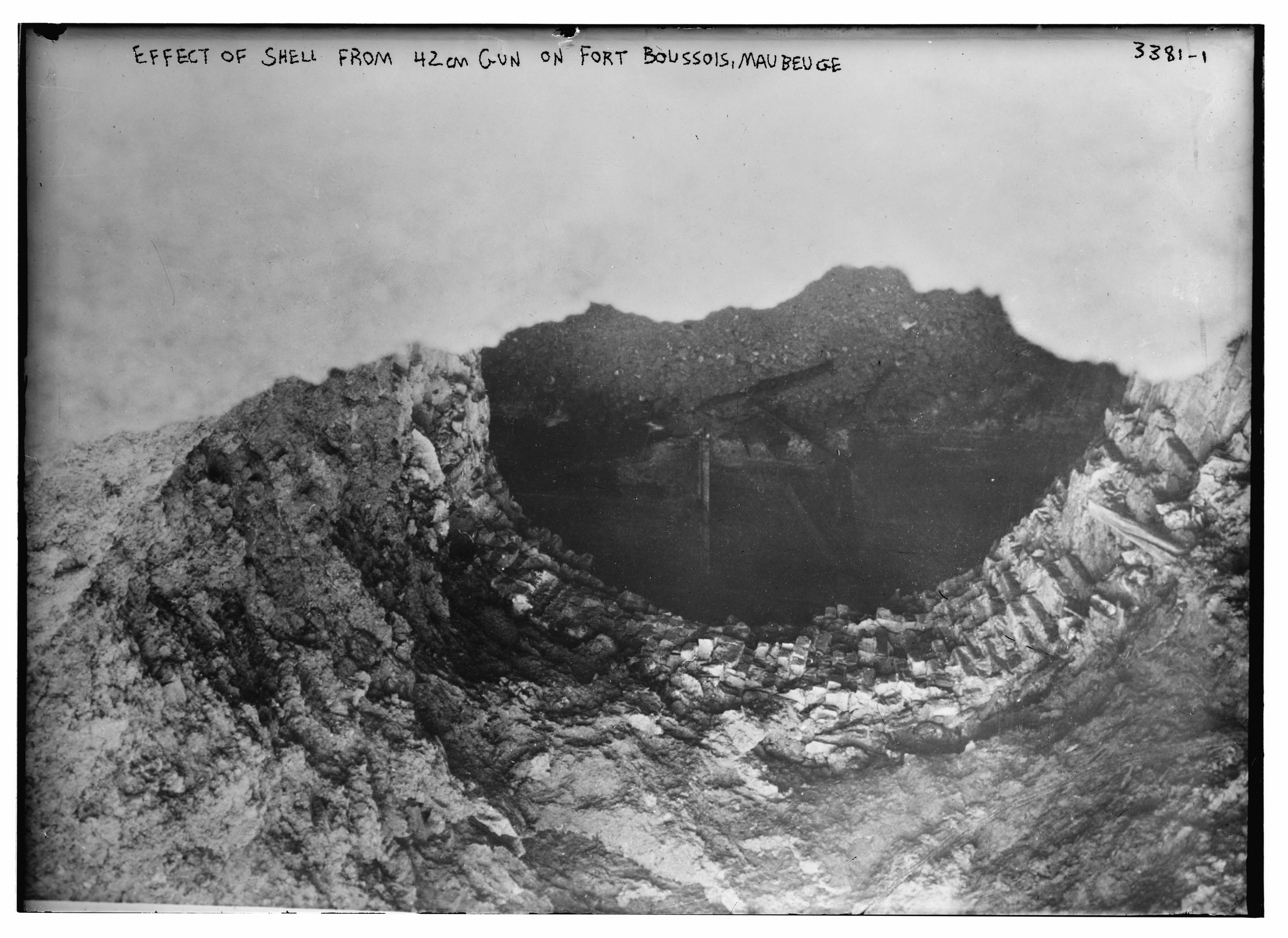
Effect of shell from 420 mm gun on Fort Boussois, Maubeuge, 1914 (LCCN2014698430)

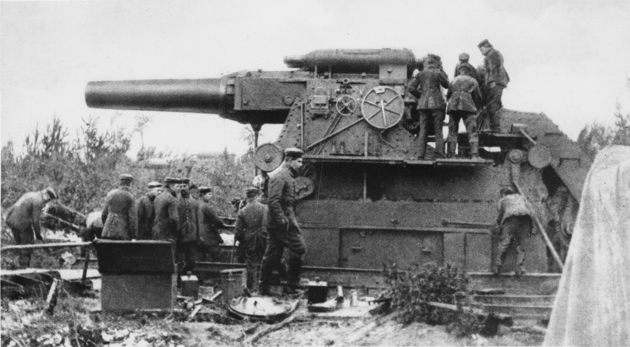
German 420 mm Gamma Mörser with crew, Belgium, 1914

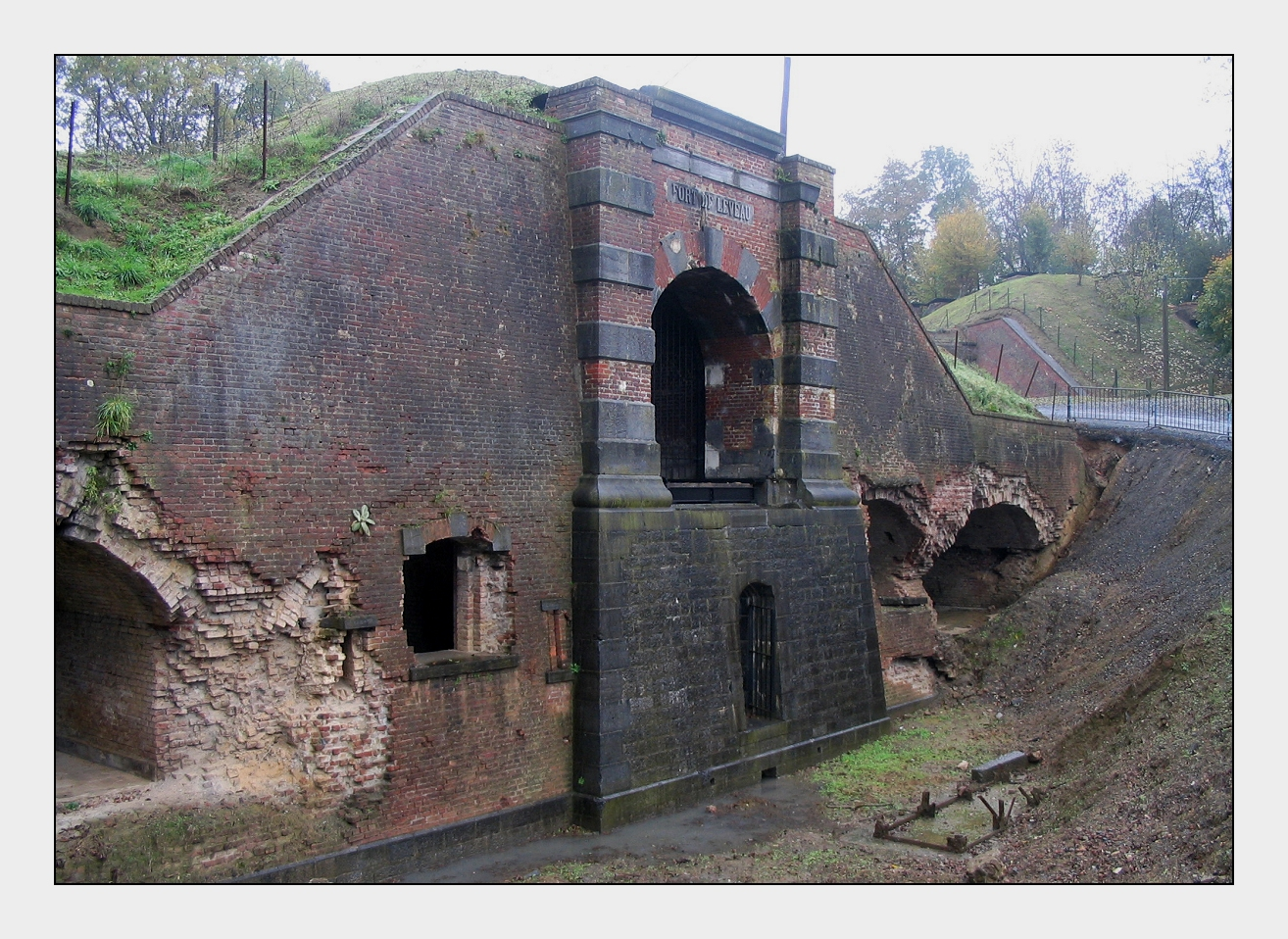
Entrance to Fort de Leveau, Maubeuge, 2012

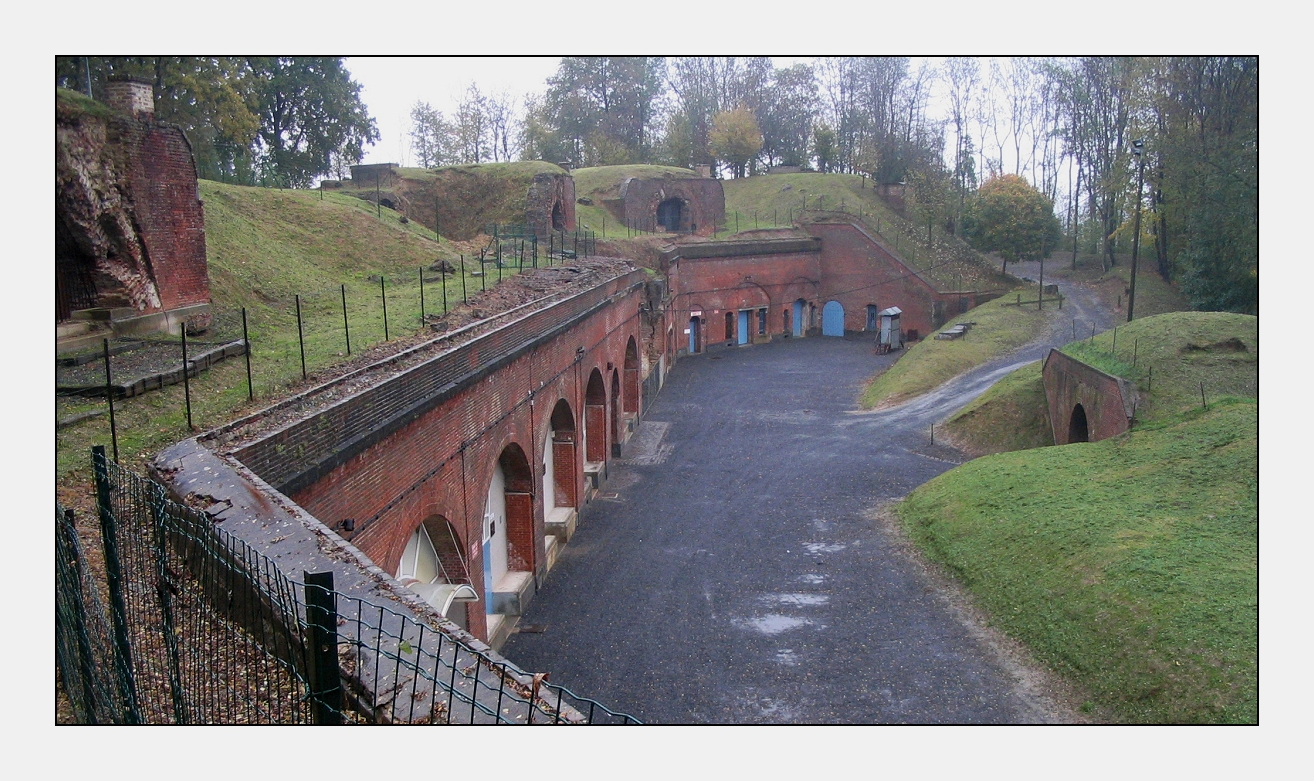
Interior of Fort de Leveau, 2012

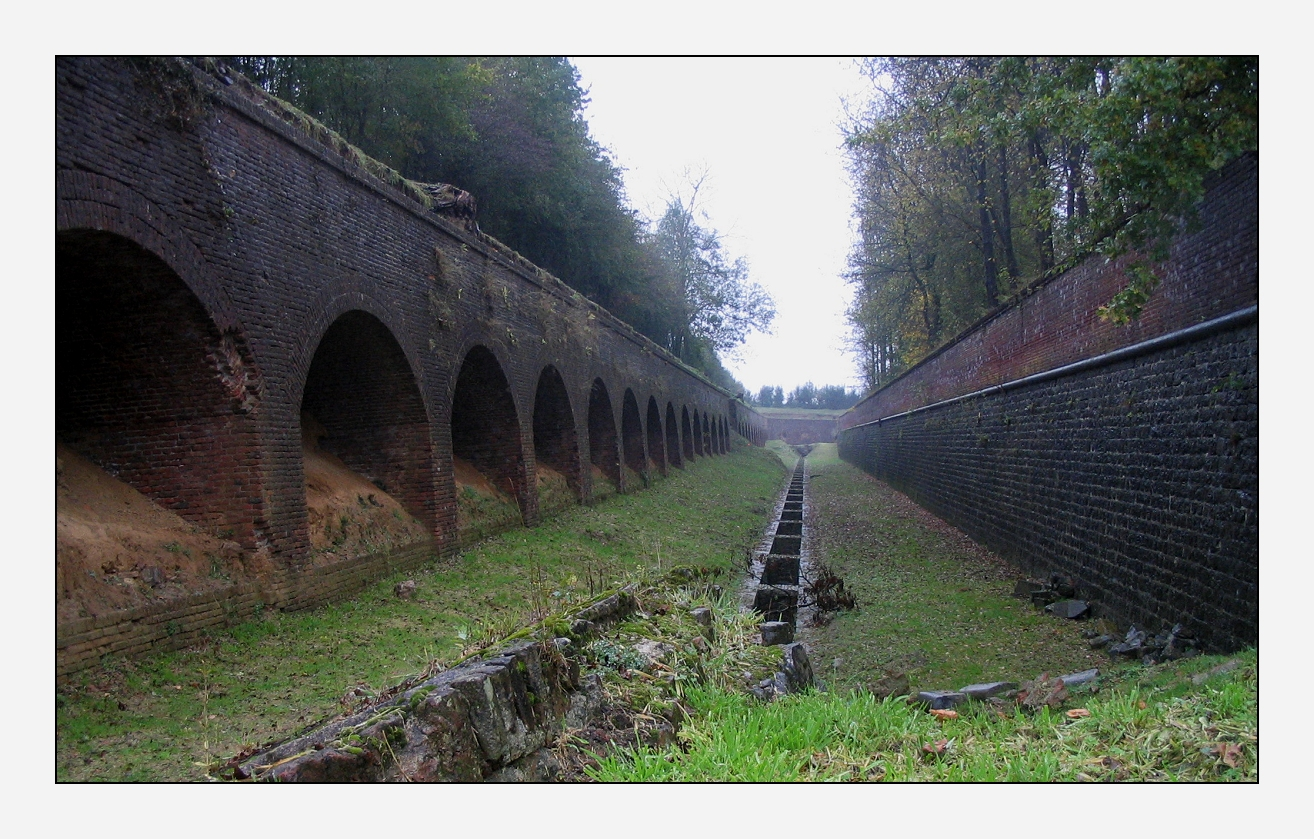
Dry moat, Fort de Leveau

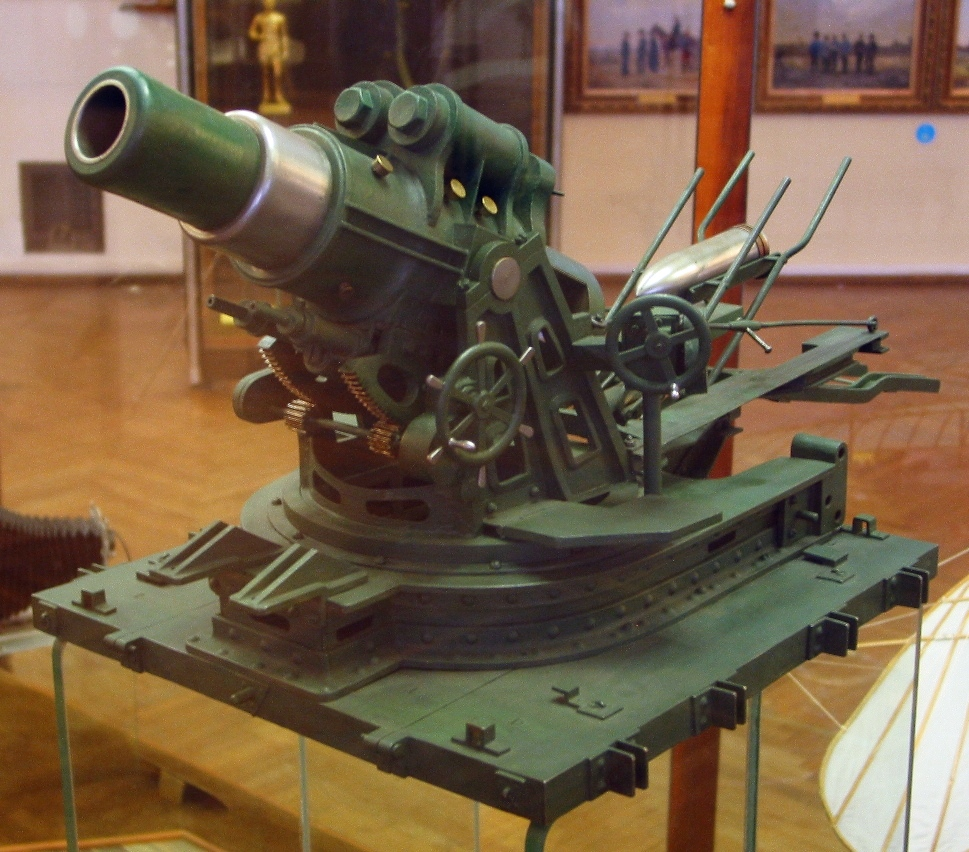
Model of a Skoda 305 mm Mörser M1911
