= Villers-Campeau =

French commune

Coordinates: 50°22′N 3°17′E

Villers-Campeau is a former commune in the Nord department in northern France, absorbed in 1947 into Somain.

== Heraldry ==
Arms of Villers-Campeau	The arms of Villers-Campeau are blazoned : Barry argent and azure. (Boussois, Noyelles-sur-Escaut and Villers-Campeau use the same arms.)

== See also ==
- Communes of the Nord department
