= Bousignies-sur-Roc =

- Commune
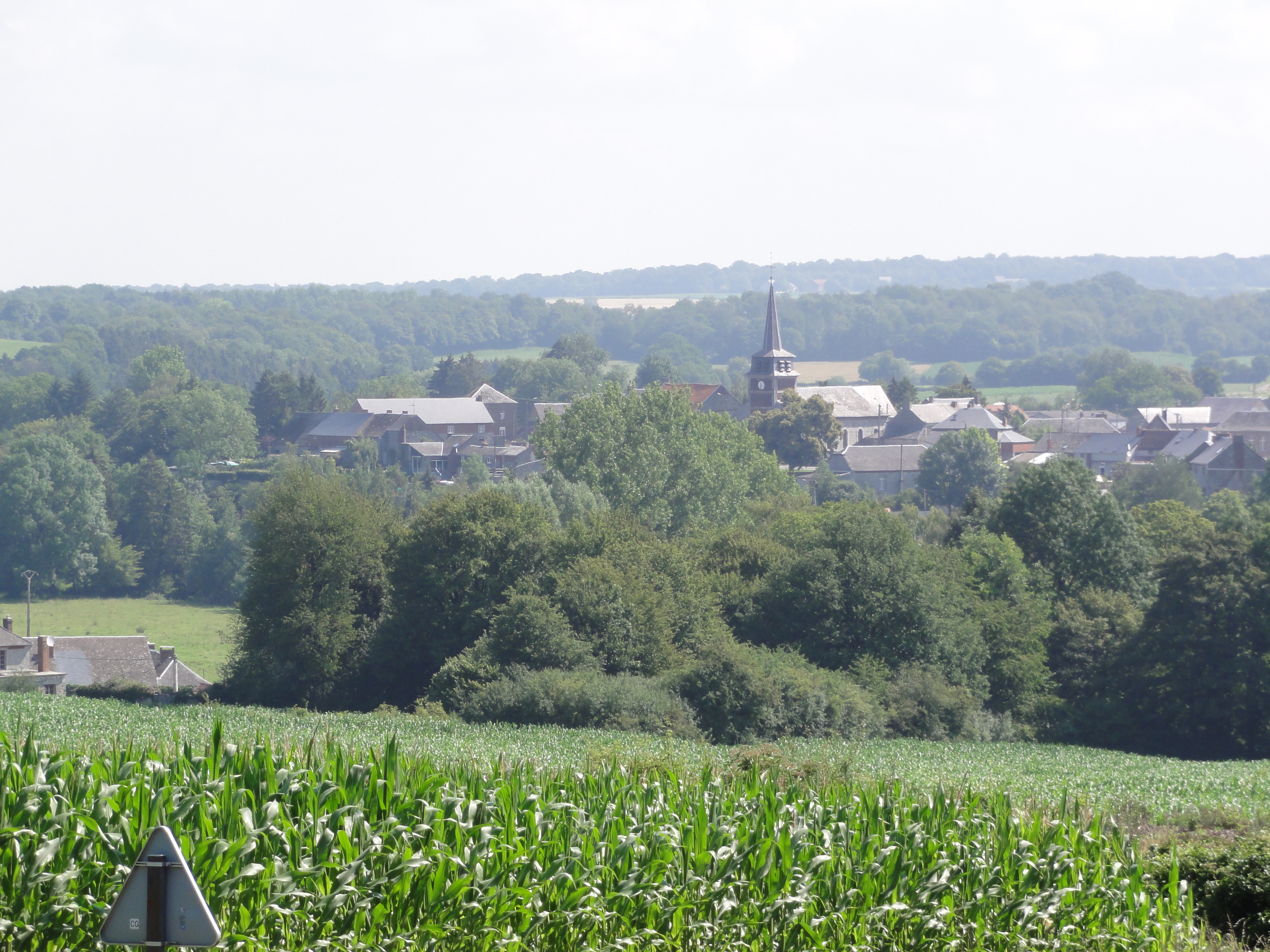
- A general view of Bousignies-sur-Roc
- Location of Bousignies-sur-Roc
- Location within France Location within Hauts-de-France
- Coordinates: 50°15′51″N 4°10′58″E
- Country: France
- Region: Hauts-de-France
- Department: Nord
- Arrondissement: Avesnes-sur-Helpe
- Canton: Fourmies
- Intercommunality: CA Maubeuge Val de Sambre

Government
  - Mayor (2020–2026): Aurélie Welonek
- Area^{1}: 12.14 km^{2} (4.69 sq mi)
- Elevation: 160 m (520 ft)
- Highest elevation: 224 m (735 ft)
- Lowest elevation: 130 m (430 ft)
- Population (2023): 369
  - Density: 30.4/km^{2} (78.7/sq mi)
- Time zone: UTC+01:00 (CET)
  - Summer (DST): UTC+02:00 (CEST)
- INSEE/Postal code: 59101 /59149
- ^{1} French Land Register data, which excludes lakes, ponds, glaciers > 1 km^{2} (0.386 sq mi or 247 acres) and river estuaries.

Bousignies-sur-Roc (French pronunciation: [buziɲi syʁ ʁɔk]) is a commune in the Nord department in northern France.

In early 2021, the commune made international headlines after some historians on a walk noticed that a stone marking the French-Belgian border near the village was moved by about two meters into the French territory. Internationally, it was initially reported that the stone was moved by a Belgian farmer who was frustrated about the stone blocking the path of his tractor. However, the owner of the area that encompasses the stone, David Lavaux, is a veterinarian who claims that he never moved the stone. As of June 2021, it was discovered that the stone has not been moved back since the initial report.

== Population ==
Historical population
Year	Pop.	±% p.a.
1968	526	—
1975	531	+0.14%
1982	503	−0.77%
1990	401	−2.79%
1999	410	+0.25%
2007	398	−0.37%
2012	434	+1.75%
2017	402	−1.52%
2023	369	−1.42%
Source: INSEE

== See also ==
- Communes of the Nord department
