= Canton of Maubeuge =

Coordinates: 50.28°N 3.97°E

The canton of Maubeuge is an administrative division of the Nord department, northern France. It was created at the French canton reorganisation which came into effect in March 2015. Its seat is in Maubeuge.

It consists of the following communes:

1. Assevent
2. Bersillies
3. Bettignies
4. Boussois
5. Élesmes
6. Ferrière-la-Grande
7. Gognies-Chaussée
8. Jeumont
9. Louvroil
10. Mairieux
11. Marpent
12. Maubeuge
13. Vieux-Reng
14. Villers-Sire-Nicole
