= Gœgnies-Chaussée =

Coordinates: 50°20′N 3°56′E

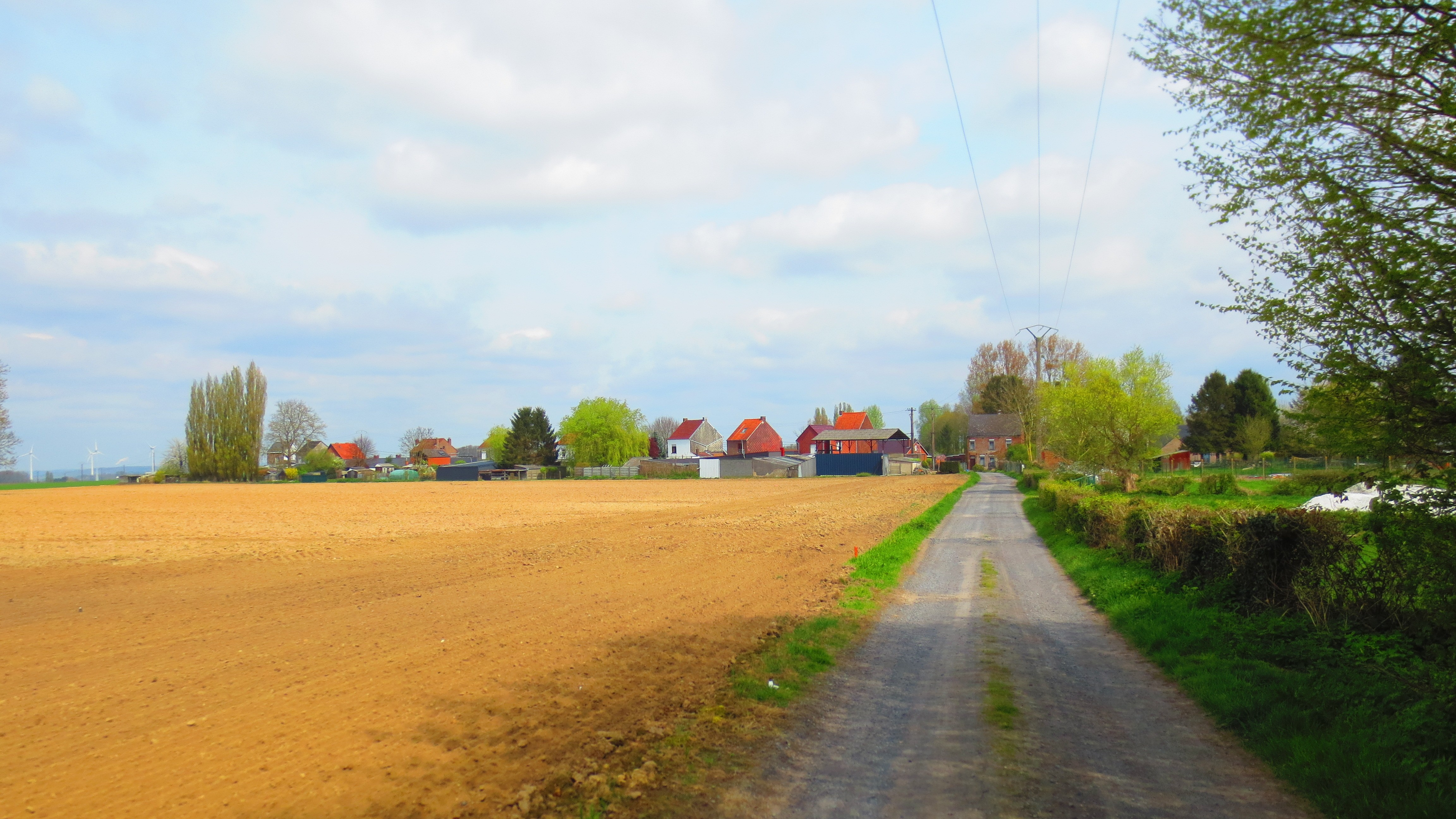
Gœgnies-Chaussée

Gœgnies-Chaussée (also spelled Goegnies-Chaussée) is a village of Wallonia and a district of the municipality of Quévy, located in the province of Hainaut, Belgium.

The border between Belgium and France runs right through the village, separating the Belgian Gœgnies-Chaussée from the French Gognies-Chaussée.
