= Saint-Remy-Chaussée =

- Commune
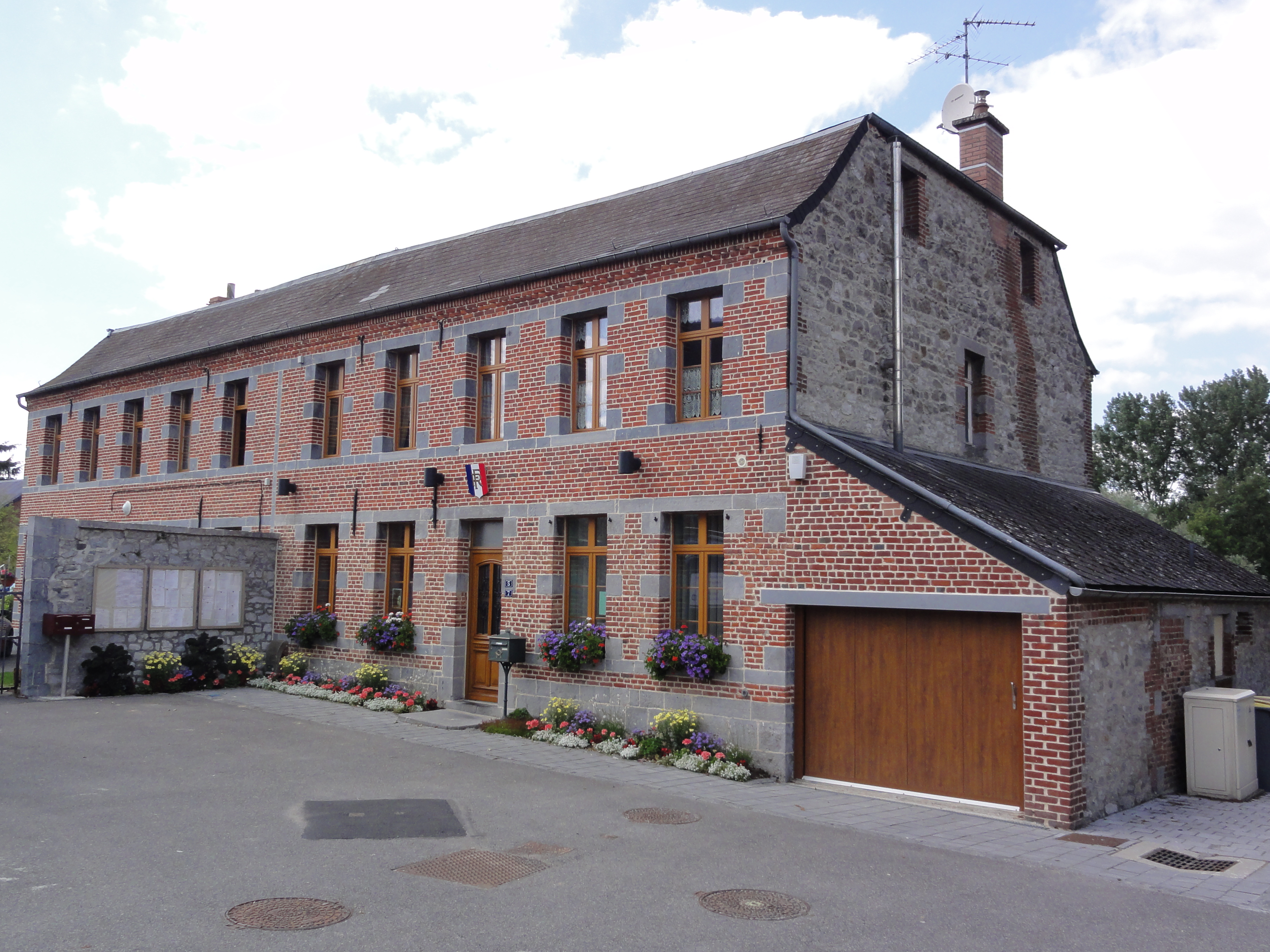
- The town hall in Saint-Remy-Chaussée

- Coat of arms
- Location of Saint-Remy-Chaussée
- Location within France Location within Hauts-de-France
- Coordinates: 50°10′15″N 3°52′21″E
- Country: France
- Region: Hauts-de-France
- Department: Nord
- Arrondissement: Avesnes-sur-Helpe
- Canton: Aulnoye-Aymeries
- Intercommunality: CA Maubeuge Val de Sambre

Government
  - Mayor (2020–2026): Didier Willot
- Area^{1}: 5.17 km^{2} (2.00 sq mi)
- Elevation: 152 m (499 ft)
- Highest elevation: 182 m (597 ft)
- Lowest elevation: 136 m (446 ft)
- Population (2023): 469
  - Density: 90.7/km^{2} (235/sq mi)
- Time zone: UTC+01:00 (CET)
  - Summer (DST): UTC+02:00 (CEST)
- INSEE/Postal code: 59542 /59620
- ^{1} French Land Register data, which excludes lakes, ponds, glaciers > 1 km^{2} (0.386 sq mi or 247 acres) and river estuaries.

Saint-Remy-Chaussée (French pronunciation: [sɛ̃ ʁemi ʃose]) is a commune in the Nord department in northern France.

== Heraldry ==
Arms of Saint-Remy-Chaussée	The arms of Saint-Remy-Chaussée are blazoned : Argent, a chevron between 3 trefoils sable. (Assevent, Romeries and Saint-Rémy-Chaussée use the same arms.)

== See also ==
- Communes of the Nord department
