= Romeries =

- Commune
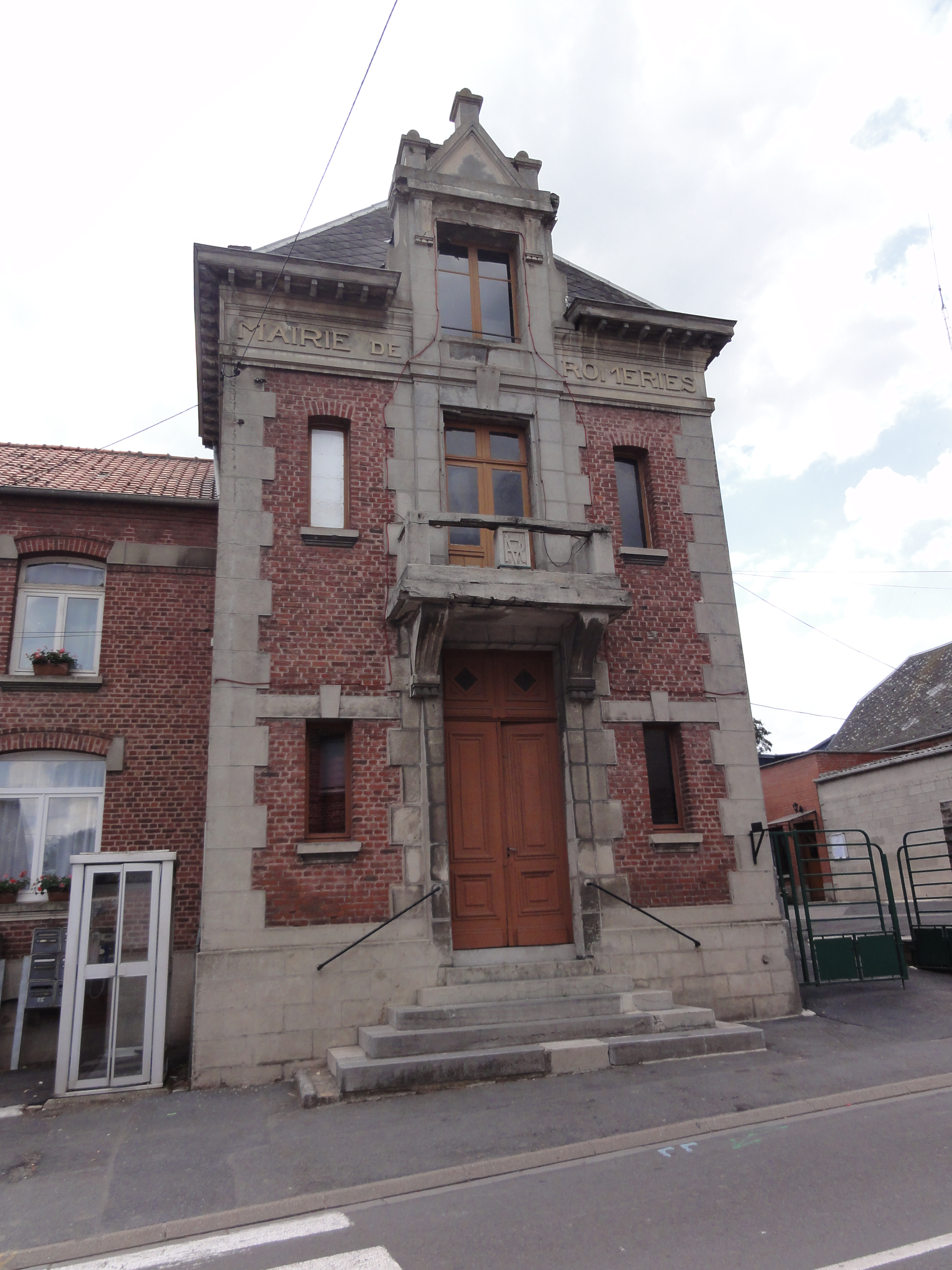
- The town hall in Romeries

- Coat of arms
- Location of Romeries
- Location within France Location within Hauts-de-France
- Coordinates: 50°12′12″N 3°31′55″E
- Country: France
- Region: Hauts-de-France
- Department: Nord
- Arrondissement: Cambrai
- Canton: Caudry
- Intercommunality: CC Pays Solesmois

Government
  - Mayor (2023–2026): Xavier Dupont
- Area^{1}: 6.01 km^{2} (2.32 sq mi)
- Elevation: 103 m (338 ft)
- Highest elevation: 126 m (413 ft)
- Lowest elevation: 91 m (299 ft)
- Population (2023): 471
  - Density: 78.4/km^{2} (203/sq mi)
- Time zone: UTC+01:00 (CET)
  - Summer (DST): UTC+02:00 (CEST)
- INSEE/Postal code: 59506 /59730
- ^{1} French Land Register data, which excludes lakes, ponds, glaciers > 1 km^{2} (0.386 sq mi or 247 acres) and river estuaries.

Romeries (French pronunciation: [ʁɔmʁi]) is a commune in the Nord department in northern France.

== Heraldry ==
Arms of Romeries	The arms of Romeries are blazoned : Argent, a chevron between 3 trefoils sable. (Assevent, Romeries and Saint-Rémy-Chaussée use the same arms.)

== See also ==
- Communes of the Nord department
