= Quiévelon =

- Commune
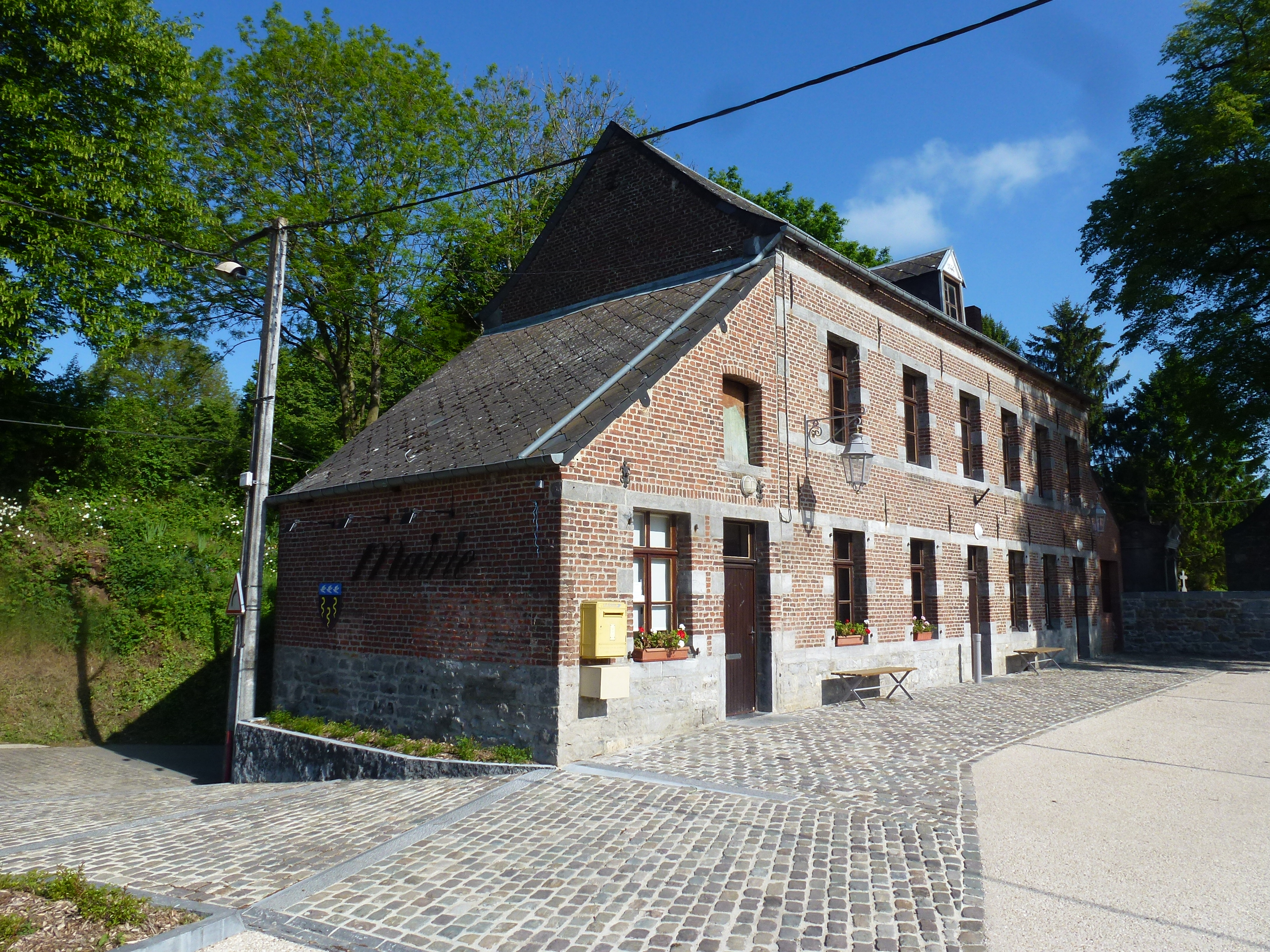
- The town hall in Quiévelon

- Coat of arms
- Location of Quiévelon
- Location within France Location within Hauts-de-France
- Coordinates: 50°14′15″N 4°04′28″E
- Country: France
- Region: Hauts-de-France
- Department: Nord
- Arrondissement: Avesnes-sur-Helpe
- Canton: Fourmies
- Intercommunality: CA Maubeuge Val de Sambre

Government
  - Mayor (2020–2026): Michel Hazard
- Area^{1}: 4.35 km^{2} (1.68 sq mi)
- Elevation: 200 m (660 ft)
- Highest elevation: 217 m (712 ft)
- Lowest elevation: 155 m (509 ft)
- Population (2023): 135
  - Density: 31.0/km^{2} (80.4/sq mi)
- Time zone: UTC+01:00 (CET)
  - Summer (DST): UTC+02:00 (CEST)
- INSEE/Postal code: 59483 /59680
- ^{1} French Land Register data, which excludes lakes, ponds, glaciers > 1 km^{2} (0.386 sq mi or 247 acres) and river estuaries.

Quiévelon (French pronunciation: [kjevlɔ̃]) is a commune in the Nord department in northern France.

== Heraldry ==
Arms of Quiévelon	The arms of Quiévelon are blazoned : Sable, 3 serpents palewise wavy Or, langued gules, on a chief azure 3 doves argent.

== See also ==
- Communes of the Nord department
