= Noyelles-sur-Escaut =

- Commune
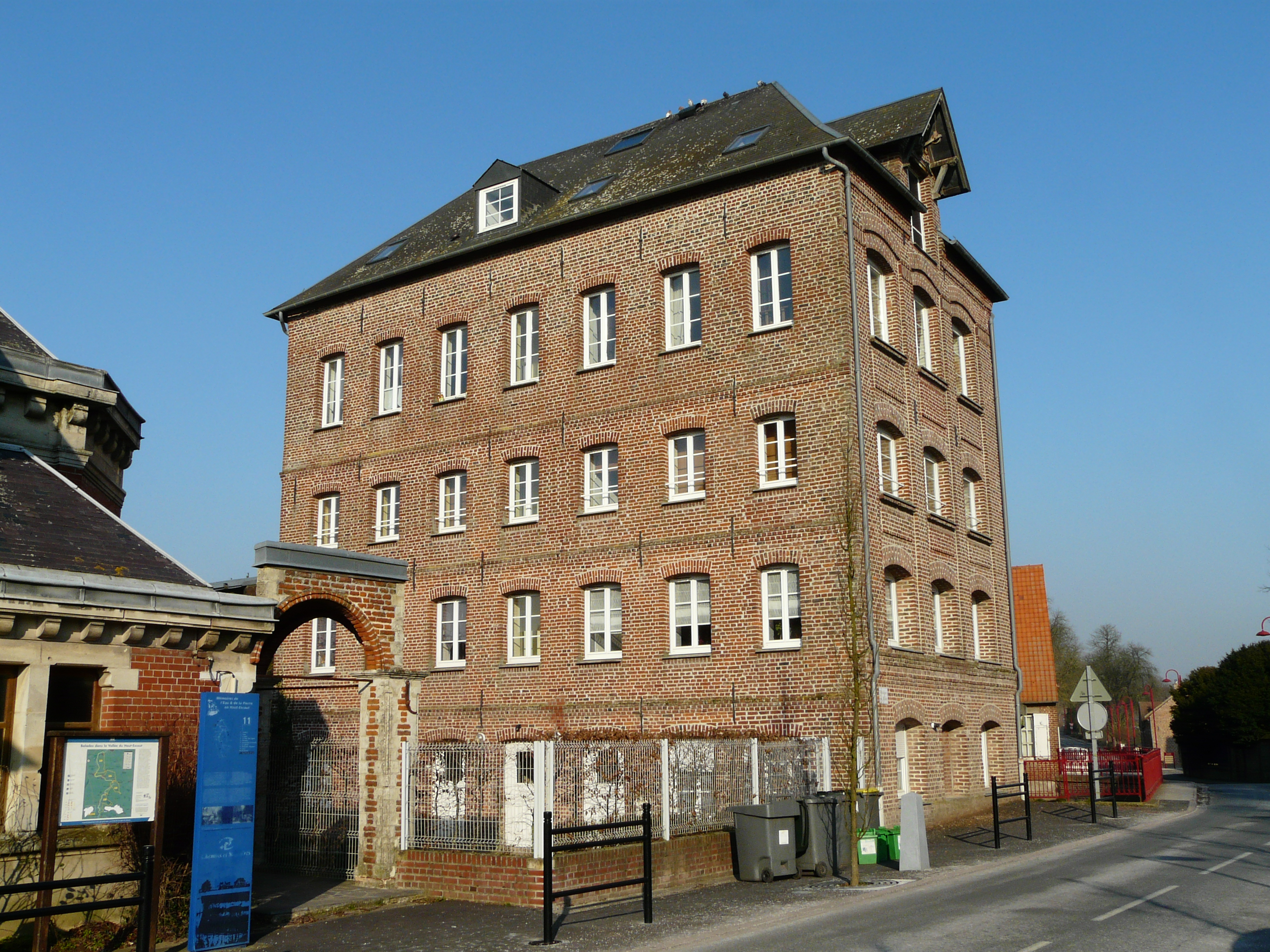
- The mill in Noyelles-sur-Escaut

- Coat of arms
- Location of Noyelles-sur-Escaut
- Location within France Location within Hauts-de-France
- Coordinates: 50°08′20″N 3°10′59″E
- Country: France
- Region: Hauts-de-France
- Department: Nord
- Arrondissement: Cambrai
- Canton: Le Cateau-Cambrésis
- Intercommunality: CA Cambrai

Government
  - Mayor (2024–2026): Valérie Vaillant
- Area^{1}: 4.8 km^{2} (1.9 sq mi)
- Elevation: 60 m (200 ft)
- Highest elevation: 92 m (302 ft)
- Lowest elevation: 47 m (154 ft)
- Population (2023): 816
  - Density: 170/km^{2} (440/sq mi)
- Time zone: UTC+01:00 (CET)
  - Summer (DST): UTC+02:00 (CEST)
- INSEE/Postal code: 59438 /59159
- ^{1} French Land Register data, which excludes lakes, ponds, glaciers > 1 km^{2} (0.386 sq mi or 247 acres) and river estuaries.

Noyelles-sur-Escaut (French pronunciation: [nwajɛl syʁ ɛsko], literally Noyelles on Escaut) is a commune in the Nord department in northern France.

== Heraldry ==
Arms of Noyelles-sur-Escaut	The arms of Noyelles-sur-Escaut are blazoned : Barry argent and azure. (Boussois, Noyelles-sur-Escaut and Villers-Campeau use the same arms.)

== See also ==
- Communes of the Nord department
