= Gognies-Chaussée =

Commune in Hauts-de-France, France

- Commune
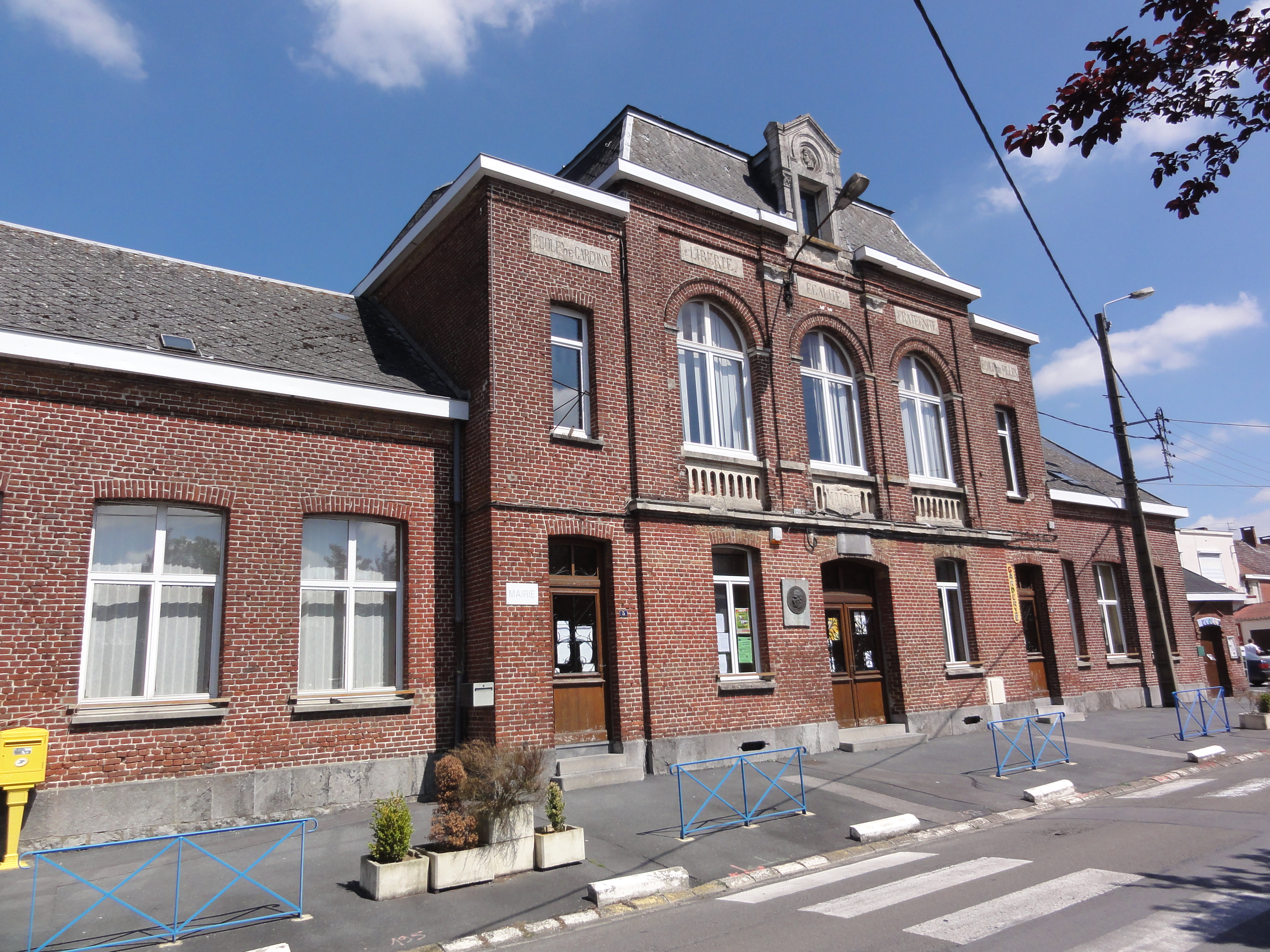
- The town hall in Gognies-Chaussée

- Coat of arms
- Location of Gognies-Chaussée
- Location within France Location within Hauts-de-France
- Coordinates: 50°20′25″N 3°56′43″E
- Country: France
- Region: Hauts-de-France
- Department: Nord
- Arrondissement: Avesnes-sur-Helpe
- Canton: Maubeuge
- Intercommunality: CA Maubeuge Val de Sambre

Government
  - Mayor (2020–2026): Bruno Masolini
- Area^{1}: 7.94 km^{2} (3.07 sq mi)
- Elevation: 145 m (476 ft)
- Highest elevation: 158 m (518 ft)
- Lowest elevation: 122 m (400 ft)
- Population (2023): 723
  - Density: 91.1/km^{2} (236/sq mi)
- Time zone: UTC+01:00 (CET)
  - Summer (DST): UTC+02:00 (CEST)
- INSEE/Postal code: 59264 /59600
- ^{1} French Land Register data, which excludes lakes, ponds, glaciers > 1 km^{2} (0.386 sq mi or 247 acres) and river estuaries.

Gognies-Chaussée (French pronunciation: [ɡɔɲi ʃose]) is a commune in the Nord department in northern France. It lies on the border with Belgium, adjacent to the Belgian village Gœgnies-Chaussée.

== Heraldry ==
Arms of Gognies-Chaussée	The arms of Gognies-Chaussée are blazoned : Azure, a cross moline argent.

== See also ==
- Communes of the Nord department
