= Assevent =

- Commune
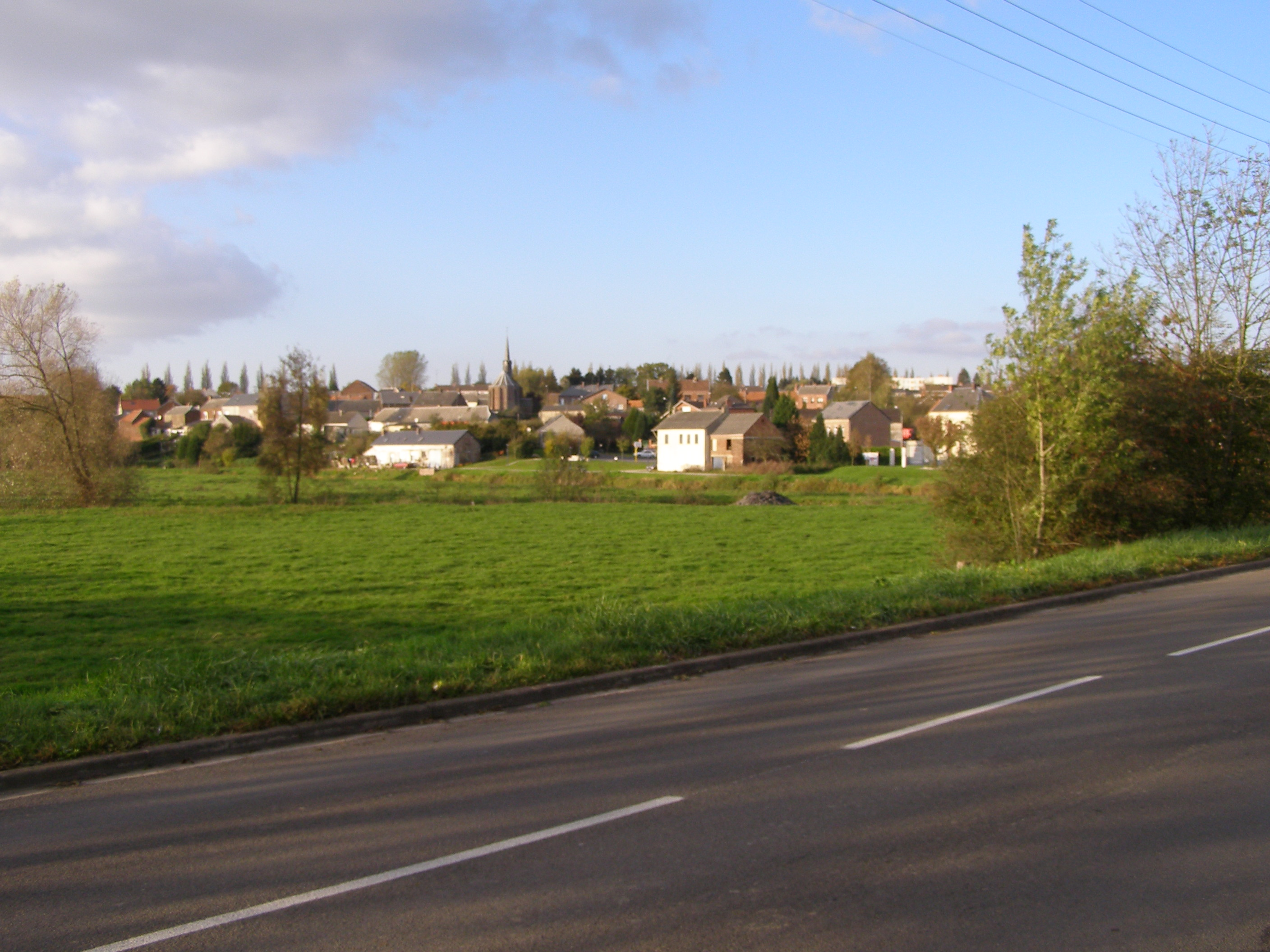
- A general view of Assevent

- Coat of arms
- Location of Assevent
- Location within France Location within Hauts-de-France
- Coordinates: 50°17′19″N 4°00′57″E
- Country: France
- Region: Hauts-de-France
- Department: Nord
- Arrondissement: Avesnes-sur-Helpe
- Canton: Maubeuge
- Intercommunality: CA Maubeuge Val de Sambre

Government
  - Mayor (2020–2026): Marjorie Mahieux
- Area^{1}: 1.87 km^{2} (0.72 sq mi)
- Elevation: 135 m (443 ft)
- Highest elevation: 151 m (495 ft)
- Lowest elevation: 122 m (400 ft)
- Population (2023): 1,769
  - Density: 946/km^{2} (2,450/sq mi)
- Time zone: UTC+01:00 (CET)
  - Summer (DST): UTC+02:00 (CEST)
- INSEE/Postal code: 59021 /59600
- ^{1} French Land Register data, which excludes lakes, ponds, glaciers > 1 km^{2} (0.386 sq mi or 247 acres) and river estuaries.

Assevent (French pronunciation: [asvɑ̃]) is a commune in the Nord department in northern France.

== Population ==
Historical population
Year	Pop.	±% p.a.
1968	924	—
1975	1,360	+5.68%
1982	1,599	+2.34%
1990	1,940	+2.45%
1999	1,875	−0.38%
2007	1,739	−0.94%
2012	1,839	+1.12%
2017	1,825	−0.15%
2023	1,769	−0.52%
Source: INSEE

== Heraldry ==
Arms of Assevent	The arms of Assevent are blazoned : Argent, a chevron between 3 trefoils sable. (Assevent, Romeries and Saint-Rémy-Chaussée use the same arms.)

== See also ==
- Communes of the Nord department
