= Bettignies =

- Commune
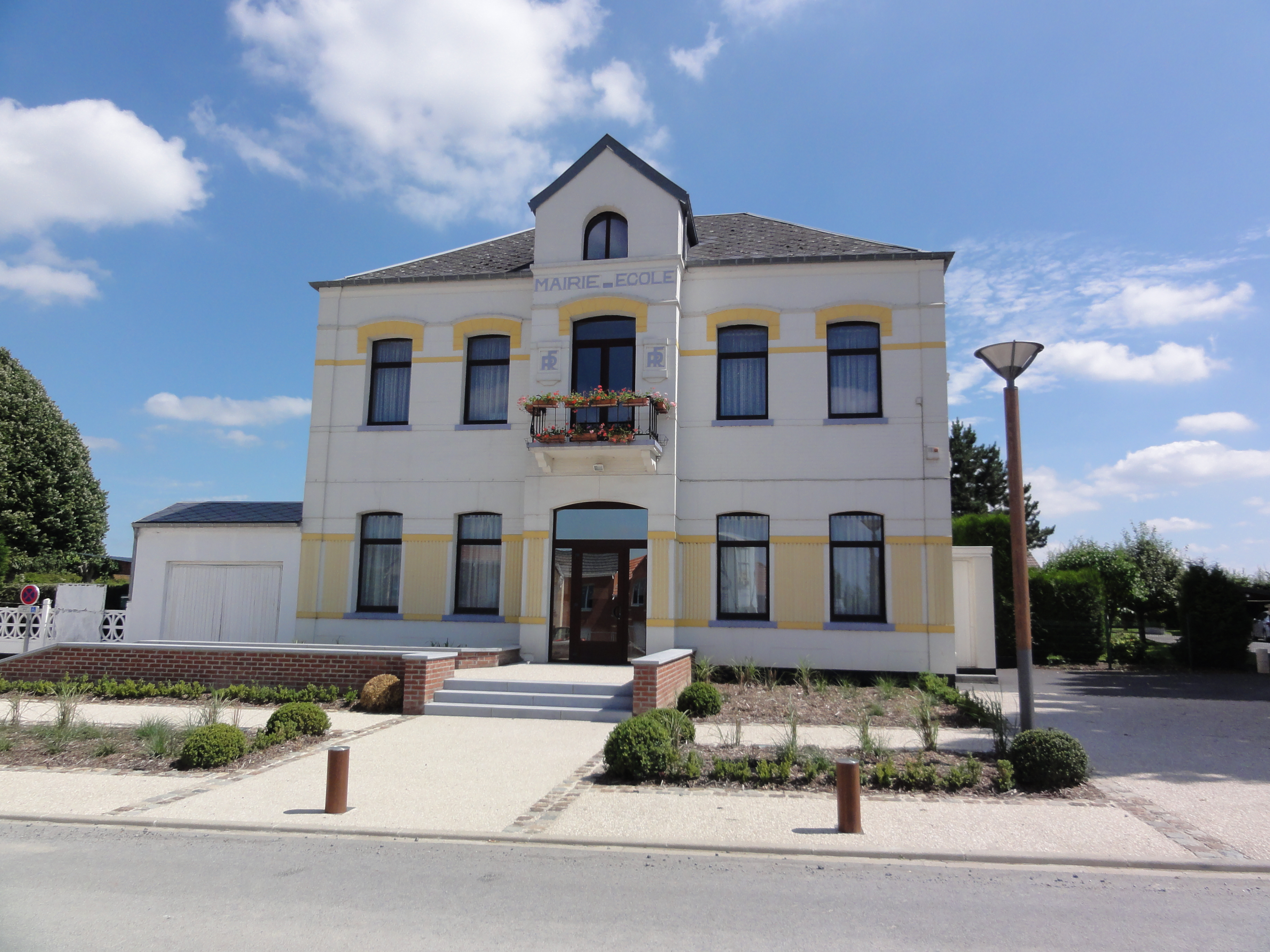
- The town hall in Bettignies

- Coat of arms
- Location of Bettignies
- Location within France Location within Hauts-de-France
- Coordinates: 50°20′07″N 3°58′20″E
- Country: France
- Region: Hauts-de-France
- Department: Nord
- Arrondissement: Avesnes-sur-Helpe
- Canton: Maubeuge
- Intercommunality: CA Maubeuge Val de Sambre

Government
  - Mayor (2020–2026): Michel Lefebvre
- Area^{1}: 4.62 km^{2} (1.78 sq mi)
- Elevation: 143 m (469 ft)
- Highest elevation: 158 m (518 ft)
- Lowest elevation: 122 m (400 ft)
- Population (2023): 343
  - Density: 74.2/km^{2} (192/sq mi)
- Time zone: UTC+01:00 (CET)
  - Summer (DST): UTC+02:00 (CEST)
- INSEE/Postal code: 59076 /59600
- ^{1} French Land Register data, which excludes lakes, ponds, glaciers > 1 km^{2} (0.386 sq mi or 247 acres) and river estuaries.

Bettignies (French pronunciation: [betiɲi]) is a commune in the Nord department in northern France.

== Population ==
Historical population
Year	Pop.	±% p.a.
1968	243	—
1975	211	−2.00%
1982	222	+0.73%
1990	238	+0.87%
1999	269	+1.37%
2007	265	−0.19%
2012	274	+0.67%
2017	310	+2.50%
2023	343	+1.70%
Source: INSEE

== Heraldry ==
Arms of Bettignies	The arms of Bettignies are blazoned : Or, a chief sable.

== See also ==
- Communes of the Nord department
