= Communauté d'agglomération Maubeuge Val de Sambre =

Maubeuge Val de Sambre
- Communauté d'agglomération
- Interactive map of Maubeuge Val de Sambre
- Country: France
- Region: Hauts-de-France
- Department: Nord
- No. of communes: {{{nbcomm}}}
- Established: 2013
- Area: 343.6 km^{2} (132.7 sq mi)
- Population (2017): 125,651
  - Density: 365.7/km^{2} (947.1/sq mi)
- Website: agglo-maubeugevaldesambre.fr

The Communauté d'agglomération Maubeuge Val de Sambre is an intercommunal structure, centred on the city of Maubeuge. It is located in the Nord department, in the Hauts-de-France region, northern France. It was created in December 2013. Its seat is in Maubeuge. Its area is 343.6 km^{2}. Its population was 125,651 in 2017, of which 29,944 in Maubeuge proper.

== Composition ==
The communauté d'agglomération consists of the following 43 communes:

1. Aibes
2. Assevent
3. Aulnoye-Aymeries
4. Bachant
5. Beaufort
6. Berlaimont
7. Bersillies
8. Bettignies
9. Bousignies-sur-Roc
10. Boussières-sur-Sambre
11. Boussois
12. Cerfontaine
13. Colleret
14. Cousolre
15. Éclaibes
16. Écuélin
17. Élesmes
18. Feignies
19. Ferrière-la-Grande
20. Ferrière-la-Petite
21. Gognies-Chaussée
22. Hautmont
23. Jeumont
24. Leval
25. Limont-Fontaine
26. Louvroil
27. Mairieux
28. Marpent
29. Maubeuge
30. Monceau-Saint-Waast
31. Neuf-Mesnil
32. Noyelles-sur-Sambre
33. Obrechies
34. Pont-sur-Sambre
35. Quiévelon
36. Recquignies
37. Rousies
38. Saint-Remy-Chaussée
39. Saint-Remy-du-Nord
40. Sassegnies
41. Vieux-Mesnil
42. Vieux-Reng
43. Villers-Sire-Nicole
