= Aibes =

- Commune
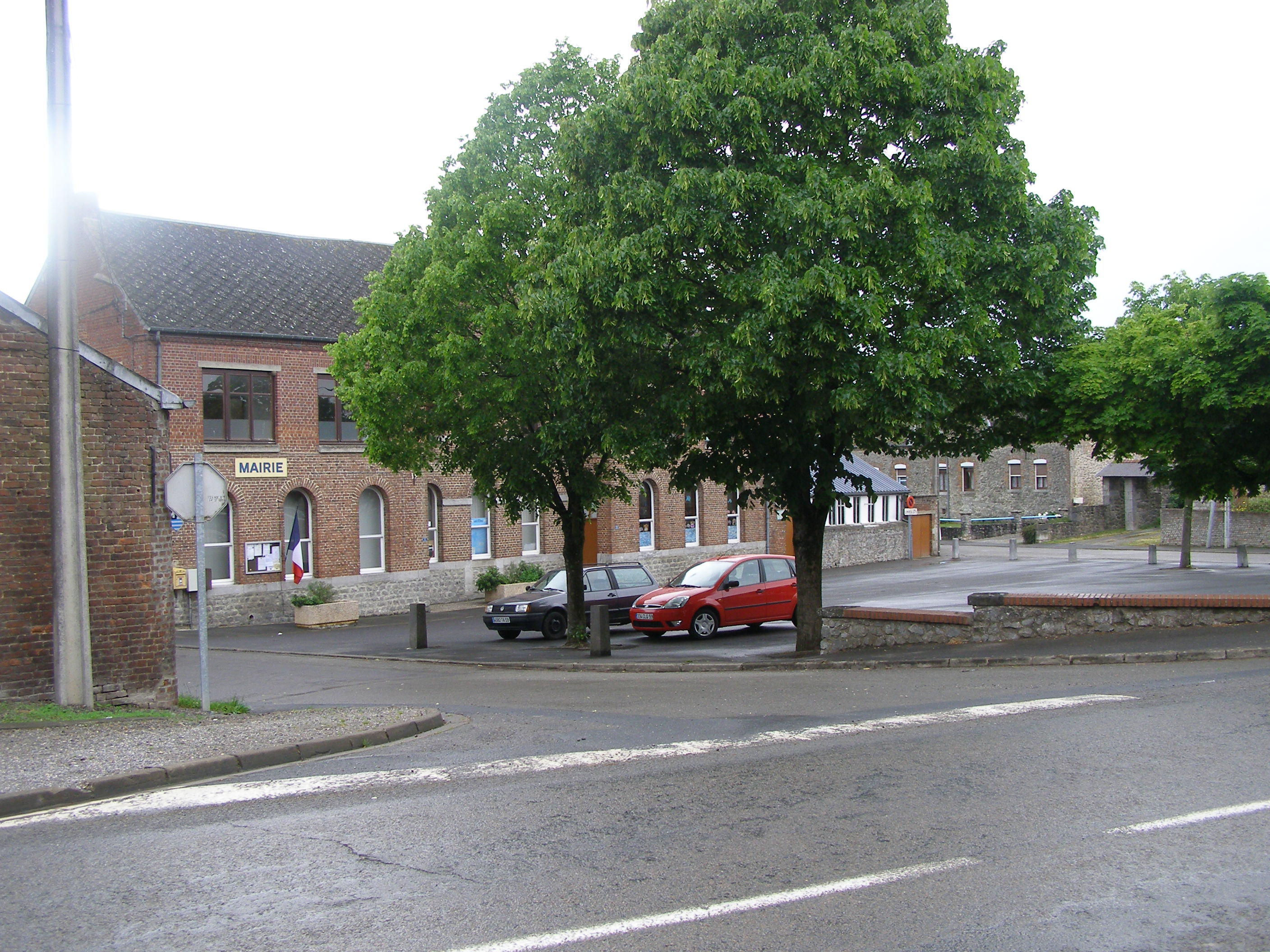
- The town hall in Aibes

- Coat of arms
- Location of Aibes
- Location within France Location within Hauts-de-France
- Coordinates: 50°14′14″N 4°05′38″E
- Country: France
- Region: Hauts-de-France
- Department: Nord
- Arrondissement: Avesnes-sur-Helpe
- Canton: Fourmies
- Intercommunality: CA Maubeuge Val de Sambre

Government
  - Mayor (2020–2026): Pascal Chabot
- Area^{1}: 9.23 km^{2} (3.56 sq mi)
- Elevation: 37 m (121 ft)
- Highest elevation: 228 m (748 ft)
- Lowest elevation: 163 m (535 ft)
- Population (2023): 350
  - Density: 38/km^{2} (98/sq mi)
- Time zone: UTC+01:00 (CET)
  - Summer (DST): UTC+02:00 (CEST)
- INSEE/Postal code: 59003 /59149
- ^{1} French Land Register data, which excludes lakes, ponds, glaciers > 1 km^{2} (0.386 sq mi or 247 acres) and river estuaries.

Aibes (French pronunciation: [ɛb] eb) is a commune in the Nord department in northern France.

== Population ==
Historical population
Year	Pop.	±% p.a.
1968	314	—
1975	323	+0.40%
1982	339	+0.69%
1990	400	+2.09%
1999	385	−0.42%
2007	357	−0.94%
2012	376	+1.04%
2017	370	−0.32%
2023	350	−0.92%
Source: INSEE

== Heraldry ==
Arms of Aibes	The arms of Aibes are blazoned : Barry argent and azure, on a canton sable a goat's head argent horned Or.

== See also ==
- Communes of the Nord department
