= Recquignies =

- Commune
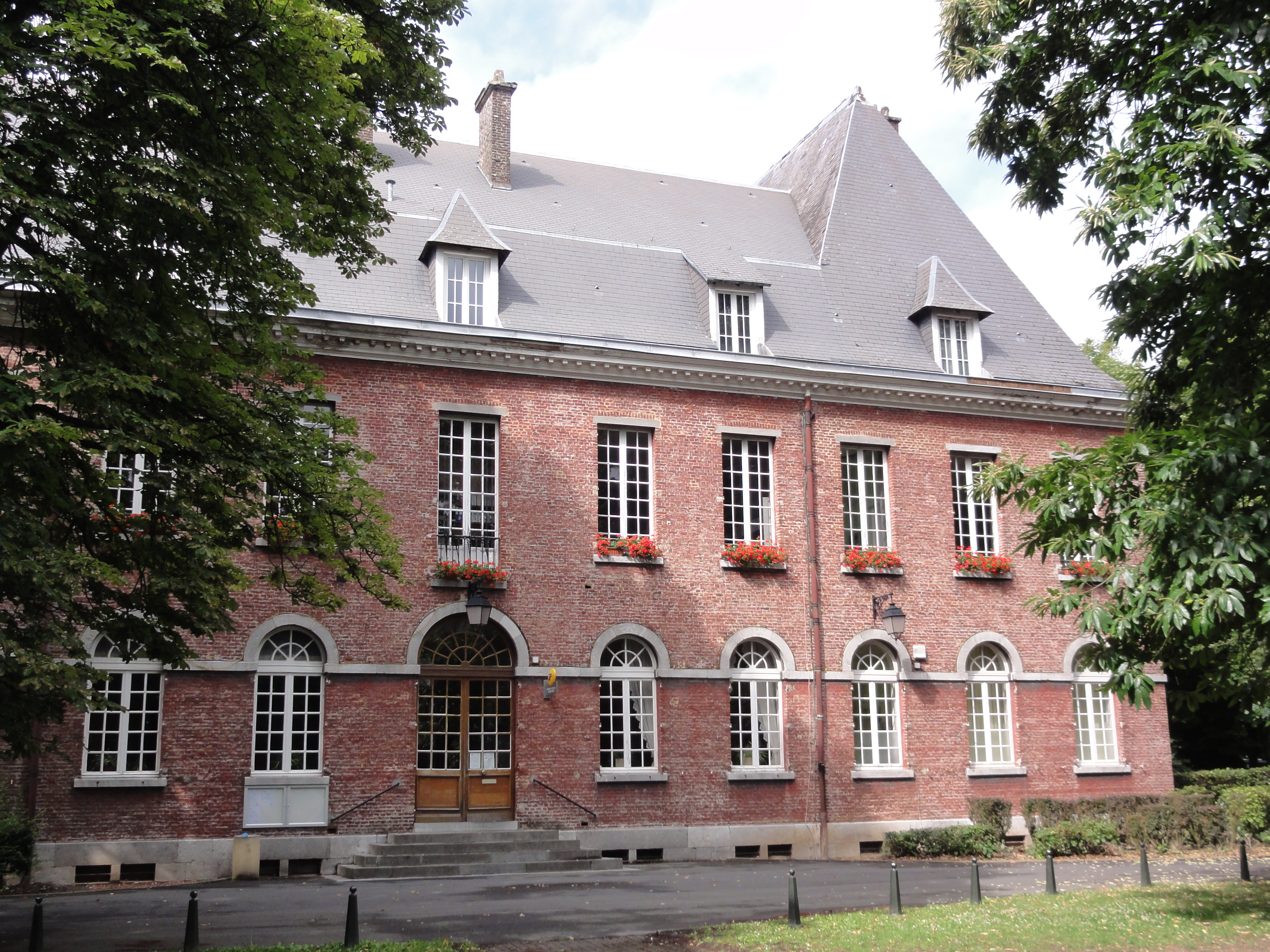
- The town hall in Recquignies

- Coat of arms
- Location of Recquignies
- Location within France Location within Hauts-de-France
- Coordinates: 50°16′52″N 4°02′28″E
- Country: France
- Region: Hauts-de-France
- Department: Nord
- Arrondissement: Avesnes-sur-Helpe
- Canton: Fourmies
- Intercommunality: CA Maubeuge Val de Sambre

Government
  - Mayor (2020–2026): Ghislain Rosier
- Area^{1}: 6.17 km^{2} (2.38 sq mi)
- Elevation: 150 m (490 ft)
- Highest elevation: 189 m (620 ft)
- Lowest elevation: 122 m (400 ft)
- Population (2023): 2,338
  - Density: 379/km^{2} (981/sq mi)
- Time zone: UTC+01:00 (CET)
  - Summer (DST): UTC+02:00 (CEST)
- INSEE/Postal code: 59495 /59245
- ^{1} French Land Register data, which excludes lakes, ponds, glaciers > 1 km^{2} (0.386 sq mi or 247 acres) and river estuaries.

Recquignies (French pronunciation: [ʁɛkiɲi]) is a commune in the Nord department in northern France.

== Population ==
Historical population
Year	Pop.	±% p.a.
1968	2,428	—
1975	2,382	−0.27%
1982	2,577	+1.13%
1990	2,521	−0.27%
1999	2,490	−0.14%
2007	2,355	−0.69%
2012	2,380	+0.21%
2017	2,413	+0.28%
2023	2,338	−0.52%
Source: INSEE

== Heraldry ==
Arms of Recquignies	The arms of Recquignies are blazoned : Barry argent and azure, a bend gules.

== See also ==
- Communes of the Nord department
