= Élesmes =

- Commune
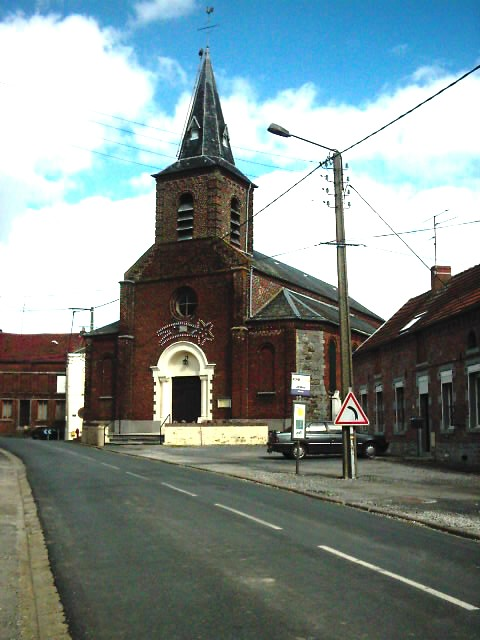
- St. Martin's Church

- Coat of arms
- Location of Élesmes
- Location within France Location within Hauts-de-France
- Coordinates: 50°18′25″N 4°00′36″E
- Country: France
- Region: Hauts-de-France
- Department: Nord
- Arrondissement: Avesnes-sur-Helpe
- Canton: Maubeuge
- Intercommunality: CA Maubeuge Val de Sambre

Government
  - Mayor (2020–2026): Eric Feddi
- Area^{1}: 6.23 km^{2} (2.41 sq mi)
- Elevation: 129 m (423 ft)
- Highest elevation: 151 m (495 ft)
- Lowest elevation: 124 m (407 ft)
- Population (2023): 1,013
  - Density: 163/km^{2} (421/sq mi)
- Time zone: UTC+01:00 (CET)
  - Summer (DST): UTC+02:00 (CEST)
- INSEE/Postal code: 59190 /59600
- ^{1} French Land Register data, which excludes lakes, ponds, glaciers > 1 km^{2} (0.386 sq mi or 247 acres) and river estuaries.

Élesmes is a commune in the Nord department in northern France.

== Heraldry ==
Arms of Élesmes	The arms of Élesmes are blazoned : Argent, a bend azure.

== See also ==
- Communes of the Nord department
