= Ferrière-la-Petite =

- Commune
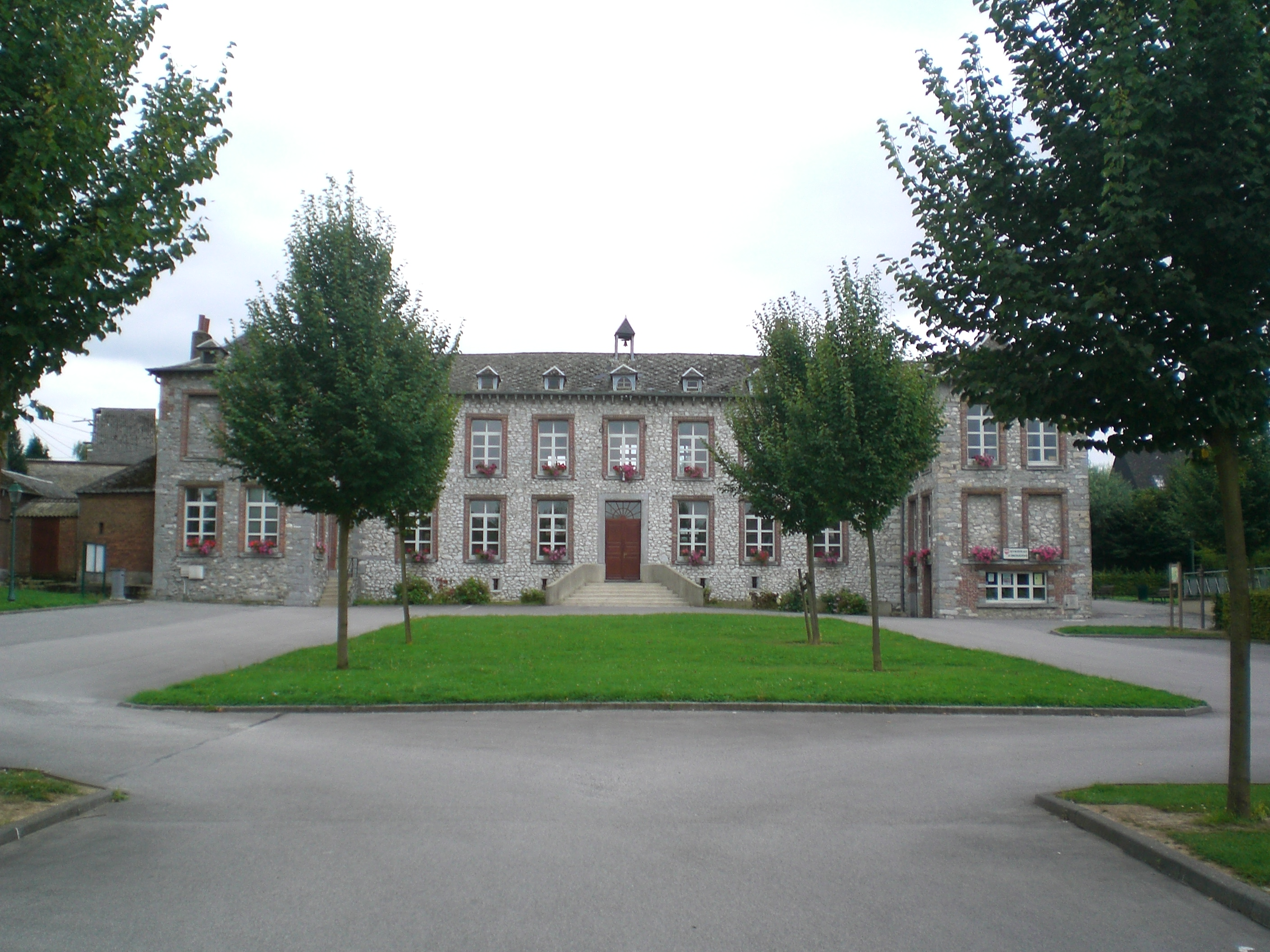
- The town hall in Ferrière-la-Petite

- Coat of arms
- Location of Ferrière-la-Petite
- Location within France Location within Hauts-de-France
- Coordinates: 50°14′26″N 4°01′23″E
- Country: France
- Region: Hauts-de-France
- Department: Nord
- Arrondissement: Avesnes-sur-Helpe
- Canton: Fourmies
- Intercommunality: CA Maubeuge Val de Sambre

Government
  - Mayor (2023–2026): Pierre Tondeur
- Area^{1}: 5.35 km^{2} (2.07 sq mi)
- Elevation: 137 m (449 ft)
- Highest elevation: 188 m (617 ft)
- Lowest elevation: 131 m (430 ft)
- Population (2023): 1,024
  - Density: 191/km^{2} (496/sq mi)
- Time zone: UTC+01:00 (CET)
  - Summer (DST): UTC+02:00 (CEST)
- INSEE/Postal code: 59231 /59680
- ^{1} French Land Register data, which excludes lakes, ponds, glaciers > 1 km^{2} (0.386 sq mi or 247 acres) and river estuaries.

Ferrière-la-Petite (French pronunciation: [fɛʁjɛʁ la pətit]) is a commune in the Nord department in northern France. The river Solre flows through the commune.

== Heraldry ==
Arms of Ferrière-la-Petite	The arms of Ferrière-la-Petite are blazoned : Gules, on a fess argent, 3 breams proper.

== See also ==
- Communes of the Nord department
