= Boussois =

- Commune
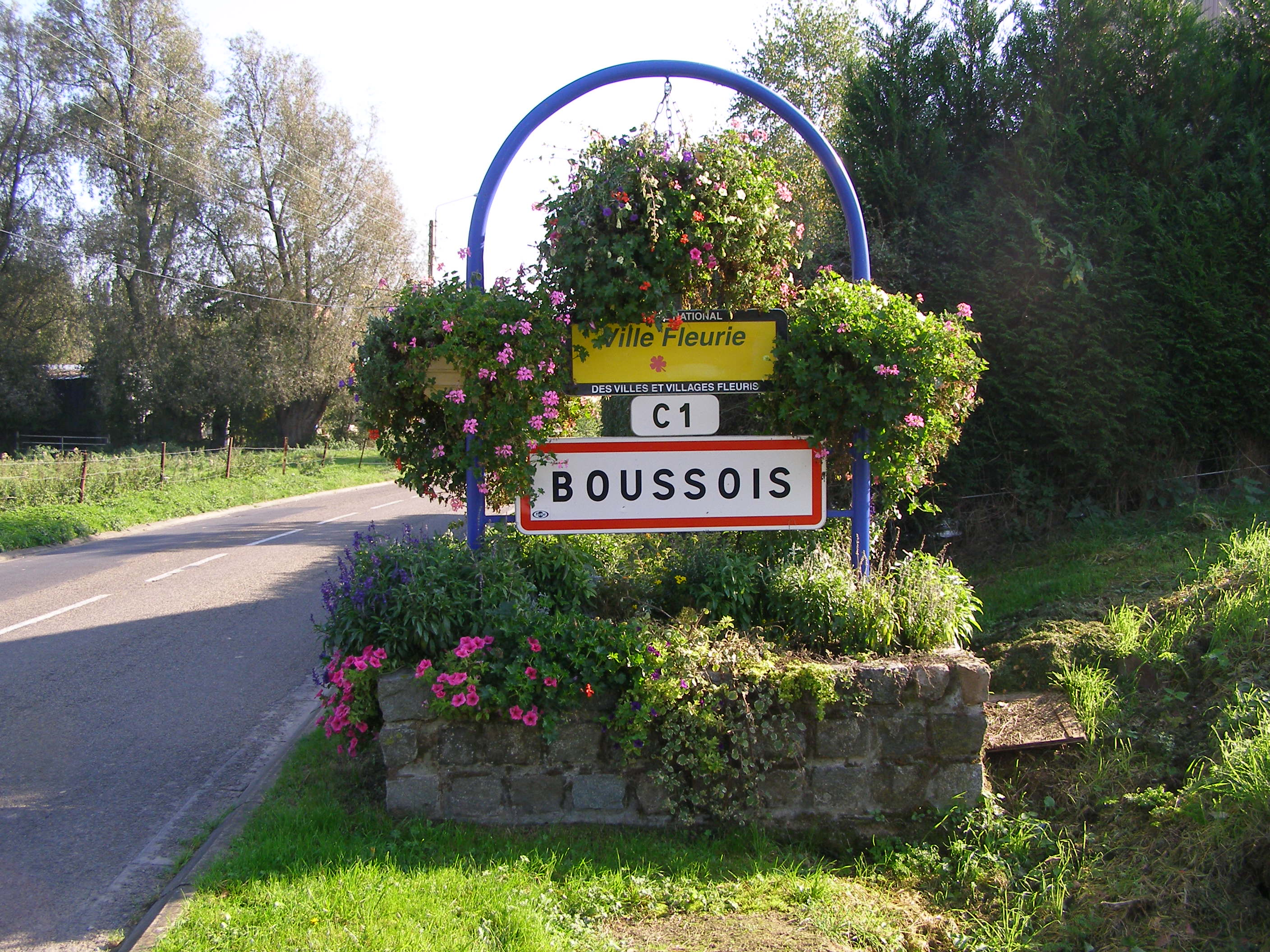
- The road into Boussois

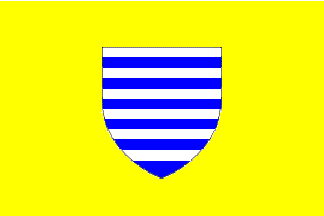
- Flag Coat of arms
- Location of Boussois
- Location within France Location within Hauts-de-France
- Coordinates: 50°17′28″N 4°02′30″E
- Country: France
- Region: Hauts-de-France
- Department: Nord
- Arrondissement: Avesnes-sur-Helpe
- Canton: Maubeuge
- Intercommunality: CA Maubeuge Val de Sambre

Government
  - Mayor (2020–2026): Jean-Claude Maret
- Area^{1}: 6.29 km^{2} (2.43 sq mi)
- Elevation: 152 m (499 ft)
- Highest elevation: 166 m (545 ft)
- Lowest elevation: 122 m (400 ft)
- Population (2023): 3,123
  - Density: 497/km^{2} (1,290/sq mi)
- Time zone: UTC+01:00 (CET)
  - Summer (DST): UTC+02:00 (CEST)
- INSEE/Postal code: 59104 /59168
- ^{1} French Land Register data, which excludes lakes, ponds, glaciers > 1 km^{2} (0.386 sq mi or 247 acres) and river estuaries.

Boussois (French pronunciation: [buswa]) is a commune in the Nord department in northern France.

== Population ==
Historical population

Year	Pop.	±% p.a.
1793	372	—
1821	292	−0.86%
1846	407	+1.34%
1872	519	+0.94%
1901	1,310	+3.24%
1926	2,538	+2.68%
1946	2,242	−0.62%
1962	3,319	+2.48%
1968	3,575	+1.25%

Year	Pop.	±% p.a.
1975	3,531	−0.18%
1982	3,483	−0.20%
1990	3,461	−0.08%
1999	3,449	−0.04%
2007	3,318	−0.48%
2012	3,222	−0.59%
2017	3,231	+0.06%
2023	3,123	−0.57%

Source: EHESS and INSEE (1968-2023)

== Heraldry ==
Arms of Boussois	The arms of Boussois are blazoned : Barry argent and azure. (Boussois, Noyelles-sur-Escaut and Villers-Campeau use the same arms.)

== See also ==
- Communes of the Nord department
