= Louvroil =

- Commune
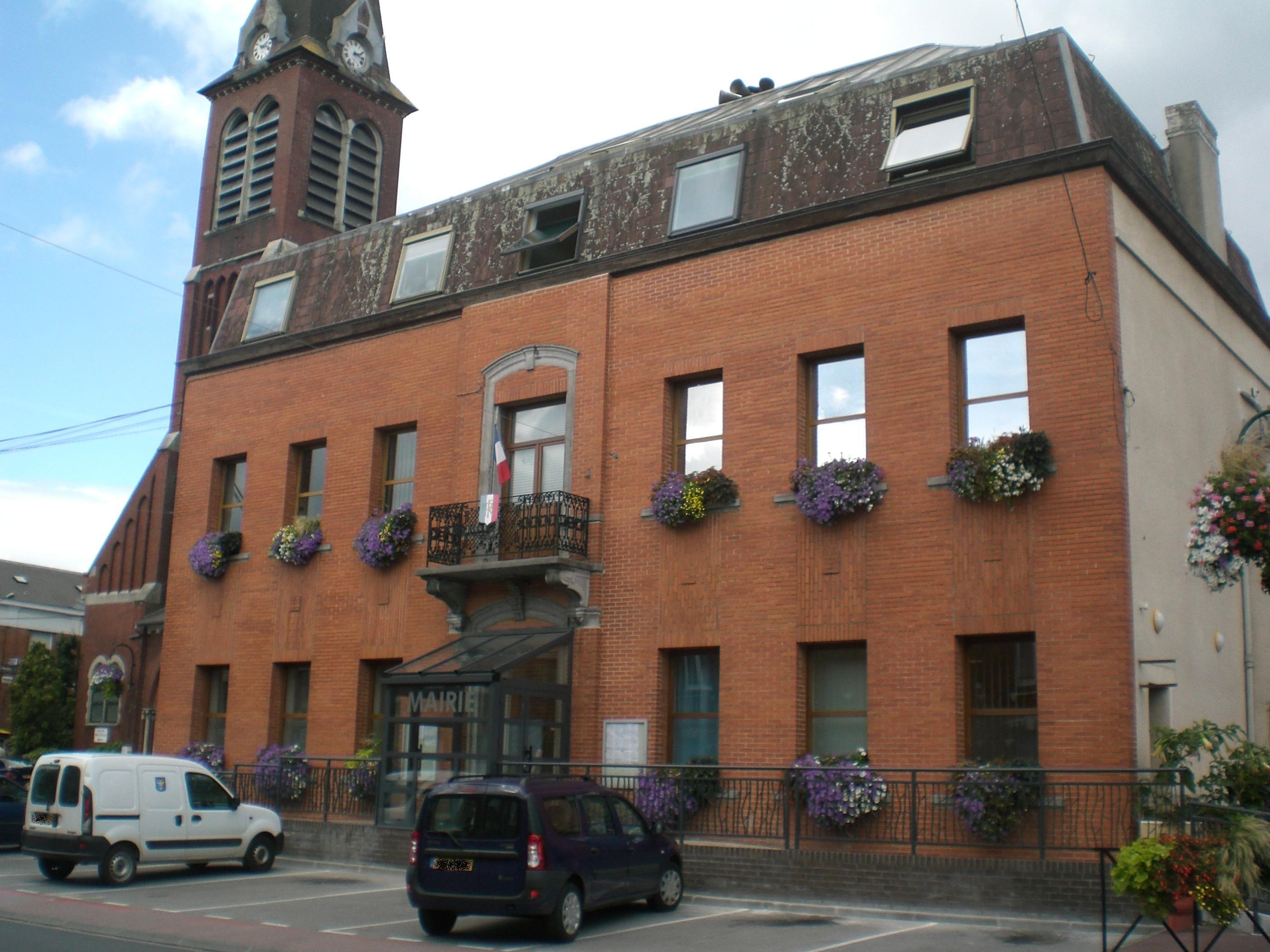
- The town hall

- Coat of arms
- Location of Louvroil
- Location within France Location within Hauts-de-France
- Coordinates: 50°15′54″N 3°57′36″E
- Country: France
- Region: Hauts-de-France
- Department: Nord
- Arrondissement: Avesnes-sur-Helpe
- Canton: Maubeuge
- Intercommunality: CA Maubeuge Val de Sambre

Government
  - Mayor (2020–2026): Giuseppe Ascone
- Area^{1}: 5.9 km^{2} (2.3 sq mi)
- Elevation: 133 m (436 ft)
- Highest elevation: 175 m (574 ft)
- Lowest elevation: 122 m (400 ft)
- Population (2023): 6,294
  - Density: 1,100/km^{2} (2,800/sq mi)
- Time zone: UTC+01:00 (CET)
  - Summer (DST): UTC+02:00 (CEST)
- INSEE/Postal code: 59365 /59720
- ^{1} French Land Register data, which excludes lakes, ponds, glaciers > 1 km^{2} (0.386 sq mi or 247 acres) and river estuaries.

Louvroil (French pronunciation: [luvʁwal]) is a commune in the Nord department in northern France. It lies adjacent to the southwest of Maubeuge.

== Population ==
Historical population
Year	Pop.	±% p.a.
1968	6,891	—
1975	8,005	+2.16%
1982	8,208	+0.36%
1990	7,349	−1.37%
1999	7,251	−0.15%
2007	6,904	−0.61%
2012	6,637	−0.79%
2017	6,481	−0.47%
2023	6,294	−0.49%
Source: INSEE

== Heraldry ==
Arms of Louvroil (traditional)	The traditional arms of Louvroil are blazoned : Or, a double headed eagle sable, beaked and membered Or, langued gules. (Louvroil and Mecquignies use the same arms.).
Arms of Louvroil (modern)	The arms of Louvroil that the town currently uses are blazoned : Azure, a double-headed eagle Or.

== See also ==
- Communes of the Nord department
