= Mairieux =

- Commune
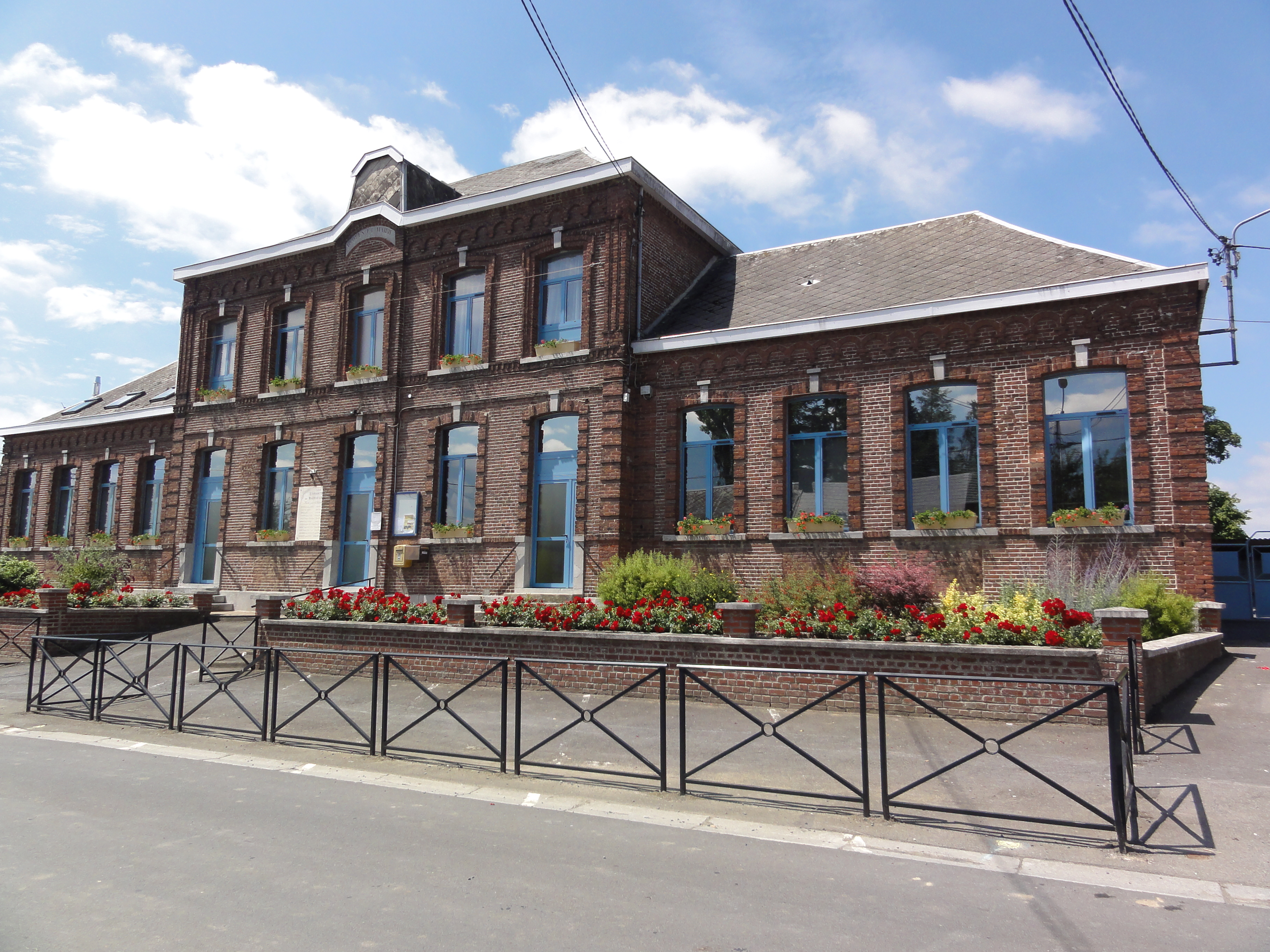
- The school and town hall

- Coat of arms
- Location of Mairieux
- Location within France Location within Hauts-de-France
- Coordinates: 50°18′51″N 3°59′36″E
- Country: France
- Region: Hauts-de-France
- Department: Nord
- Arrondissement: Avesnes-sur-Helpe
- Canton: Maubeuge
- Intercommunality: CA Maubeuge Val de Sambre

Government
  - Mayor (2020–2026): Alain Bouilliez
- Area^{1}: 6.49 km^{2} (2.51 sq mi)
- Elevation: 148 m (486 ft)
- Highest elevation: 169 m (554 ft)
- Lowest elevation: 129 m (423 ft)
- Population (2023): 699
  - Density: 108/km^{2} (279/sq mi)
- Time zone: UTC+01:00 (CET)
  - Summer (DST): UTC+02:00 (CEST)
- INSEE/Postal code: 59370 /59600
- ^{1} French Land Register data, which excludes lakes, ponds, glaciers > 1 km^{2} (0.386 sq mi or 247 acres) and river estuaries.

Mairieux (French pronunciation: [mɛʁjø]) is a commune in the Nord department in northern France.

== Heraldry ==
Arms of Mairieux	The arms of Mairieux are blazoned : Azure, a cross crosslet of calvary Or.

== See also ==
- Communes of the Nord department
