= Armorial of the Communes of Nord (A–C) =

This page lists the armoury emblazons, heraldic descriptions, or coats of arms of the communes in Nord (A-C)

== Complete lists of Nord armorial pages ==
- Armorial of the Communes of Nord (A–C)
- Armorial of the Communes of Nord (D–H)
- Armorial of the Communes of Nord (I–P)
- Armorial of the Communes of Nord (Q–Z)

== A ==
Image	Name of Commune	French blazon	English blazon
	Abancourt	D'azur à une étoile à cinq rais d'or, accompagnée en chef d'un lambel à trois pendants du même.	Azure, a mullet, and in chief a label of 3 points Or. (Abancourt and Fontaine-au-Pire use the same arms.)
	Abscon	D'or à une escarboucle de sable chargée en cœur d'un rubis de gueules.	Or, on an escarbuncle sable a ruby gules. (Abscon, Beuvry-la-Forêt, Erre, Fenain, Marchiennes, Ronchin, Tilloy-lez-Marchiennes and Wandignies-Hamage use the same arms.)
	Aibes	Burelé d'argent et d'azur de 12 pièces, au franc quartier de sable chargé d'une tête de bouc d'argent accornée d'or.	Barry argent and azure on a canton sable a goat head argent horned or.
	Aix-en-Pévèle	De gueules au lion d'or, armé lampassé et couronné d'azur.	Gules, a lion Or, armed, langued and crowned azure. (Aix-en-Pévèle, Emmerin, and Haubourdin use the same arms.)
	Allennes-les-Marais	D'or à dix losanges accolées et aboutées de gueules, 3, 3, 3, et 1.	Or ten lozenges conjoined gules 3, 3, 3, and 1.
	Amfroipret	D'azur au lion d'argent, au chef d'or.	Azure a lion argent, a chief or.
	Anhiers	Coupé d'or et d'azur, à trois fleurs de lis de l'un en l'autre.	Per fess Or and azure, 3 fleurs de lys counterchanged. (Anhiers and Merville use the same arms.)
	Aniche	D'hermine à la croix de gueules, chargée de cinq roses d'or.	Ermine, on a cross gules, 5 roses Or. (Aniche, Bugnicourt, and Rieulay use the same arms.)
	Annappes; Since 1970 part of Villeneuve-d'Ascq.	De sinople à la bande échiquetée d'argent et de gueules de deux tires.	Vert a bend chequy argent and gules of two traits.
	Anneux	D'or à trois croissants de gueules.	Or, 3 crescents gules. (Anneux, Crèvecœur-sur-l'Escaut, Rumilly-en-Cambrésis, Saint-Souplet and Wargnies-le-Petit use the same arms.)
	Annœullin	D'or à la croix ancrée de gueules	Or, a cross moline gules. (Annœullin, Bauvin and Mons-en-Pévèle use the same arms.)
	Anor	De sinople, semé de billettes d'or, au lion du même brochant sur le tout.	Vert billetty a lion or.
	Anstaing	D'or au franc quartier de gueules.	Or, a canton gules. (Anstaing and Sainghin-en-Mélantois use the same arms.)
	Anzin	D'or à la bande fascée vivrée d'argent et de sable de huit pièces, chaque fasce de sable chargée de quatre filets vivrés aussi d'argent, au chef soudé du même chargé de trois brasiers de gueules. (1874) est le blasonnement actuel. De sable à quatre clefs d'argent, le panneton en haut et à dextre, ordonnées 2 et 2. est plus vieux.	Or, a bend bendy indented argent and sable, on chief argent, 3 braziers gules. (arms since 1874)
	Arleux	D'argent à trois tours de gueules.	Argent three towers gules.
	Armbouts-Cappel	D'hermine au chevron de sable.	Ermine a chevron sable.
	Armentières	D'argent à la fleur de lys de gueules, au chef du même chargé à dextre d'un soleil d'or et à senestre d'une lune en décours du même.	Argent a fleur de lys gules and on a chief of the same in the dexter a sun or and in the sinister a decrescent of the same.
	Arnèke	De sable à la croix d'argent chargée de cinq mouchetures d'hermine de sable.	Sable on a cross argent five ermine spots sable.
	Artres	D'or à la croix engrêlée de gueules.	Or, a cross engrailed gules. (Artres, Bettrechies, Cerfontaine, Denain, Eth, Lesquin, Obies, Quérénaing, Semousies, Wambrechies and Warlaing use the same arms.)
	Ascq; Since 1970 part of Villeneuve-d'Ascq.	D'or à la fasce d'azur, au sautoir de gueules brochant sur le tout.	Or a fess azure overall a saltire gules.
	Assevent	D'argent au chevron de sable, accompagné de trois trèfles du même.	Argent, a chevron between 3 trefoils sable. (Assevent, Romeries and Saint-Rémy-Chaussée use the same arms.)
	Attiches	D'or à la bande échiquetée de gueules et d'argent de deux tires.	Or a bend chequy gules and argent of two traits.
	Aubencheul-au-Bac	D'or à une hamaide de gueules.	Gules two fesses within and conjoined to a bordure or.
	Auberchicourt	De sinople au chef d'hermines, à la bordure engrêlée d'argent. Une variante est: D'hermine à une hamaide de gueules chargée de 6 coquilles d'or. La mairie semble actuellement utiliser cette variante, avec un fond vert pour l'hermine tout-à-fait fautif au vu des règles de base de l'héraldique.	
	Aubers	De gueules à la croix d'or.	Gules a cross or.
	Aubigny-au-Bac	D'azur à trois chevrons d'or.	Azure three chevrons or.
	Aubry-du-Hainaut	De sinople semé de billettes d'argent, au lion du même armé et lampassé de gueules brochant sur le tout.	Vert, billetty, a lion argent, armed and langued gules. (Thiant and Aubry-du-Hainaut use the same arms.)
	Auby	Ecartelé: aux 1 et 4, d'argent à l'aigle éployée de sable, becquée et membrée de gueules, aux 2 et 3, contre-écartelé d'or et de sable.	Quarterly 1 and 4: Argent, an eagle sable beaked and membered gules, 2 and 3: quarterly or and sable.
	Auchy-lez-Orchies	D'azur à la bande d'argent, chargée de trois flanchis écotés de gueules.	Azure on a bend argent three saltires couped (raguly?) gules.
	Audencourt; Since 1961 part of Caudry.	D'argent au lion de gueules, surmonté d'un lambel à quatre pendants d'azur.	Argent a lion gules and in chief a label of four points azure.
	Audignies	Bandé d'or et de sinople, au franc-canton d'hermine.	Bendy or and vert a canton ermine.
	Aulnoy-lez-Valenciennes	D'azur à la bande d'or accompagnée de six besants du même mis en orle.	Azure, a bend Or between 6 bezants (Or). (Aulnoy-lez-Valenciennes, Bantouzelle, Briastre, Noyelles-sur-Selle and Potelle use the same arms.)
	Aulnoye-Aymeries	Parti: au 1, chevronné d'or et de gueules de douze pièces (qui est Aulnoye); au 2, d'or à la bande échiquetée d'argent et de gueules de trois tires (qui est Aymeries).	Chevronny or and gules. (Aulnoye) Impaled with or a bend chequy argent and gules of three traits. (Aymeries)
	Avelin	De gueules au chef d'hermine.	Gules a chief ermine.
	Avesnelles	Écartelé: aux 1 et 4, d'argent à trois fasces de gueule (qui est Croÿ); aux 2 et 3, contre-écartelé d'azur à trois fleurs de lis d'or (qui est France) et de gueules (qui est d'Albret); sur le tout du contre-écartelé, d'hermine (qui est Bretagne); et sur le tout de l'écartelé, de gueules à trois roses d'or (qui est Arenberg).	Quarterly 1 and 4: Argent, 3 fesses gules (Croÿ); 2 and 4 Quarterly France and gules, overall an inescutcheon ermine. (Brittany); Over the whole arms an inescutcheon gules thereon three roses or. (Arenberg)
	Avesnes-le-Sec	De sinople au chevron d'argent accompagné de trois étoiles du même.	Vert a chevron argent between three mullets of the same.
	Avesnes-les-Aubert	De gueules à trois lionceaux d'argent couronnés d'or.	Gules, 3 lions argent crowned Or. (Avesnes-les-Aubert, Éclaibes and Inchy use the same arms.)
	Avesnes-sur-Helpe	Bandé d'or et de gueules.	Bendy Or and gules. (Avesnes-sur-Helpe, Cartignies, Damousies, Dimechaux, Dimont, Felleries, Larouillies, Lomme, and Ramousies use the same arms.)
	Awoingt	D'argent à une bande d'azur chargée de trois coquilles d'or posées dans le sens de la bande.	Argent, on a bend azure, 3 escallops bendwise Or. (Awoingt and Montrécourt use the same arms.)

== B ==
Image	Name of Commune	French blazon	English blazon
	Bachant	De gueules au chevron d'or, accompagné de trois trèfles d'argent.	Gules, a chevron Or between 3 trefoils argent. (Bachant and Vieux-Mesnil use the same arms.)
	Bachy	De gueules, au chef d'or, chargé à dextre d'un lion de sable.	Gules on a chief or in dexter a lion sable.
	Bailleul	De gueules à la croix de vair, les cloches appointées en cœur..	Gules a cross vair, meeting in point in the center.
	Baisieux	Bandé d'or et d'azur.	Bendy Or and azure. (Baisieux, Bouvines and Cysoing use the same arms.)
	Baives	De gueules à deux fasces bretessées et contre-bretessées d'argent; au franc-canton de gueules à trois pals de vair et au chef d'or.	Gules, 2 fesses embattled counterembattled argent, overall on a canton Gules, 3 pales vair and a chief Or. (Baives and Willies use the same arms.)
	Bambecque	D'argent au lion de sable, armé et lampassé de gueules.	Argent a lion sable armed and langued gules.
	Banteux	D'or à un loup passant d'azur.	Or a wolf passant azure.
	Bantigny	De gueules à la bande d'argent chargée de trois merlettes de sable.	Gules on a bend argent three martlets sable.
	Bantouzelle	D'azur à la bande d'or accompagnée de six besants du même mis en orle.	Azure, a bend Or between 6 bezants (Or). (Aulnoy-lez-Valenciennes, Bantouzelle, Briastre, Noyelles-sur-Selle and Potelle use the same arms.)
	La Bassée	De gueules à une demi-fleur de lys d'argent défaillante à dextre.	Gules a demi fleur de lys issuant from the center line argent.
	Bauvin	D'or, à la croix ancrée et alaisée de gueules.	Or, a cross moline gules. (Annœullin, Bauvin and Mons-en-Pévèle use the same arms.)
	Bavay	D'argent au lion de gueules chargé sur l'épaule d'un écu d'or au lion de sable.	Argent a lion gules charged on its shoulder with an inescutcheon or a lion sable.
	Bavinchove	Burelé d'or et d'azur de douze pièces.	Barry or and azure.
	Bazuel	De gueules à une rose tigée et feuillée d'argent.	Gules, a rose slipped and leaved argent. (Bazuel, Maretz and Saint-Benin use the same arms.)
	Beaucamps-Ligny; In 1927 Beaucamps and Ligny-en-Weppes merged.	De sinople à la fasce d'hermines.	Vert, a fess ermine. (Oignies, Beaucamps-Ligny, Estrées, Gruson and Wicres use the same arms.)
	Beaudignies	De gueules au croissant d'argent, accompagné de huit billettes du même en orle.	Gules a crescent argent between eight billets of the same in orle.
	Beaufort	De gueules à trois écussons d'argent.	Gules three inescutcheons argent.
	Beaumont-en-Cambrésis	De gueules au trois lionceaux d'argent. Selon la carte de Borrekens on trouve: D'or à trois chevrons de gueules, qui est le blason du Chapitre de Saint-Aubert de Cambrai.	Gules three lions argent.
	Beaurain	Vairé d'or et d'azur.	Vairy Or and azure. (Beaurain, Nieurlet and Vendegies-au-Bois use the same arms.)
	Beaurepaire-sur-Sambre	D'azur à la fasce d'or.	Azure, a fess Or. (Beaurepaire-sur-Sambre, Borre, Morbecque, Prisches, Cazilhac and Aubière use the same arms.)
	Beaurieux	De sable, au chef denché d'or.	Sable a chief indented or.
	Beauvois-en-Cambrésis	De sinople à une coupe couverte d'or.	Vert a covered cup or.
	Bellaing	Ecartelé: aux 1 et 4, d'argent à la fasce de sable, aux 2 et 3, d'or à la croix ancrée de sable.	Quarterly 1&4: Argent, a fess sable; 2&3: Or, a cross moline sable. (Bellaing, Oisy and Preux-au-Bois use the same arms.)
	Bellignies	Écartelé, aux 1 et 4 : d'or à cinq cotices de gueules, au canton du même chargé d'une étoile d'or; aux 2 et 3 : échiqueté d'or et de gueules de 4 tires.	Quarterly 1 and 4: Or five bendlets gules, and on a canton of the same a mullet or; 2 and 3 chequy or and gules of four traits.
	Bérelles	De gueules à cinq fleurs de lis d'or mises en sautoir.	Gules in saltire five fleurs de lys.
	Bergues	Parti: au premier d'argent au lion contourné de sable lampassé de gueules, au second à la fasce de sable et au franc-quartier d'or chargé d'un lion aussi de sable et d'une bordure de gueules.	Argent a lion contourny sable langued gules impaled with argent a fess sable and on a canton or a lion sable within a bordure gules.
	Berlaimont	Fascé de vair et de gueules.	Barry vair and gules.
	Bermerain	Ecartelé: aux 1 et 4, d'argent à trois fasces de gueules; aux 2 et 3, d'argent à trois doloires de gueules, les deux du chef adossées.	Quarterly 1&4: Argent, 3 fesses gules; 2&3: Argent, 3 wagoner's axes top 2 addorsed gules. (Bermerain, Étrœungt, Féron, Ferrière-la-Grande, Lez-Fontaine, Rousies, Solre-le-Château and Solrinnes use the same arms.)
	Bermeries	D'argent au chef de gueules et sur le tout un arbre de sinople accosté de six poissons d'azur, trois à dextre mis en barre, trois à sénestre mis en bande.	Argent a chief gules overall a tree vert between six fish azure the dexter three bendwise sinister and the sinister three bendwise.
	Bersée	D'or à la croix de gueules, cantonnée de seize alérions d'azur.	Or, a cross gules between 16 alerions azure. (the Montmorency family and the communes of Bersée and Damville use the same arms.)
	Bersillies	D'or à trois chevrons de sable.	Or, 3 chevrons sable. (Bersillies, Boeschepe, Boussières-sur-Sambre, Colleret, Cousolre, Flaumont-Waudrechies, Hautmont, Limont-Fontaine, Lompret, Masny, Neuville-en-Avesnois and Saint-Rémy-du-Nord use the same arms.)
	Berthen	D'or à la bordure d'azur, et en cœur un écusson d'argent, bordé d'azur et chargé d'un lion de gueules, armé, lampassé et couronné d'or.	Or, a bordure azure, and on an inescutcheon argent, a lion gules armed, langued and crowned Or, within a bordure azure. (Caëstre and Berthen use the same arms.)
	Bertry	D'azur au chevron d'or, accompagné en chef de deux étoiles à six rais, et en pointe d'un trèfle du même.	Azure, a chevron between 2 mullets of 6 and a trefoil Or. (Bertry and Troisvilles use the same arms.)
	Béthencourt	De sable à dix losanges d'or accolées et aboutées, 3, 3, 3, et 1.	Sable ten lozenges conjoined or 3, 3, 3, and 1.
	Bettignies	D'or au chef de sable.	Or a chief sable.
	Bettrechies	D'or à la croix engrêlée de gueules.	Or, a cross engrailed gules. (Artres, Bettrechies, Cerfontaine, Denain, Eth, Lesquin, Obies, Quérénaing, Semousies, Wambrechies and Warlaing use the same arms.)
	Beugnies	De gueules à trois pals de vair, au chef d'or.	Gules, 3 pales vair, and a chief Or. (Beugnies and Le Favril use the same arms.)
	Beuvrages	Ecartelé : aux 1 et 4, d'azur à trois flèches d'or, en bande, rangées en barre, aux 2 et 3, bandé d'argent et de gueules.	Quarterly 1 and 4: Azure in bend sinister three arrows bendwise or; 2 and 3: Bendy argent and gules.
	Beuvry-la-Forêt	D'or à une escarboucle de sable, chargée en cœur d'un rubis de gueules.	Or, on an escarbuncle sable a ruby gules. (Abscon, Beuvry-la-Forêt, Erre, Fenain, Marchiennes, Ronchin, Tilloy-lez-Marchiennes and Wandignies-Hamage use the same arms.)
	Bévillers	D'azur à un dragon d'or, lampassé de gueules, s'essorant en fasce.	Azure, a wyvern Or, langued gules. (Bévillers, Honnechy, Ramillies and Wambaix use the same arms.)
	Bierne	D'argent à la croix de gueules, cantonnée de douze merlettes du même mises en orle.	Argent a cross between in orle twelve martlets gules.
	Bissezeele	D'or, au lion de sable, lampassé de gueules, couronné d'or, portant au cou un collier avec une croix du même pendante sur sa poitrine.	Or a lion sable langued gules crowned and collared or and thereon his chest a pendant cross of the same.
	Blaringhem	Ecartelé : aux 1 et 4, d'azur au chevron d'or accompagné de trois étoiles à cinq rais du même, aux 2 et 3, d'or au chevron d'azur, accompagné de trois têtes de Maure de sable, tortillées d'argent.	Quarterly 1 and 4: Azure a chevron between three mullets or; 2 and 3: Or a chevron azure between three Moorsheads sable with headband argent.
	Blécourt	D'or à trois lionceaux de sable.	Or three lions sable.
	Boeschepe	D'or à trois chevrons de sable.	Or, 3 chevrons sable. (Bersillies, Boeschepe, Boussières-sur-Sambre, Colleret, Cousolre, Flaumont-Waudrechies, Hautmont, Limont-Fontaine, Lompret, Masny, Neuville-en-Avesnois and Saint-Rémy-du-Nord use the same arms.)
	Boëseghem	De gueules à trois clefs d'argent, mises en pal, 2 et 1, le panneton en haut et à dextre.	Gules, 3 keys argent. (Boëseghem and Camphin-en-Carembault use the same arms.)
	Bois-Grenier	Écartelé; au 1er quartier : d'or, au lion de sable, à la bande componée d'argent et de gueules brochant sur le tout; au 2e : d'argent, à une fleur de lys de gueules, accompagnée en chef d'un soleil d'or à dextre et d'une lune en décours du même à senestre; au 3e : d'azur, à une chapelle d'argent avec flèche; au 4e : de gueules, au lion d'argent armé et lampassé d'or.	Quarterly 1: Or a lion sable overall a bend compony argent and gules; 2: Argent a fleur de lys gules and in chief a sun or and a descrescent of the same; 3: Azure a chapel with a steeple argent; 4: Gules a lion argent armed and langued or.
	Bollezeele	D'or au lion de sable, armé et lampassé de gueules.	Or, a lion sable armed and langued gules. ('Flanders' and the communes of Thourotte, Crépy-en-Valois, Bollezeele, Feignies, Flines-lez-Raches and Wormhout use the same arms.)
	Bondues	D'or au franc-canton de sable.	Or a canton sable.
	Borre	D'azur à la fasce d'or.	Azure, a fess Or. (Beaurepaire-sur-Sambre, Borre, Morbecque, Prisches, Cazilhac and Aubière use the same arms.)
	Bouchain	Bien que le blasonnement traditionnel soit: D'argent à une porte crénelée de gueules. les écus portent une tour de gueules, plutôt qu'une porte crènelée. La tour est ronde, crénelée de cinq pièces, ajourée et maçonnée de sable et ouverte du champ sur une gravure des albums de Croÿ datant de 1609. Elle est carrée, couverte et flanquée de quatre tours sur le sceau ad causas des échevins au moyen-âge et sur l'écu utilisé par la commune.	Argent a tower gules.
	Boulogne-sur-Helpe	D'argent à trois fasces de gueules.	Argent, 3 fesses gules. (Boulogne-sur-Helpe and Petit-Fayt use the same arms.)
	Bourbourg	Au chef de Flandre, surmontant les trois tierces d'or. D'azur à trois tierces d'or, au chef d'or chargé d'un lion de sable.	Azure three triple barrulets or and on a chief of the same a lion sable. (Chief of Flanders)
	Bourghelles	D'argent au chef de gueules.	Argent, a chief gules. (Bourghelles and Hem use the same arms.)
	Boursies	D'or à trois lionceaux d'azur, au chef de gueules chargé d'une Notre-Dame-de-Grâce de carnation à mi-corps, vêtue de gueules et d'azur, et tenant à senestre l'Enfant Jésus.	Or, 3 lions azure, on a chief gules, a demi-'Notre-Dame-de-Grâce de carnation' issuant from the line of division, vested gules and azure and holding in her left arm the Baby Jesus. (Boursies, Cattenières, Carnières, Estrun, Maresches, Onnaing, Ors, Orsinval, Thun-l'Évêque and originally, Notre-Dame de Cambrai, use the same arms.)
	Bousbecque	De sinople à trois tierce-feuilles d'or.	Vert three stemless trefoils or.
	Bousies	D'azur à la croix d'argent.	Azure, a cross argent. (Bousies and Fontaine-au-Bois use the same arms.)
	Boussières-en-Cambrésis	Coupé: au 1 d'azur à une croix de calvaire d'or, entrelacée d'une couronne d'épines du même; au 2, de gueules à trois fleurs de lis d'or.	Per fess 1: Azure, a latin cross enfiled of a crown of thorns Or; 2: Gules, 3 fleurs de lys Or. (Boussières-en-Cambrésis, Morenchies and Quiévy use the same arms.)
	Boussières-sur-Sambre	D'or à trois chevrons de sable.	Or, 3 chevrons sable. (Bersillies, Boeschepe, Boussières-sur-Sambre, Colleret, Cousolre, Flaumont-Waudrechies, Hautmont, Limont-Fontaine, Lompret, Masny, Neuville-en-Avesnois and Saint-Rémy-du-Nord use the same arms.)
	Boussois	Burelé d'argent et d'azur de douze pièces.	Barry argent and azure. (Boussois, Noyelles-sur-Escaut and Villers-Campeau use the same arms.)
	Bouvignies	D'azur à la bande d'argent.	Azure, a bend argent. (Bouvignies, Jolimetz and Ochtezeele use the same arms.)
	Bouvines	Bandé d'or et d'azur.	Bendy Or and azure. (Baisieux, Bouvines and Cysoing use the same arms.)
	Bray-Dunes	D'azur à l'ancre d'argent, munie de sa gumène du même accompagnée à senestre d'une étoile d'argent à six rayons, au chef d'hermine, à la bande de gueules chargées de trois coquillages d'or. (adopté par délibération du conseil municipal du 22 mars 1953)	Azure an anchor with hawser in sinister chief a mullet of six argent on a chief ermine a bend gules charged with 3 escallops or.
	Briastre	D'azur à la bande d'or, accompagnée de six besants du même mis en orle.	Azure, a bend Or between 6 bezants (Or). (Aulnoy-lez-Valenciennes, Bantouzelle, Briastre, Noyelles-sur-Selle and Potelle use the same arms.)
	Brillon	D'azur semé de fleurs de lys d'or.	Azure, semy de lys Or. = France Ancient (Ansacq, Brillon, Escaudain, Escautpont, Hélesmes, Hérin, Lecelles, Lieu-Saint-Amand, Lourches, Neuville-sur-Escaut, Rosult, Rumegies and Wignehies use the same arms.)
	Brouckerque	D'argent à une fasce de sable chargée de trois quintefeuilles d'or.	Argent on a fess sable three cinqfoils or.
	Broxeele	De gueules au lion d'argent, armé et lampassé d'or.	Gules, a lion argent armed and langued Or. (Broxeele and Rubrouck use the same arms.)
	Bruay-sur-l'Escaut	Coupé: En chef, écartelé : aux 1 et 4, d'or au lion de sable; aux 2 et 3, d'or au lion de gueules; en pointe, d'azur à trois canettes d'argent.	Per fess 1: Quarterly 1 and 4, or a lion sable; 2 and 3, or a lion gules; 2: Azure three ducks argent.
	Bruille-lez-Marchiennes	D'argent à la croix engrêlée de gueules.	Argent, a cross engrailed gules. (Bruille-lez-Marchiennes and Écaillon use the same arms.)
	Bruille-Saint-Amand	D'or à la croix de gueules.	Or, a cross gules. (Bruille-Saint-Amand, Flines-lès-Mortagne, Mortagne-du-Nord and Nivelle use the same arms.)
	Brunémont	Fascé d'argent et d'azur, la première fasce d'azur chargée de trois cœurs d'or.	Per fess argent and azure in the chief a bend azure charged with three hearts or.
	Bry	D'or à une grappe de raisin d'azur, tigée et feuillée de sinople.	Or a bunch of grapes azure slipped and leaved vert.
	Bugnicourt	D'hermines à la croix de gueules chargée de cinq roses d'or.	Ermine, on a cross gules, 5 roses Or. (Aniche, Bugnicourt, and Rieulay use the same arms.)
	Busigny	Parti: au premier d'or aux trois chevrons de gueules soutenus d'une croix de guerre 1939-1945 pendante au naturel, au second d'or aux trois fasces de gueules semées de billettes du champ	Or three chevrons gules and in base a "Croix de guerre 1939-1945" proper impaled with or three fesses gules billety or.
	Buysscheure	De gueules au chevron d'or, accompagné de trois coquilles du même, et une bordure aussi d'or.	Gules a chevron between three escallops all within a bordure or.

== C ==
Image	Name of Commune	French blazon	English blazon
	Caëstre	D'or à la bordure d'azur, et en cœur un écusson d'argent, bordé d'azur, et chargé d'un lion de gueules, armé, lampassé et couronné d'or.	Or, a bordure azure, and on an inescutcheon argent, a lion gules armed, langued and crowned Or, within a bordure azure. (Caëstre and Berthen use the same arms.)
	Cagnoncles	Parti émanché d'argent et de gueules de dix pièces.	Per pale highly indented argent and gules. (Cagnoncles, Landas, Raucourt-au-Bois and Thun-Saint-Amand use the same arms.)
	Cambrai	D'or, à l'aigle bicéphale éployée de sable, becquée et membrée de gueules, chargée en cœur d'un écusson d'or à trois lionceaux d'azur Aussi denommé sous: D'or, à un aigle à deux têtes de sable, nimbée, becquée et membrée de gueules, sur l'estomac d'un écusson d'or à trois lionceaux d'azur.	Or a double-headed eagle sable haloed, beaked, and membered gules, surmounting an inescutcheon or 3 lions azure.
	Camphin-en-Carembault	De gueules à trois clefs d'argent mises en pal, le panneton en haut et à dextre.	Gules, 3 keys argent. (Boëseghem and Camphin-en-Carembault use the same arms.)
	Camphin-en-Pévèle	D'azur à sept besants d'or, 3, 3, et 1	Azure seven bezants or 3, 3, and 1.
	Cantaing-sur-Escaut	D'argent à trois lionceaux d'azur, armés et lampassés de gueules.	Argent three lions azure armed and langed gules.
	Cantin	De sinople à un aigle d'argent volant vers un soleil d'or posé en chef à dextre.	Vert in dexter base an eagle volant bendwise argent and in canton a sun or.
	Capelle	D'azur semé de fleurs de lis d'or, et un cerf passant d'argent brochant sur le tout.	Azure semy de lys Or, a stag argent. (Capelle, Loffre, Neuville-Saint-Rémy, Pecquencourt, and Vred use the same arms.)
	Capinghem	De sable au lion d'argent.	Sable a lion argent.
	Cappelle-Brouck	De gueules à deux clefs d'argent passées en sautoir.	Gules two keys argent addorsed in saltire.
	Cappelle-en-Pévèle	Ecartelé d'or et de gueules.	Quarterly Or and gules. (Cappelle-en-Pévèle and Roucourt use the same arms.)
.	Cappelle-la-Grande	D'argent semé de croisettes recroisetées au pied fiché de sable, à deux bars adossés du même, et en chef un écusson d'or au chevron de sable.	Argent semy of cross-crosslets fitchy, 2 fesses sable, and in chief an inescutcheon Or a chevron sable.
	Carnières	le blason est: D'or à trois lionceaux d'azur, au chef de gueules chargé d'une Notre-Dame-de-Grâce de carnation à mi-corps, tenant à senestre l'Enfant Jésus, et vêtue de gueules et d'azur.	Or, 3 lions azure, on a chief gules, a demi-'Notre-Dame-de-Grâce de carnation' issuant from the line of division, vested gules and azure and holding in her left arm the Baby Jesus. (Boursies, Cattenières, Carnières, Estrun, Maresches, Onnaing, Ors, Orsinval, Thun-l'Évêque and originally, Notre-Dame de Cambrai, use the same arms.)
	Carnin	D'argent à trois têtes de lion de gueules, lampassées et couronnées d'azur.	Argent three lion heads gules langued and crowned azure.
	Cartignies	Bandé d'or et de gueules.	Bendy Or and gules. (Avesnes-sur-Helpe, Cartignies, Damousies, Dimechaux, Dimont, Felleries, Larouillies, Lomme, and Ramousies use the same arms.)
	Cassel	D'azur à une épée d'or accostée de deux clefs adossées du même L'ancien blason était: D'or à l'épée de sable accostée de deux clefs adossées du même	Azure, a sword between two keys addorsed Or.
	Le Cateau-Cambrésis	D'azur au château d'argent, sommé de trois tourelles du même.	Azure a castle of three towers argent.
	Catillon-sur-Sambre	De gueules au château fort d'argent chargé sur sa porte d'un "K" de sable.	Gules a castle argent on its door charged with the letter "K" sable.
	Cattenières	D'or à trois lionceaux d'azur, au chef de gueules chargé d'une Notre-Dame-de-Grâce de carnation à mi-corps, tenant à senestre l'Enfant Jésus, et vêtue de gueules et d'azur.	Or, 3 lions azure, on a chief gules, a demi-'Notre-Dame-de-Grâce de carnation' issuant from the line of division, vested gules and azure and holding in her left arm the Baby Jesus. (Boursies, Cattenières, Carnières, Estrun, Maresches, Onnaing, Ors, Orsinval, Thun-l'Évêque and originally, Notre-Dame de Cambrai, use the same arms.)
	Caudry	D'argent aux trois feuilles de vivier de gueules. On le retrouve aussi sous le blasonnement: D'argent aux trois feuilles de vivier de sable.	Argent three "vivier" leaves gules.
	Caullery	De gueules à trois écussons d'argent, chargés chacun d'un lion de sable.	Gules three inescutcheons each charged with a lion sable.
	Cauroir	D'azur à l'écusson d'argent, surmonté de trois merlettes d'or rangées en chef.	Azure, an inescutcheon argent, and in chief (in fess) 3 martlets Or. (Cauroir and Salomé use the same arms.)
	Cerfontaine	D'or à la croix engrêlée de gueules.	Or, a cross engrailed gules. (Artres, Bettrechies, Cerfontaine, Denain, Eth, Lesquin, Obies, Quérénaing, Semousies, Wambrechies and Warlaing use the same arms.)
	La Chapelle-d'Armentières	D’argent à une fleurs de lys de gueules, accompagné en chef, à dextre d’un soleil non figuré d'or et à senestre d’un croissant posé en barre du même, un portail d’église de sable brochant en cœur.	Argent a fleurs de lys gules between in chief a sun or and a crescent bendwise sinister of the same, in center point overall a church portal sable.
	Château-l'Abbaye	De gueules au senestrochère de carnation mouvant du flanc dextre, habillé d'or et tenant une rose au naturel feuillée de sinople.	Gules a left hand issuant from dexter vested or maintaining a rose or slipped and leaved vert.
	Chemy	De gueules, à un Saint Piat vétu d'ornements sacerdotaux, tenant en ses mains le sommet de sa tête coupée, et ayant à ses pieds un cerf couché, le tout d'or.	Gules Saint Piat in sacerdotal vestments holding in his hands the cut off top of his own head, and at his feet a stag couchant or.
	Chéreng	De gueules au chef d'or, chargé d'un lion de sable.	Gules on a chief or a lion rampant sable.
	Choisies	D'hermine à un écusson de sable semé de billettes d'or et chargé sur le tout d'un lion du même, armé et lampassé de gueules.	Ermine on an inescutcheon sable semy of billets or a lion of the same armed and langued gules.
	Clairfayts	D'argent à la croix d'azur.	Argent, a cross azure. (Croix, Clairfayts and Marcq-en-Barœul use the same arms.)
	Clary	D'azur à sept besants d'or, 3, 3, et 1, au chef du même.	Azure, 7 bezants (3,3,1) and a chief Or. (Clary and Illies use the same arms.)
	Cobrieux	D'argent, au chevron de gueules, accompagné de trois croissants de sable.	Argent a chevron gules between three crescents sable.
	Colleret	D'or à trois chevrons de sable.	Or, 3 chevrons sable. (Bersillies, Boeschepe, Boussières-sur-Sambre, Colleret, Cousolre, Flaumont-Waudrechies, Hautmont, Limont-Fontaine, Lompret, Masny, Neuville-en-Avesnois and Saint-Rémy-du-Nord use the same arms.)
	Comines	D'argent à une clef de sable mise en pal, le panneton en haut et à dextre, et accompagnée de cinq quintefeuilles de gueules, deux à dextre, deux à senestre et une en pointe. Comines comme chef-lieu du quartier du Ferrain: De gueules au chevron d'or accompagné de trois coquilles du même et à la bordure aussi d'or.	Argent a key palewise sable between five cinqfoils gules 2, 2, and 1.
	Condé-sur-l'Escaut	D'or à la fasce de gueules.	Or, a fess gules. (Condé-sur-l'Escaut and Haverskerque use the same arms.)
	Coudekerque	D'argent à l'aigle de sable, lampassé de gueules.	Argent an eagle sable langued gules.
	Coudekerque-Branche	De sable à un hérisson d'argent couronné d'or.	Sable a hedgehog argent crowned or.
	Courchelettes	D'azur au chevron d'or accompagné de trois étoiles à cinq rais du même.	Azure a chevron between three mullets or of five points.
	Cousolre	D'or à trois chevrons de sable.	Or, 3 chevrons sable. (Bersillies, Boeschepe, Boussières-sur-Sambre, Colleret, Cousolre, Flaumont-Waudrechies, Hautmont, Limont-Fontaine, Lompret, Masny, Neuville-en-Avesnois and Saint-Rémy-du-Nord use the same arms.)
	Coutiches	De gueules au chef d'or, chargé de trois molettes de sable.	Gules on a chief or three mullets pierced sable.
	Craywick	De gueules à une escarboucle pommetée et fleurdelisée d'or, la branche du milieu terminée en chef par une crosse du même; à la bordure componée d'argent et de sable.	Gules, an escarbuncle pommy and fleury Or, the middle branch ending in a crozier Or, all within a bordure compony argent and sable. (Craywick and Saint-Momelin use the same arms.)
	Crespin	D'azur fretté d'argent.	Azure fretty argent.
	Crèvecœur-sur-l'Escaut	D'or à trois croissants de gueules.	Or, 3 crescents gules. (Anneux, Crèvecœur-sur-l'Escaut, Rumilly-en-Cambrésis, Saint-Souplet and Wargnies-le-Petit use the same arms.)
	Crochte	De sable au lion d'or.	Sable a lion or.
	Croix	D'argent à la croix d'azur.	Argent, a cross azure. (Croix, Clairfayts and Marcq-en-Barœul use the same arms.)
	Croix-Caluyau	De sable à trois croisettes d'or.	Sable three crosses or couped.
	Cuincy	De sable à la bande d'or.	Sable, a bend Or. (Cuincy and Féchain use the same arms.)
	Curgies	D'argent à une truie de sable passant sur une terrasse de sinople.	Argent, a sow passant sable on a base vert. (Curgies and Émerchicourt use the same arms.)
	Cuvillers	De gueules à la bande d'or.	Gules, a bend Or. (the family Duke of Noailles and the communes of Noailles, Cuvillers, Tonnerre, Villespy, Crémarest and Vernoil-le-Fourrier use the same arms.)
	Cysoing	Bandé d'or et d'azur.	Bendy Or and azure. (Baisieux, Bouvines and Cysoing use the same arms.)

== See also ==
- Armorial of the Communes of Nord (D–H)
- Armorial of the Communes of Nord (I–P)
- Armorial of the Communes of Nord (Q–Z)
