= Borre, Nord =

Borre
- Commune
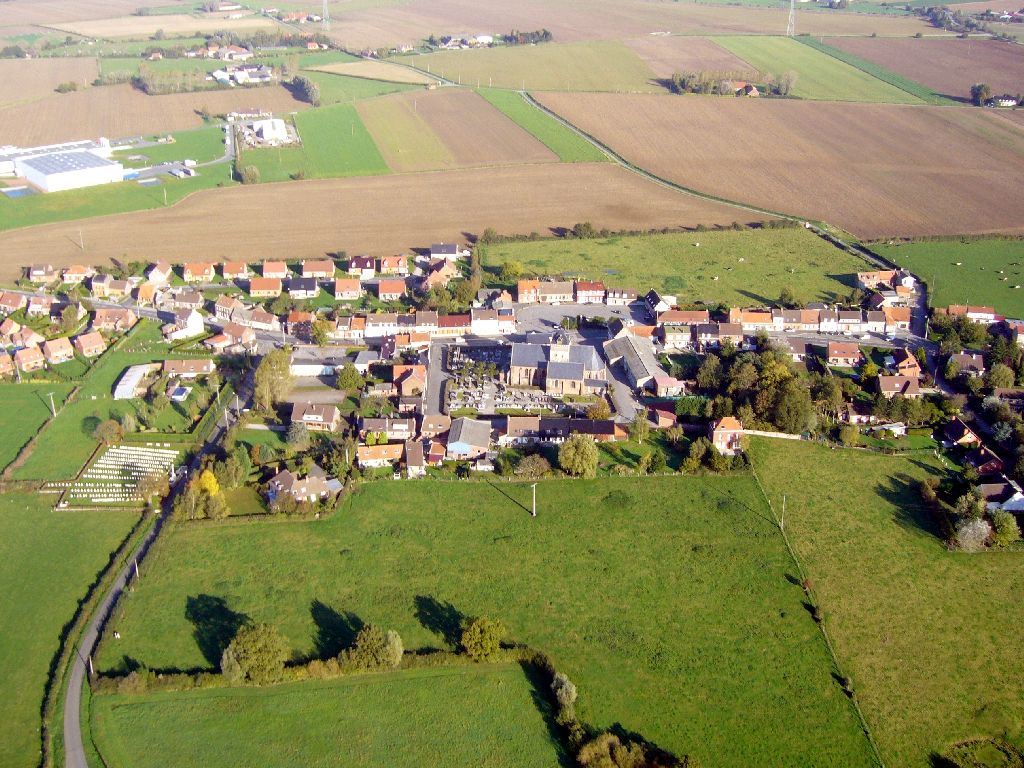
- An aerial view of Borre

- Coat of arms
- Location of Borre
- Location within France Location within Hauts-de-France
- Coordinates: 50°43′48″N 2°34′59″E
- Country: France
- Region: Hauts-de-France
- Department: Nord
- Arrondissement: Dunkerque
- Canton: Bailleul
- Intercommunality: CA Cœur de Flandre

Government
  - Mayor (2020–2026): Bernadette Popelier
- Area^{1}: 5.96 km^{2} (2.30 sq mi)
- Elevation: 20 m (66 ft)
- Highest elevation: 36 m (118 ft)
- Lowest elevation: 17 m (56 ft)
- Population (2023): 553
  - Density: 92.8/km^{2} (240/sq mi)
- Time zone: UTC+01:00 (CET)
  - Summer (DST): UTC+02:00 (CEST)
- INSEE/Postal code: 59091 /59190
- ^{1} French Land Register data, which excludes lakes, ponds, glaciers > 1 km^{2} (0.386 sq mi or 247 acres) and river estuaries.

Borre (French pronunciation: [bɔʁ]) is a commune in the Nord department in northern France.

== History ==
The Borre British Cemetery is located in this village, in route de Sec-Bois. It contains 370 graves from the First World War, of which 129 are British, 238 Australian and 3 German.

In 1940, one of the first German planes damaged in the north of France crashed in Borre. The whole population came out to see the aircraft. Despite the warnings of the crew, who had been captured and locked in the town hall, dozens were killed when the bombs exploded.

== Population ==
Historical population
Year	Pop.	±% p.a.
1968	455	—
1975	419	−1.17%
1982	465	+1.50%
1990	473	+0.21%
1999	540	+1.48%
2007	572	+0.72%
2012	588	+0.55%
2017	591	+0.10%
2023	553	−1.10%
Source: INSEE

== Heraldry ==
Arms of Borre	The arms of Borre are blazoned : Azure, a fess Or. (Beaurepaire-sur-Sambre, Borre, Morbecque, Prisches, Cazilhac and Aubière use the same arms.)

== See also ==
- Communes of the Nord department
