= Prisches =

- Commune
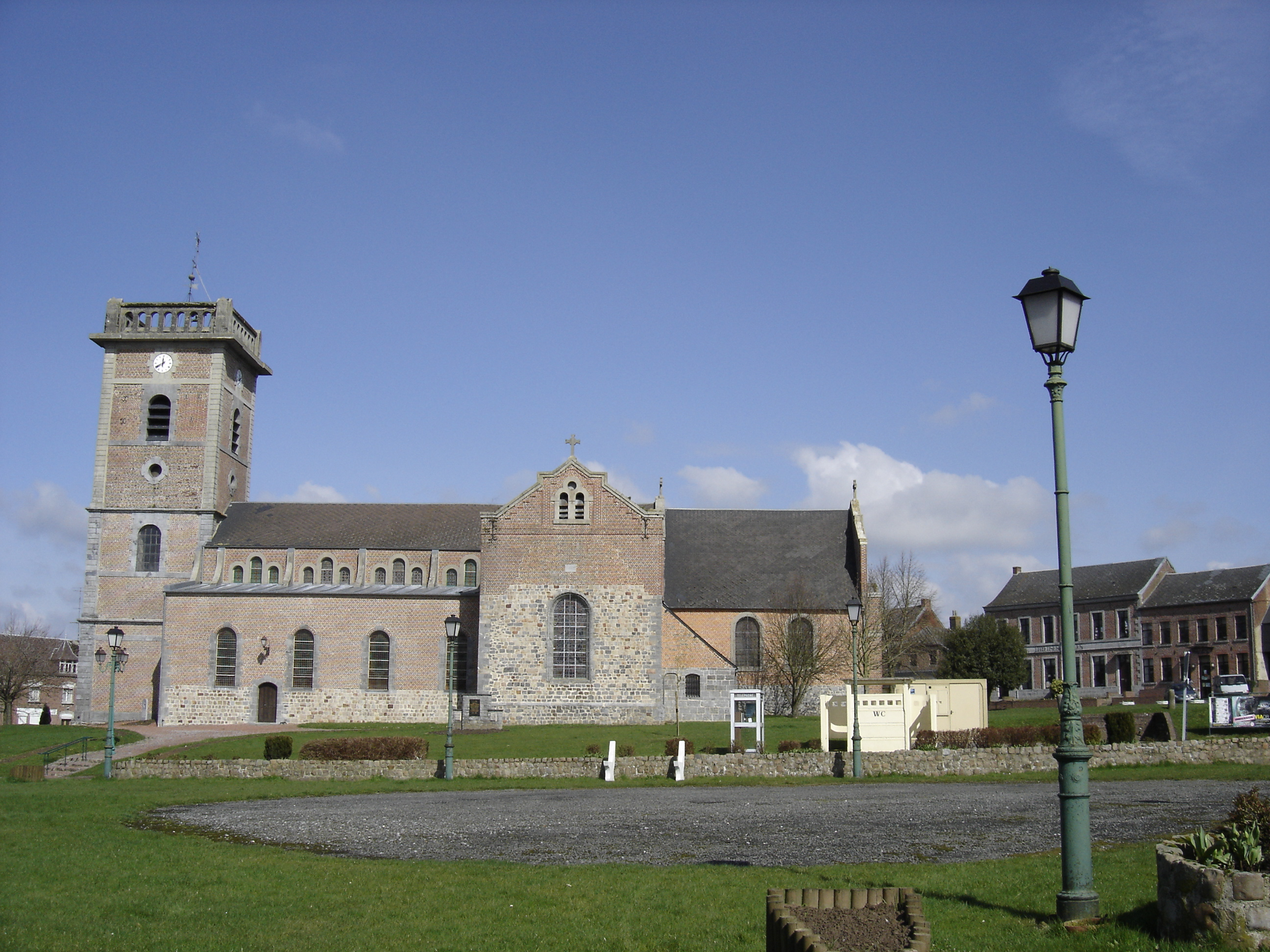
- The church in Prisches

- Coat of arms
- Location of Prisches
- Location within France Location within Hauts-de-France
- Coordinates: 50°04′51″N 3°46′03″E
- Country: France
- Region: Hauts-de-France
- Department: Nord
- Arrondissement: Avesnes-sur-Helpe
- Canton: Avesnes-sur-Helpe
- Intercommunality: Cœur de l'Avesnois

Government
  - Mayor (2020–2026): Jean-Claude Fovez
- Area^{1}: 23.11 km^{2} (8.92 sq mi)
- Highest elevation: 202 m (663 ft)
- Lowest elevation: 153 m (502 ft)
- Population (2023): 1,000
  - Density: 43/km^{2} (110/sq mi)
- Time zone: UTC+01:00 (CET)
  - Summer (DST): UTC+02:00 (CEST)
- INSEE/Postal code: 59474 /59550
- ^{1} French Land Register data, which excludes lakes, ponds, glaciers > 1 km^{2} (0.386 sq mi or 247 acres) and river estuaries.

Prisches (French pronunciation: [pʁiʃ]) is a commune in the Nord department in northern France.

== History ==
Catharina Trico, born at Prisches (then part of the Spanish Netherlands) emigrated in the early 17th Century to Amsterdam. On 13 January 1624, at the age of 18, she married a fellow Walloon immigrant, Joris Raparlie from Valenciennes, the record of their marriage surviving in Amsterdam archives. The two of them soon afterwards boarded a Dutch ship bound for North America and were among the founders and original inhabitants of New Amsterdam - which eventually became the present New York City. Further surviving documents indicate that Catharina and Joris had eleven children, that he died in 1662 but that she was still alive in 1680 - when an English missionary encountered her on Long Island as an old matriarch with 145 descendants. Genealogists estimate that more than a million people now living, in the US and elsewhere, can trace their descent to her.

== Heraldry ==
Arms of Prisches	The arms of Prisches are blazoned : Azure, a fess Or. (Beaurepaire-sur-Sambre, Borre, Morbecque, Prisches, Cazilhac and Aubière use the same arms.)

== See also ==
- Communes of the Nord department
