= Morbecque =

Morbecque Moerbeke
- Commune
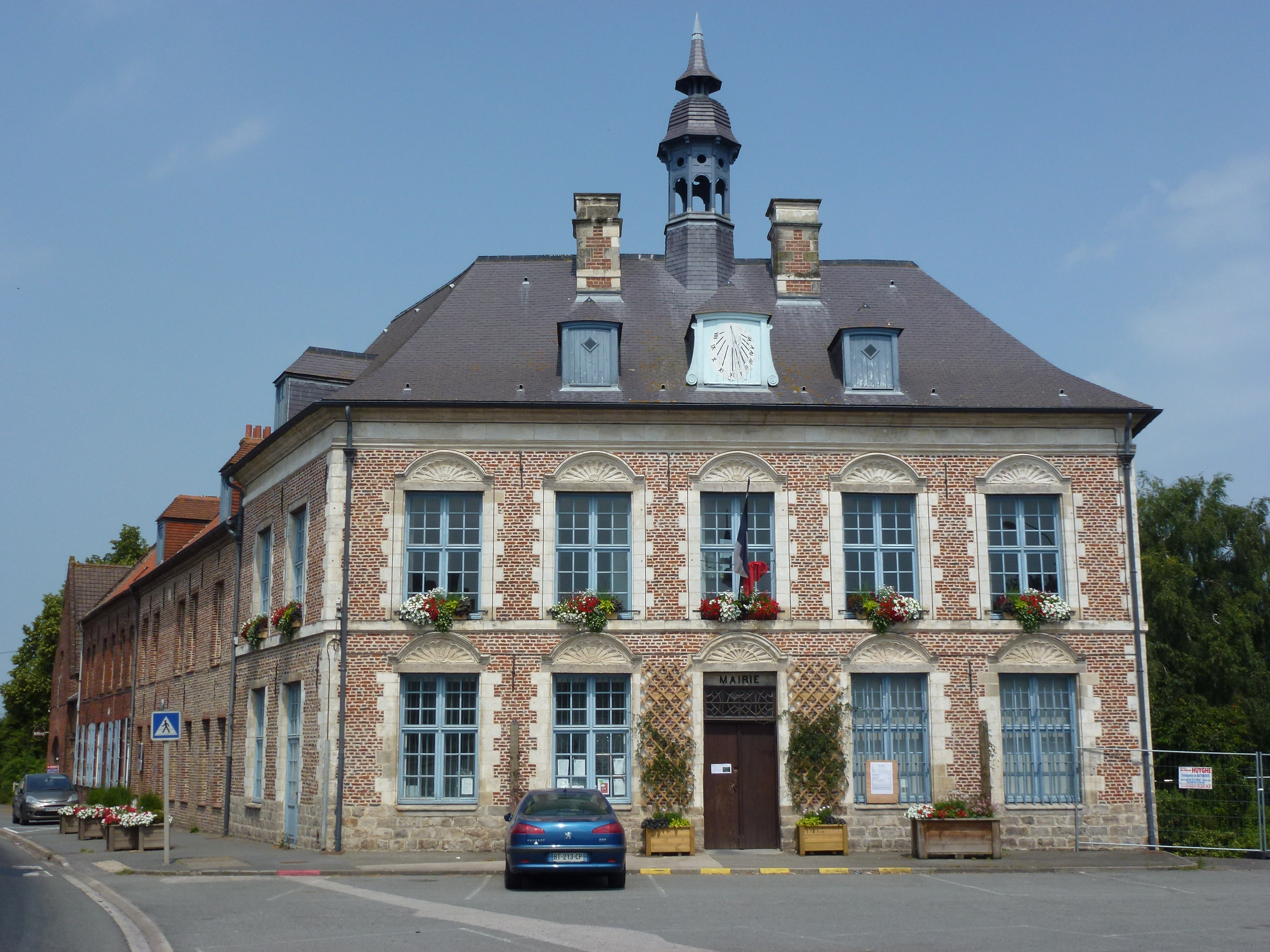
- The town hall in Morbecque

- Coat of arms
- Location of Morbecque
- Location within France Location within Hauts-de-France
- Coordinates: 50°41′39″N 2°31′06″E
- Country: France
- Region: Hauts-de-France
- Department: Nord
- Arrondissement: Dunkerque
- Canton: Hazebrouck
- Intercommunality: CA Cœur de Flandre

Government
  - Mayor (2020–2026): Jérôme Darques
- Area^{1}: 44.34 km^{2} (17.12 sq mi)
- Elevation: 34 m (112 ft)
- Highest elevation: 69 m (226 ft)
- Lowest elevation: 15 m (49 ft)
- Population (2023): 2,573
  - Density: 58.03/km^{2} (150.3/sq mi)
- Demonym: Morbecquois (es)
- Time zone: UTC+01:00 (CET)
  - Summer (DST): UTC+02:00 (CEST)
- INSEE/Postal code: 59416 /59190
- ^{1} French Land Register data, which excludes lakes, ponds, glaciers > 1 km^{2} (0.386 sq mi or 247 acres) and river estuaries.

Morbecque (Dutch: Moerbeke) is a commune in the Nord department in northern France.

== Population ==
Historical population
Year	Pop.	±% p.a.
1968	2,116	—
1975	2,437	+2.04%
1982	2,577	+0.80%
1990	2,541	−0.18%
1999	2,669	+0.55%
2007	2,702	+0.15%
2012	2,620	−0.61%
2017	2,538	−0.63%
2023	2,573	+0.23%
Source: INSEE

== Heraldry ==
Arms of Morbecque	The arms of Morbecque are blazoned: Azure, a fess Or. (Beaurepaire-sur-Sambre, Borre, Morbecque, Prisches, Cazilhac and Aubière use the same arms.)

== See also ==
- Communes of the Nord department
