= Beaurepaire-sur-Sambre =

- Commune
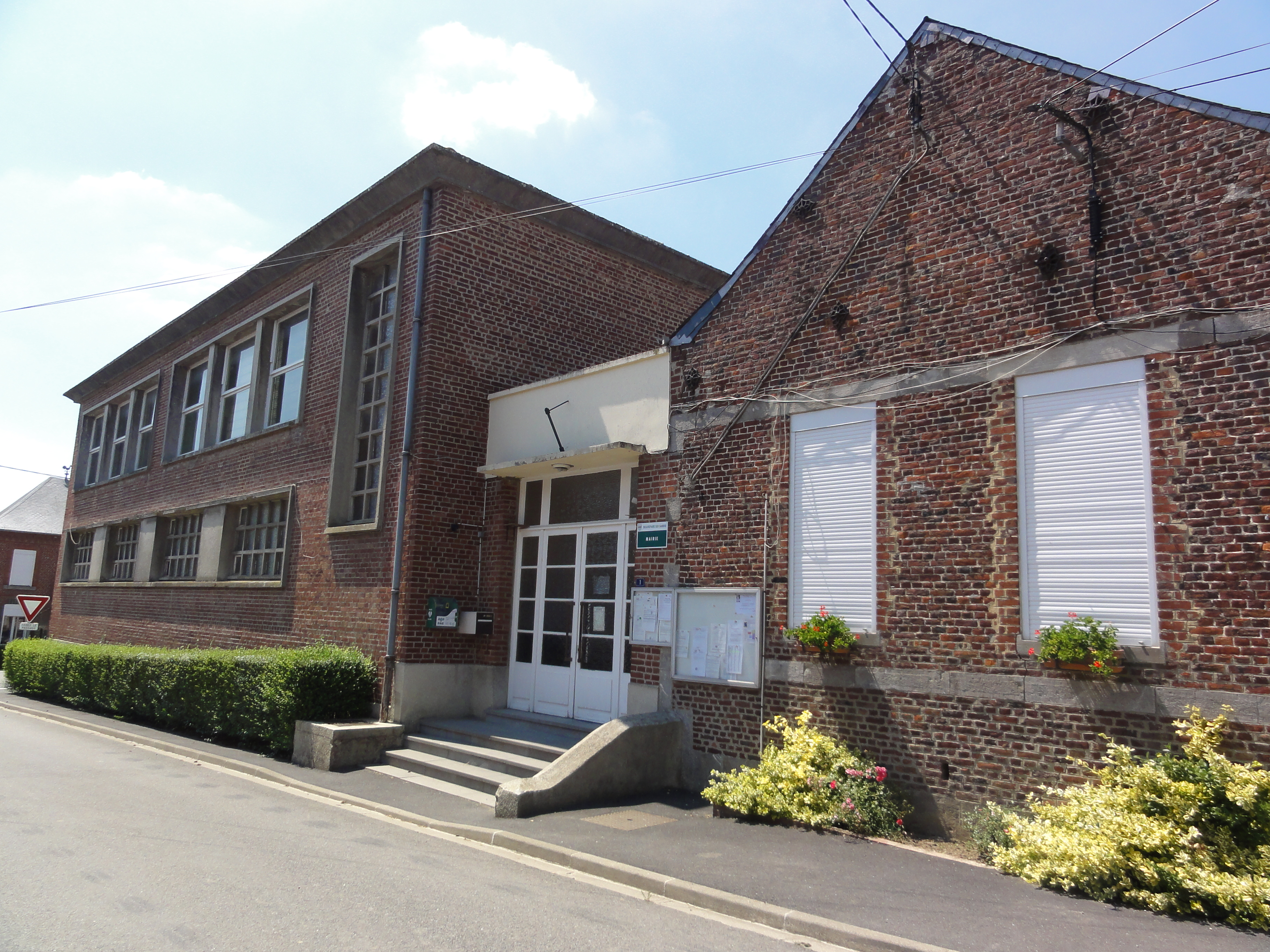
- The town hall in Beaurepaire-sur-Sambre

- Coat of arms
- Location of Beaurepaire-sur-Sambre
- Location within France Location within Hauts-de-France
- Coordinates: 50°03′43″N 3°47′44″E
- Country: France
- Region: Hauts-de-France
- Department: Nord
- Arrondissement: Avesnes-sur-Helpe
- Canton: Avesnes-sur-Helpe
- Intercommunality: Cœur de l'Avesnois

Government
  - Mayor (2020–2026): Pierrick Forêt
- Area^{1}: 7.86 km^{2} (3.03 sq mi)
- Elevation: 180 m (590 ft)
- Highest elevation: 211 m (692 ft)
- Lowest elevation: 166 m (545 ft)
- Population (2023): 272
  - Density: 34.6/km^{2} (89.6/sq mi)
- Time zone: UTC+01:00 (CET)
  - Summer (DST): UTC+02:00 (CEST)
- INSEE/Postal code: 59061 /59550
- ^{1} French Land Register data, which excludes lakes, ponds, glaciers > 1 km^{2} (0.386 sq mi or 247 acres) and river estuaries.

Beaurepaire-sur-Sambre (French pronunciation: [boʁpɛʁ syʁ sɑ̃bʁ], literally Beaurepaire on Sambre) is a commune in the Nord department in northern France.

== Population ==
Historical population
Year	Pop.	±% p.a.
1968	347	—
1975	327	−0.84%
1982	251	−3.71%
1990	266	+0.73%
1999	258	−0.34%
2007	247	−0.54%
2012	256	+0.72%
2017	260	+0.31%
2023	272	+0.75%
Source: INSEE

== Heraldry ==
Arms of Beaurepaire-sur-Sambre	The arms of Beaurepaire-sur-Sambre are blazoned : Azure, a fess Or. (Beaurepaire-sur-Sambre, Borre, Morbecque, Prisches, Cazilhac and Aubière use the same arms.)

== See also ==
- Communes of the Nord department
