= Lamour Mill, Briastre =

Lamour Mill Museum
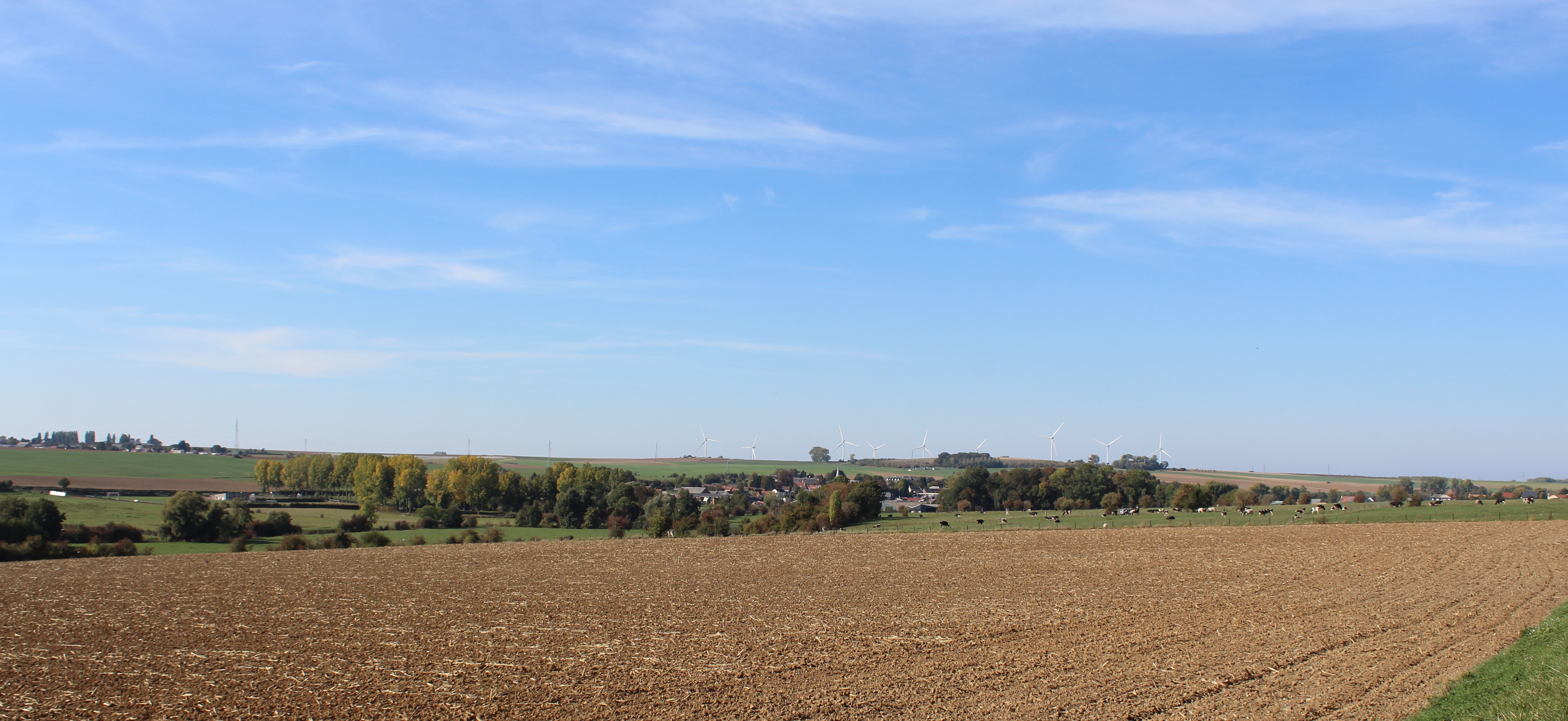
- Briastre - Panorama.
- Established: 1800–1930s
- Location: 17 rue pasteur - 59730 Briastre
- Type: Art museum and Historic site
- Directors: Marie-Anne and Ludovic Belleval.
- Curator: The Bellevals.
- Website: Moulin-Lamour.fr

The Lamour Watermill (French: Le Moulin Lamour) is a museum and arts centre located in Briastre, Hauts-de-France, France. The water-powered mill and its edifices were built in the year 1800. It was originally used for milling grain, but stopped its operations in the 1930s before being converted into a museum by the Belleval family in the late 1990s.

== Owners and curators ==
Marie Anne and Ludovic Belleval are the mill's owners and curators. Both graduated from the École des Beaux-Arts of Cambrai and are Specialized Educators accredited by the French Ministry of National Education, Higher Education and Research. Marie-Anne is a technician, ceramic artist and painter conducting watercolors, acrylic painting, engraving, etching and clay-modeling workshops. Painter and sculptor Ludovic also holds a Bachelor's degree in Visual Arts from the University of Valenciennes. Both have exhibited their œuvres in various venues. The Bellevals are also involved in primary schools located in Solesmes, Caudry, Cambrai, Valenciennes and their surrounding areas. In 1994, Ludovic and Marie-Anne Belleval bought the Lamour mill. . A decision that has been reinforced by the fact that this Briastre mill still has its "right to water". "This right was granted by Me Leroy, notary of Napoléon Bonaparte, and is valid forever." The mill had ceased its activity in 1947. The couple advocates for heritage preservation, the defense of nature and artistic promotion. The couple has completely restored the interior of the mill of 300 m2. The machines are in working order but it is necessary to give them life by replacing a water wheel (French: Roue à aubes) and connect it to the different mechanisms.

== The watermill ==
The Lamour mill is the last watermill in the entire Selle valley that remains open to the public. It produces oil and flour using three 5-meter-high (in diameter) paddle wheels. In 2014, the 'Selle Basin Joint Union' in charge of watercourses management announced that eight watermills and dams, including the Lamour mill, would disappear in 2015 on the river affluent of the Scheldt in order to comply with the implementation of European regulations. Northern Fishing Federation director, Emmanuel Petit argued that "The more rivers keep their profile, the more the impact of floods is mitigated. This also allows the fish as a good ecological indicator of the river's state to go up the Selle River to reproduce." President of the union Georges Flamengt declared that "If these adjustments were not made, Brussels will inflict a 10000€ penalty a day to the French state." The cost of destruction for the eight mills had been quantified to a minimal estimate of 350,000 Euros financed by the French Water Agency (became a European Union Hydrographic District in 2000) which could reach 1.5 million Euros if the union opted for more expensive technical solutions. A consultation process had been initiated with all owners who were given until 2018 to comply with this regulatory requirement. Among those concerned about The Lamour mill were the 'Siccanor Mill' in Douchy-les-Mines, the 'Malaquin Mill' in Montrécourt, the 'Poirette Threshold' in Haussy, the 'Taupe Mill' in Saint-Python, the Barracks in Solesmes, the 'Bleuse Mill' in Neuvilly and the Third Estate Farm in Saint-Souplet.

== Museum ==
The museum is a three-story building displaying more than 300 rare objects and artifacts dating from 1800 to 1960. Pedagogical guided tours in costume are also available to classes of pupils and students, familiarizing them to characters from some of the 17th and 18th centuries' pivotal paintings. An estaminet with traditional wooden games is entirely recreated.

== Professional and amateur training ==
=== The handi'paint workshops ===
Marie-Anne and Ludovic Belleval lead specialized art workshops for therapeutic needs of people with disabilities and special needs. Every week, they welcome several groups from specialized institutions, such as shelters or occupational centers. People evolve at their own pace in a friendly and understanding atmosphere that is conducive to creativity. Participants are encouraged to respect, congratulate, and help each other by accepting differences without animosity. The teaching is individualized, and the proposed techniques are adapted according to intellectual, social, or physical difficulties. A workshop on the ground floor is fully accessible for wheelchair users.

=== Beekeeping – the belleval apiaries ===
Professionally trained beekeeper, Ludovic Belleval, produces flower honey, propolis, royal jelly, and pollen. In June and July, he welcomes school classes to witness the harvesting of the flowing frames of honey. Belleval is an educator beekeeper and aims at sensitizing school-children to the importance of environmental issues.
