= Clairfayts =

- Commune
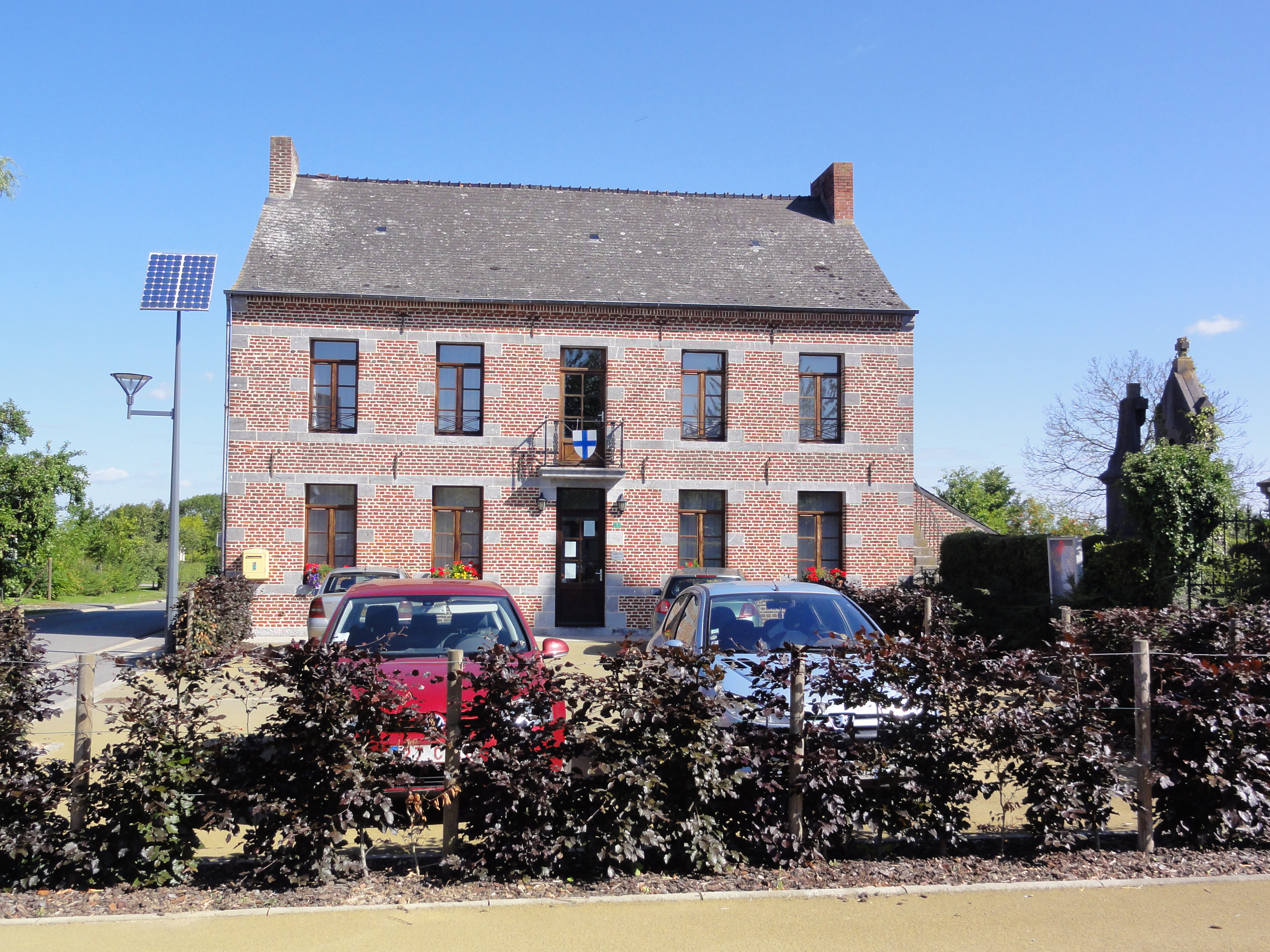
- The town hall in Clairfayts

- Coat of arms
- Location of Clairfayts
- Location within France Location within Hauts-de-France
- Coordinates: 50°09′27″N 4°07′23″E
- Country: France
- Region: Hauts-de-France
- Department: Nord
- Arrondissement: Avesnes-sur-Helpe
- Canton: Fourmies
- Intercommunality: Cœur de l'Avesnois

Government
  - Mayor (2024–2026): Joëlle Lefebvre
- Area^{1}: 7.53 km^{2} (2.91 sq mi)
- Highest elevation: 246 m (807 ft)
- Lowest elevation: 175 m (574 ft)
- Population (2023): 357
  - Density: 47.4/km^{2} (123/sq mi)
- Time zone: UTC+01:00 (CET)
  - Summer (DST): UTC+02:00 (CEST)
- INSEE/Postal code: 59148 /59740
- ^{1} French Land Register data, which excludes lakes, ponds, glaciers > 1 km^{2} (0.386 sq mi or 247 acres) and river estuaries.

Clairfayts (French pronunciation: [klɛʁfaj]) is a commune of the Nord department in northern France.

== Heraldry ==
Arms of Clairfayts	The arms of Clairfayts are blazoned : Argent, a cross azure. (Croix, Clairfayts and Marcq-en-Barœul use the same arms.)

== See also ==
- Communes of the Nord department
