= Villespy =

Commune in Occitanie, France

- Commune
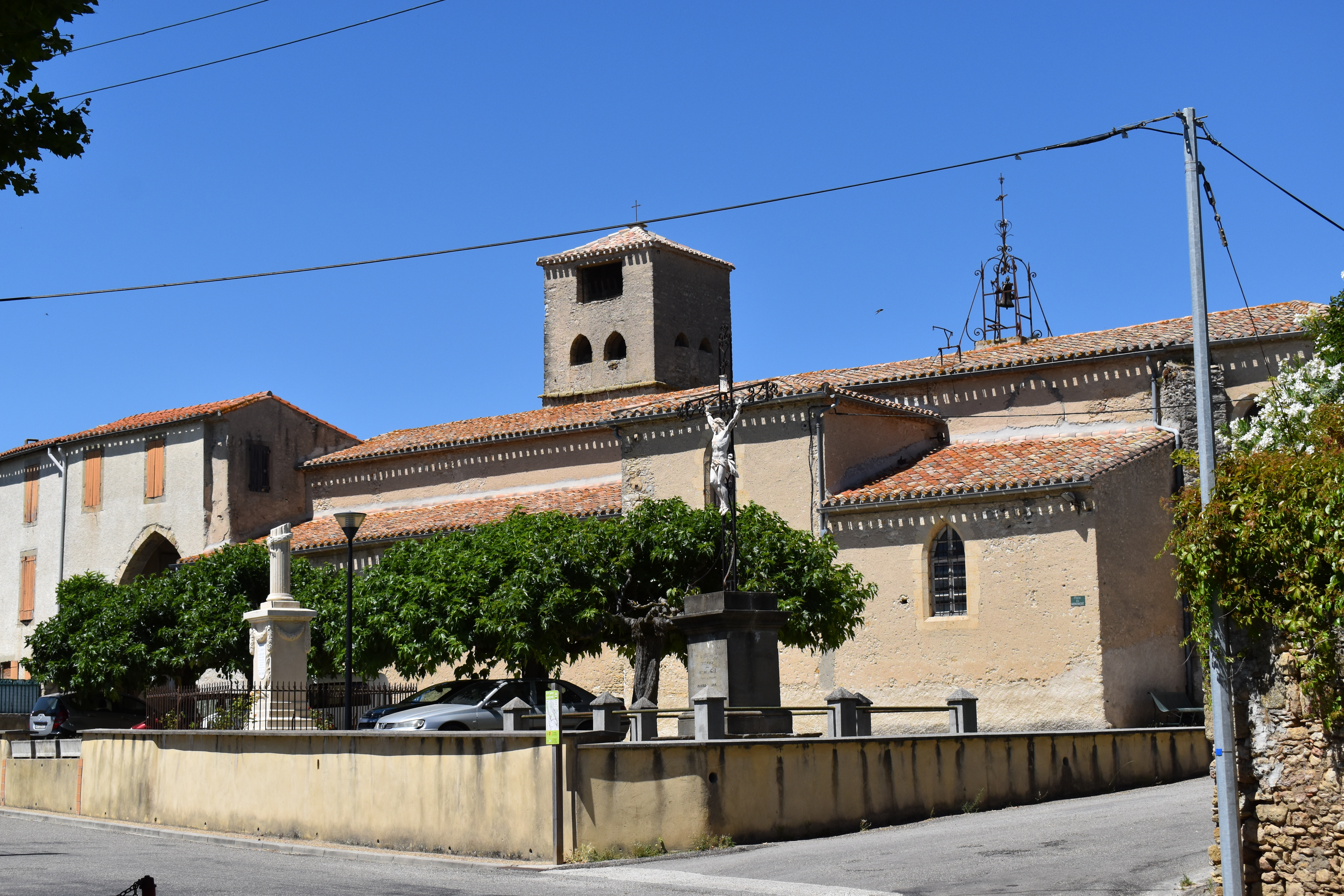
- A church in Villespy, France

- Coat of arms
- Location of Villespy
- Location within France Location within Occitanie
- Coordinates: 43°19′13″N 2°05′56″E
- Country: France
- Region: Occitania
- Department: Aude
- Arrondissement: Carcassonne
- Canton: La Malepère à la Montagne Noire
- Intercommunality: Piège - Lauragais - Malpère

Government
  - Mayor (2020–2026): Maryse Lala
- Area^{1}: 6.38 km^{2} (2.46 sq mi)
- Elevation: 161 m (528 ft)
- Highest elevation: 260 m (850 ft)
- Lowest elevation: 150 m (490 ft)
- Population (2023): 419
  - Density: 65.7/km^{2} (170/sq mi)
- Time zone: UTC+01:00 (CET)
  - Summer (DST): UTC+02:00 (CEST)
- INSEE/Postal code: 11439 /11170
- ^{1} French Land Register data, which excludes lakes, ponds, glaciers > 1 km^{2} (0.386 sq mi or 247 acres) and river estuaries.

Villespy is a French commune located in the northwest of the Aude department in the Occitania region of Southern France.

Historically and culturally, the commune is part of the Lauragais, the former "Land of Cockaigne," associated with both the cultivation of pastel (a dye plant) and the abundance of agricultural production, earning it the title of the "granary of Languedoc." Experiencing a Mediterranean climate, Villespy is drained by the streams of Tenten, Migaronne, Rec de Riplou, and another watercourse. The commune is notable for its natural heritage, including a natural area of ecological, faunal, and floristic interest.

Villespy is a rural commune with a population of 416 inhabitants in 2021, following a peak of 884 inhabitants in 1846. It is part of the attraction area of Castelnaudary. The residents are referred to as Villespynois.

== Population ==
Historical population
Year	Pop.	±% p.a.
1968	352	—
1975	296	−2.44%
1982	265	−1.57%
1990	271	+0.28%
1999	341	+2.59%
2007	370	+1.03%
2012	352	−0.99%
2017	373	+1.17%
2023	419	+1.96%
Source: INSEE

== See also ==
- Communes of the Aude department
