= Potelle =

- Commune
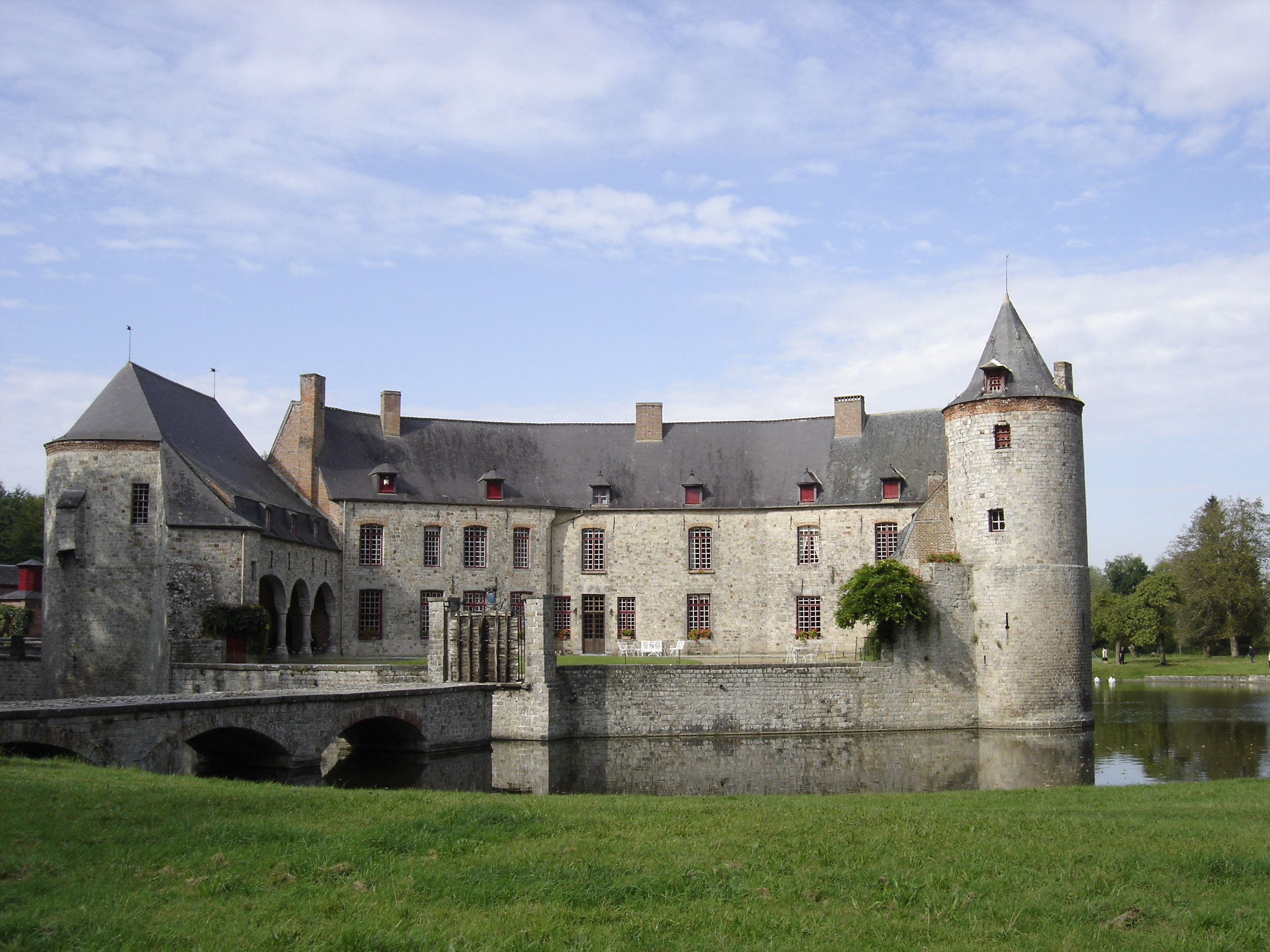
- The chateau in Potelle

- Coat of arms
- Location of Potelle
- Location within France Location within Hauts-de-France
- Coordinates: 50°14′06″N 3°39′51″E
- Country: France
- Region: Hauts-de-France
- Department: Nord
- Arrondissement: Avesnes-sur-Helpe
- Canton: Avesnes-sur-Helpe
- Intercommunality: Pays de Mormal

Government
  - Mayor (2023–2026): Vincent Dussart
- Area^{1}: 4.04 km^{2} (1.56 sq mi)
- Elevation: 104 m (341 ft)
- Highest elevation: 147 m (482 ft)
- Lowest elevation: 104 m (341 ft)
- Population (2023): 439
  - Density: 109/km^{2} (281/sq mi)
- Time zone: UTC+01:00 (CET)
  - Summer (DST): UTC+02:00 (CEST)
- INSEE/Postal code: 59468 /59530
- ^{1} French Land Register data, which excludes lakes, ponds, glaciers > 1 km^{2} (0.386 sq mi or 247 acres) and river estuaries.

Potelle (French pronunciation: [pɔtɛl]) is a commune in the Nord department in northern France.

It is 2 km (1.2 mi) east of Le Quesnoy and 15 km (9.3 mi) southeast of Valenciennes.

== Heraldry ==
Arms of Potelle	The arms of Potelle are blazoned : Azure, a bend Or between 6 bezants (Or). (Aulnoy-lez-Valenciennes, Bantouzelle, Briastre, Noyelles-sur-Selle and Potelle use the same arms.)

== See also ==
- Communes of the Nord department
