= Croix, Nord =

Croix
- Commune
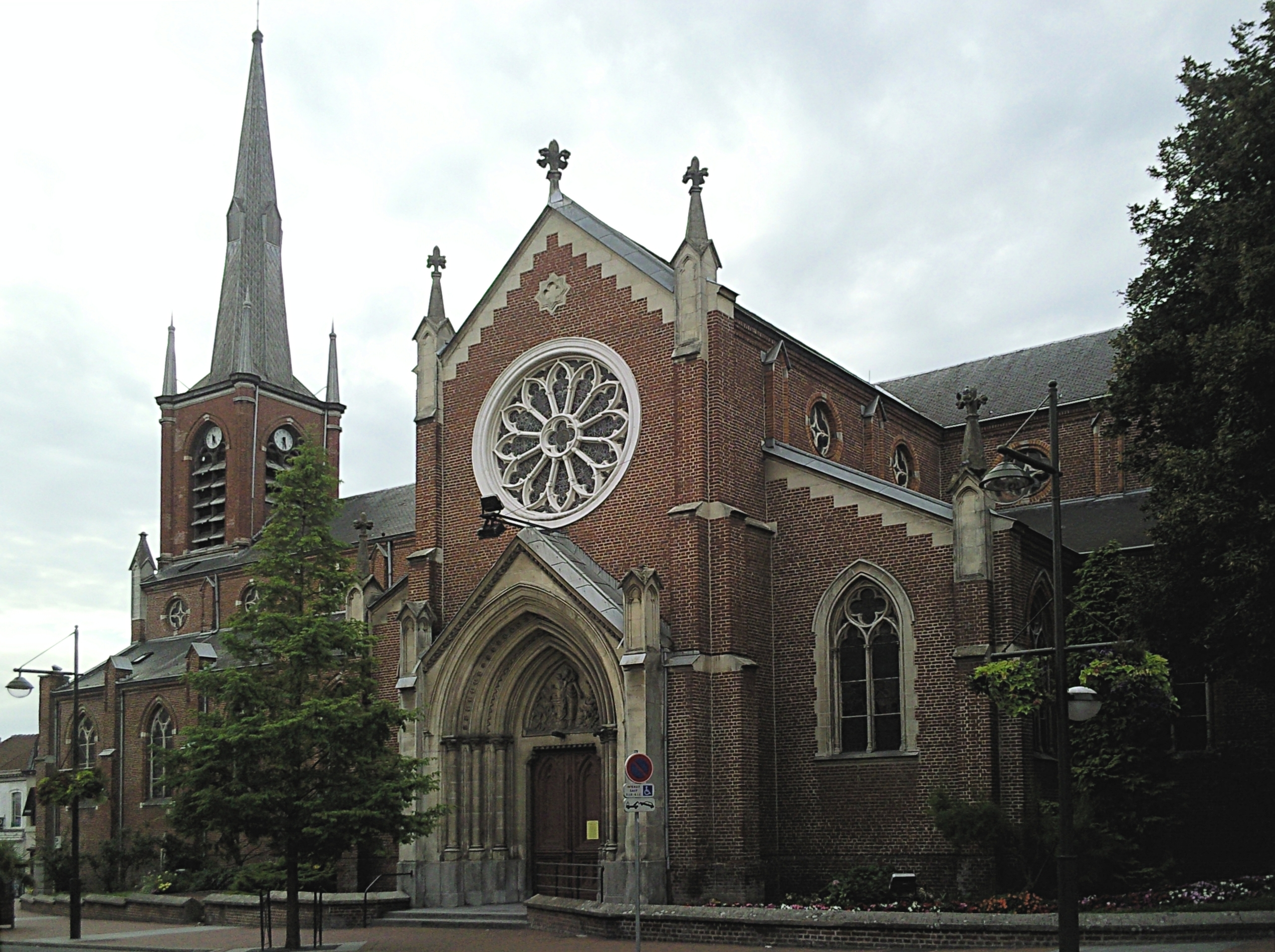
- Saint Martin Church

- Coat of arms
- Location of Croix
- Location within France Location within Hauts-de-France
- Coordinates: 50°40′41″N 3°09′03″E
- Country: France
- Region: Hauts-de-France
- Department: Nord
- Arrondissement: Lille
- Canton: Croix
- Intercommunality: Métropole Européenne de Lille

Government
  - Mayor (2020–2026): Régis Cauche
- Area^{1}: 4.44 km^{2} (1.71 sq mi)
- Highest elevation: 48 m (157 ft)
- Lowest elevation: 20 m (66 ft)
- Population (2023): 20,566
  - Density: 4,630/km^{2} (12,000/sq mi)
- Time zone: UTC+01:00 (CET)
  - Summer (DST): UTC+02:00 (CEST)
- INSEE/Postal code: 59163 /59170
- ^{1} French Land Register data, which excludes lakes, ponds, glaciers > 1 km^{2} (0.386 sq mi or 247 acres) and river estuaries.

Croix (French pronunciation: [kʁwa]; Picard: Crox) is a commune in the Nord department in northern France. It is located northeast of the city of Lille about 7 km (4.3 mi) from the centre.

The headquarters of Auchan, a hypermarket chain, are located in Croix.

== Population ==
Historical population

Year	Pop.	±% p.a.
1793	1,168	—
1800	1,194	+0.32%
1806	1,117	−1.10%
1821	1,158	+0.24%
1831	1,284	+1.04%
1836	1,456	+2.55%
1841	1,574	+1.57%
1846	1,890	+3.73%
1851	1,776	−1.24%
1856	2,099	+3.40%
1861	2,593	+4.32%
1866	2,888	+2.18%
1872	4,204	+6.46%
1876	5,741	+8.10%
1881	8,081	+7.08%
1886	9,528	+3.35%
1891	12,438	+5.48%
1896	14,338	+2.88%
1901	15,993	+2.21%

Year	Pop.	±% p.a.
1906	16,439	+0.55%
1911	17,596	+1.37%
1921	17,176	−0.24%
1926	19,278	+2.34%
1931	20,652	+1.39%
1936	20,280	−0.36%
1946	17,417	−1.51%
1954	18,702	+0.89%
1962	20,081	+0.89%
1968	21,424	+1.08%
1975	20,125	−0.89%
1982	19,386	−0.53%
1990	20,231	+0.53%
1999	20,638	+0.22%
2007	21,006	+0.22%
2012	20,664	−0.33%
2017	21,041	+0.36%
2023	20,566	−0.38%

Source: EHESS and INSEE (1968–2023)

== Heraldry ==
Arms of Croix	The arms of Croix are blazoned : Argent, a cross azure. (Croix, Clairfayts and Marcq-en-Barœul use the same arms.)

== See also ==
- Villa Cavrois
- Communes of the Nord department
