= Audencourt =

Coordinates: 50°07′08″N 3°26′24″E

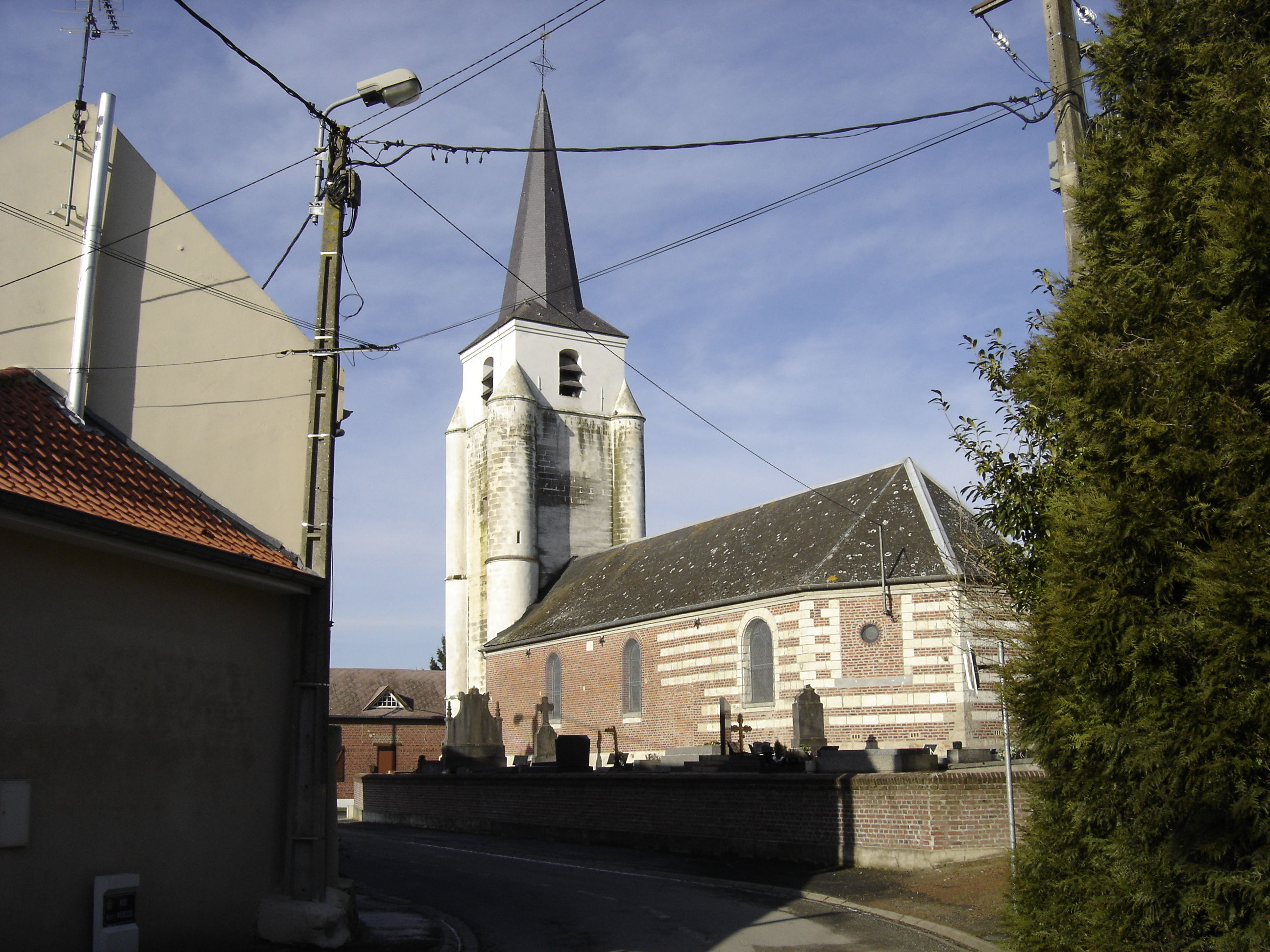
Audencourt - the Church

Audencourt is a former commune of the French department of Nord, merged in 1961 into the commune Caudry.

Audencourt is one of the 12 peerages of Cambrésis (a former province/region in France).

The arms are:

Argent, a lion gules, and in chief a label of 4 points azure.
