= Aulnoy-lez-Valenciennes =

- Commune
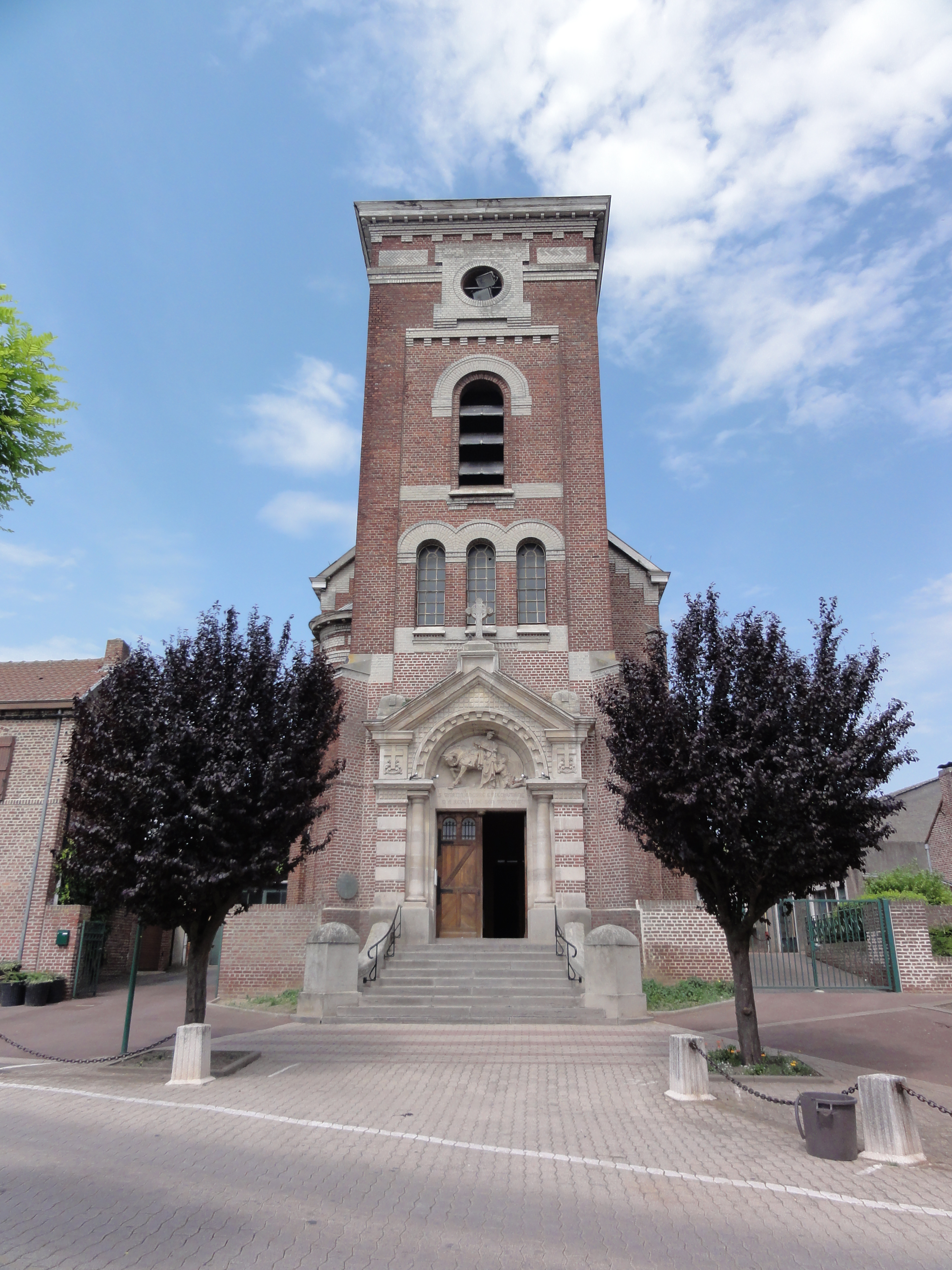
- The church in Aulnoy-lez-Valenciennes

- Coat of arms
- Location of Aulnoy-lez-Valenciennes
- Location within France Location within Hauts-de-France
- Coordinates: 50°19′55″N 3°31′51″E
- Country: France
- Region: Hauts-de-France
- Department: Nord
- Arrondissement: Valenciennes
- Canton: Aulnoy-lez-Valenciennes
- Intercommunality: CA Valenciennes Métropole

Government
  - Mayor (2020–2026): Laurent Depagne
- Area^{1}: 6.12 km^{2} (2.36 sq mi)
- Elevation: 37 m (121 ft)
- Highest elevation: 91 m (299 ft)
- Lowest elevation: 33 m (108 ft)
- Population (2023): 7,080
  - Density: 1,160/km^{2} (3,000/sq mi)
- Time zone: UTC+01:00 (CET)
  - Summer (DST): UTC+02:00 (CEST)
- INSEE/Postal code: 59032 /59300
- ^{1} French Land Register data, which excludes lakes, ponds, glaciers > 1 km^{2} (0.386 sq mi or 247 acres) and river estuaries.

Aulnoy-lez-Valenciennes (French pronunciation: [o(l)nwa le valɑ̃sjɛn], literally Aulnoy near Valenciennes; Picard: Auno) is a commune in the Nord department in northern France.

== Population ==
Historical population

Year	Pop.	±% p.a.
1806	442	—
1821	960	+5.31%
1831	1,143	+1.76%
1836	1,218	+1.28%
1841	1,301	+1.33%
1846	1,411	+1.64%
1851	1,500	+1.23%
1856	1,583	+1.08%
1861	1,740	+1.91%
1866	1,808	+0.77%
1872	1,826	+0.17%
1876	1,994	+2.22%
1881	2,007	+0.13%
1886	2,154	+1.42%
1891	2,243	+0.81%
1896	2,335	+0.81%
1901	2,491	+1.30%
1906	2,614	+0.97%

Year	Pop.	±% p.a.
1911	2,680	+0.50%
1921	2,339	−1.35%
1926	2,555	+1.78%
1931	2,592	+0.29%
1936	2,712	+0.91%
1946	2,748	+0.13%
1954	2,792	+0.20%
1962	3,565	+3.10%
1968	3,602	+0.17%
1975	7,465	+10.97%
1982	8,759	+2.31%
1990	8,029	−1.08%
1999	8,002	−0.04%
2007	7,346	−1.06%
2012	7,438	+0.25%
2017	7,341	−0.26%
2023	7,080	−0.60%

Source: EHESS and INSEE (1968-2023)

== Heraldry ==
Arms of Aulnoy-lez-Valenciennes	The arms of Aulnoy-lez-Valenciennes are blazoned : Azure, a bend Or between 6 bezants (Or). (Aulnoy-lez-Valenciennes, Bantouzelle, Briastre, Noyelles-sur-Selle and Potelle use the same arms.)

== See also ==
- Communes of the Nord department
