= Briastre =

- Commune
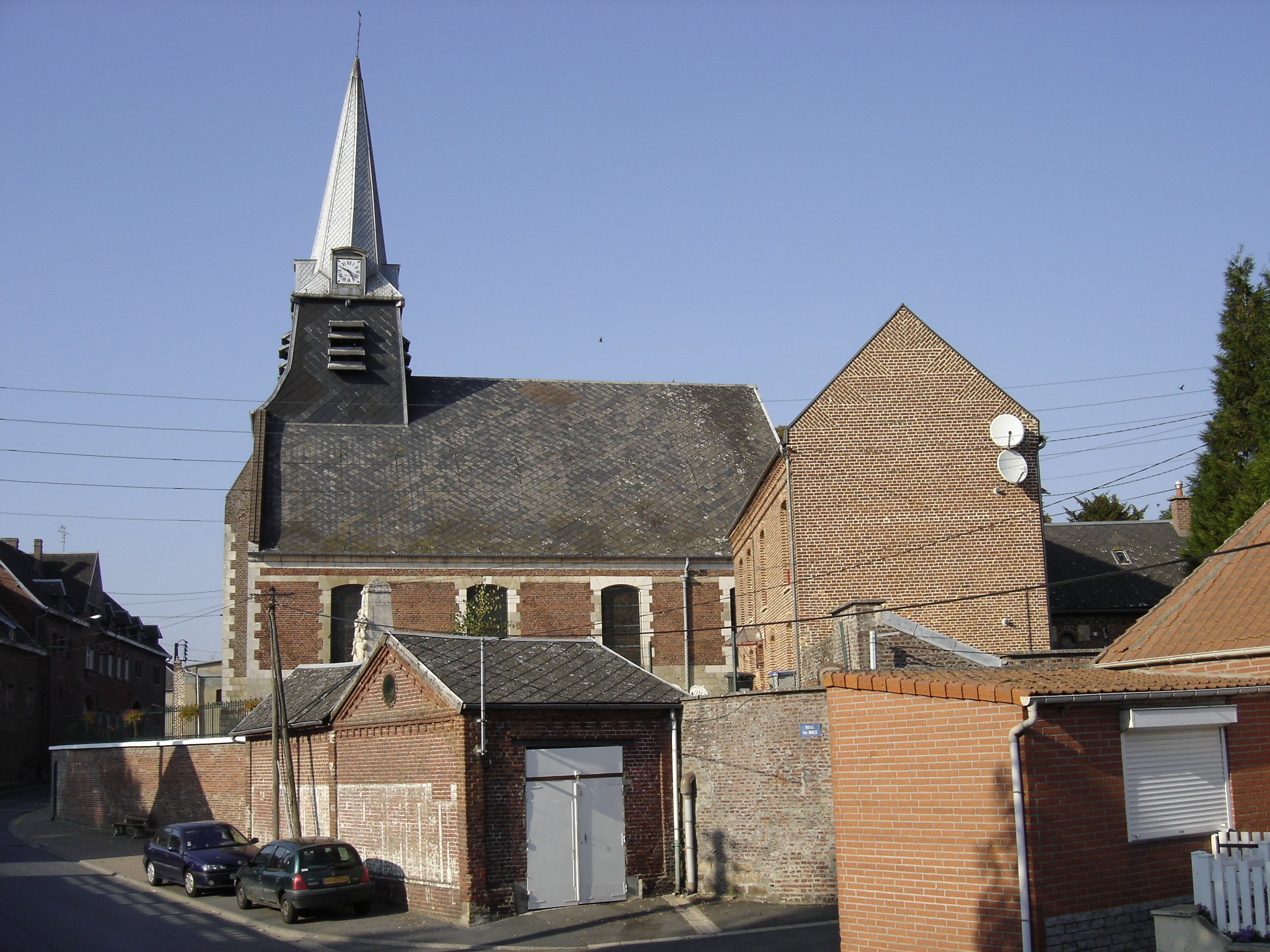
- The church in Briastre

- Coat of arms
- Location of Briastre
- Location within France Location within Hauts-de-France
- Coordinates: 50°09′38″N 3°29′15″E
- Country: France
- Region: Hauts-de-France
- Department: Nord
- Arrondissement: Cambrai
- Canton: Le Cateau-Cambrésis
- Intercommunality: CA Caudrésis–Catésis

Government
  - Mayor (2023–2026): Bruno Leclercq
- Area^{1}: 6.92 km^{2} (2.67 sq mi)
- Highest elevation: 126 m (413 ft)
- Lowest elevation: 67 m (220 ft)
- Population (2023): 689
  - Density: 99.6/km^{2} (258/sq mi)
- Time zone: UTC+01:00 (CET)
  - Summer (DST): UTC+02:00 (CEST)
- INSEE/Postal code: 59108 /59730
- ^{1} French Land Register data, which excludes lakes, ponds, glaciers > 1 km^{2} (0.386 sq mi or 247 acres) and river estuaries.

Briastre (French pronunciation: [bʁijastʁ]) is a commune in the Nord department in northern France.

== Population ==
Historical population
Year	Pop.	±% p.a.
1968	890	—
1975	851	−0.64%
1982	714	−2.48%
1990	650	−1.17%
1999	619	−0.54%
2007	632	+0.26%
2012	756	+3.65%
2017	748	−0.21%
2023	689	−1.36%
Source: INSEE

== Heraldry ==
Arms of Briastre	The arms of Briastre are blazoned : Azure, a bend Or between 6 bezants (Or). (Aulnoy-lez-Valenciennes, Bantouzelle, Briastre, Noyelles-sur-Selle and Potelle use the same arms.)

== Economics ==
In Briastre is a chemistry-factory. In the near of Briastre are agriculture farms.

== The Lamour Watermill ==
The Lamour Watermill, Briastre (French: Le Moulin Lamour) is a museum and art center located in the commune. The water-powered mill and its edifices were built in 1800. Preponderantly operating the mechanical processes of milling (grinding), rolling, or hammering up until the 1930s, the watermill was converted into a museum by the Bellevals in the late 1990s.

== See also ==
- Communes of the Nord department
