= Abancourt, Nord =

Abancourt
- Commune
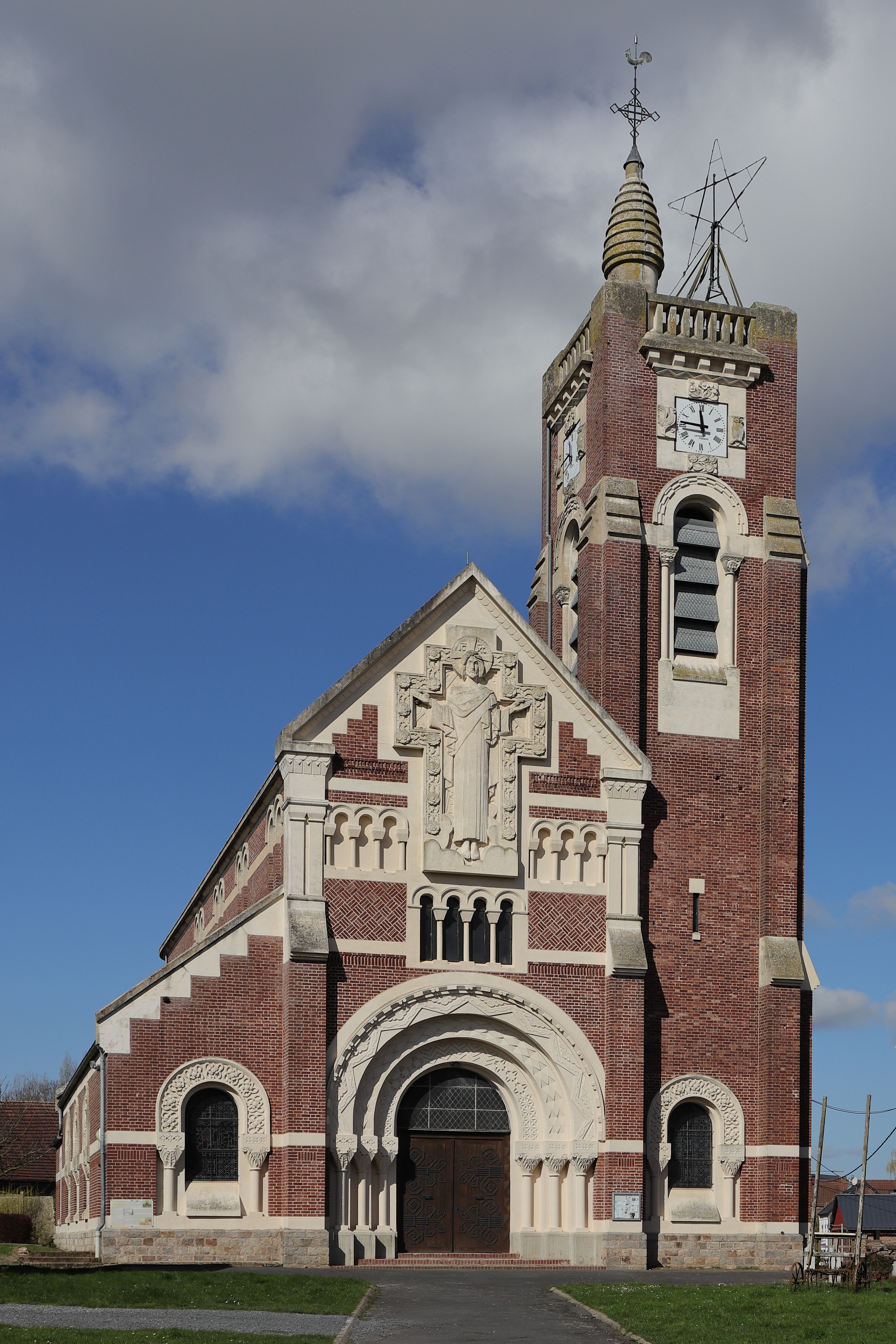
- The church in Abancourt

- Coat of arms
- Location of Abancourt
- Location within France Location within Hauts-de-France
- Coordinates: 50°14′05″N 3°12′51″E
- Country: France
- Region: Hauts-de-France
- Department: Nord
- Arrondissement: Cambrai
- Canton: Cambrai
- Intercommunality: CA Cambrai

Government
  - Mayor (2020–2026): Françoise Laine
- Area^{1}: 5.67 km^{2} (2.19 sq mi)
- Elevation: 57 m (187 ft)
- Highest elevation: 70 m (230 ft)
- Lowest elevation: 36 m (118 ft)
- Population (2023): 441
  - Density: 77.8/km^{2} (201/sq mi)
- Demonym(s): Abancourtois, Abancourtoises
- Time zone: UTC+01:00 (CET)
  - Summer (DST): UTC+02:00 (CEST)
- INSEE/Postal code: 59001 /59268
- ^{1} French Land Register data, which excludes lakes, ponds, glaciers > 1 km^{2} (0.386 sq mi or 247 acres) and river estuaries.

Abancourt (French pronunciation: [abɑ̃kuʁ]) is a commune in the Nord department in northern France.

== Population ==
Historical population

Year	Pop.	±% p.a.
1793	511	—
1821	580	+0.45%
1846	673	+0.60%
1872	602	−0.43%
1901	568	−0.20%
1926	431	−1.10%
1946	392	−0.47%
1962	365	−0.45%
1968	344	−0.98%

Year	Pop.	±% p.a.
1975	316	−1.21%
1982	351	+1.51%
1990	413	+2.05%
1999	433	+0.53%
2007	453	+0.57%
2012	445	−0.36%
2017	463	+0.80%
2023	441	−0.81%

Source: EHESS and INSEE

== Heraldry ==
Arms of Abancourt	The arms of Abancourt are blazoned : Azure, a mullet, and in chief a label of 3 points Or. (Abancourt and Fontaine-au-Pire use the same arms.)

== See also ==
- Communes of the Nord department
