= Berthen =

- Commune
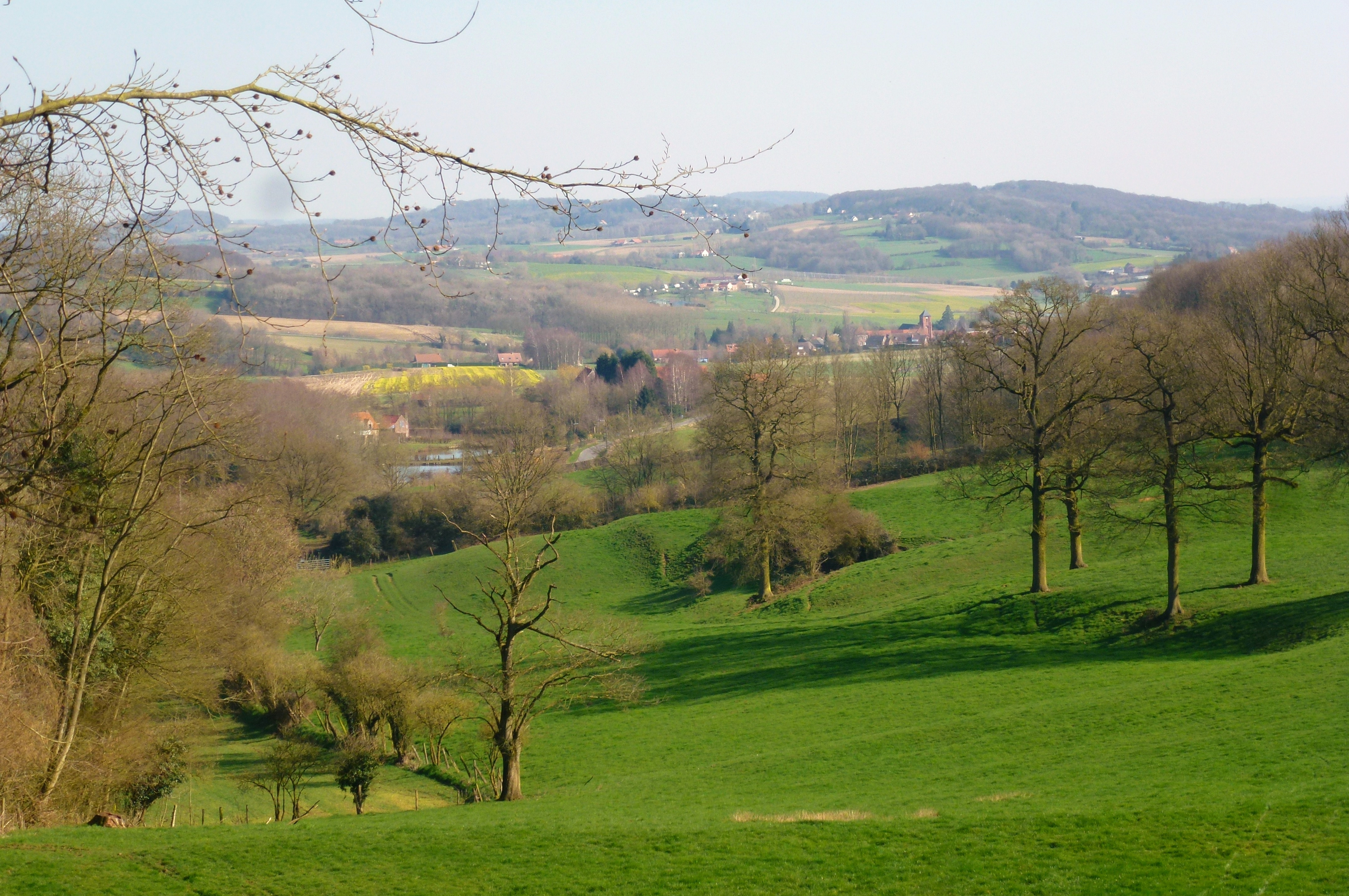
- A general view of Berthen

- Coat of arms
- Location of Berthen
- Location within France Location within Hauts-de-France
- Coordinates: 50°47′00″N 2°41′45″E
- Country: France
- Region: Hauts-de-France
- Department: Nord
- Arrondissement: Dunkerque
- Canton: Bailleul
- Intercommunality: CA Cœur de Flandre

Government
  - Mayor (2020–2026): Régis Dondeyne
- Area^{1}: 5.18 km^{2} (2.00 sq mi)
- Elevation: 58 m (190 ft)
- Highest elevation: 162 m (531 ft)
- Lowest elevation: 32 m (105 ft)
- Population (2023): 627
  - Density: 121/km^{2} (313/sq mi)
- Time zone: UTC+01:00 (CET)
  - Summer (DST): UTC+02:00 (CEST)
- INSEE/Postal code: 59073 /59270
- ^{1} French Land Register data, which excludes lakes, ponds, glaciers > 1 km^{2} (0.386 sq mi or 247 acres) and river estuaries.

Berthen (French pronunciation: [bɛʁtɛn]; in Dutch: Berten), located at the foot of Mont des Cats, is a commune in the Nord department in northern France.

It is 2 km (1.2 mi) from the Belgian border, and 5 km (3.1 mi) north of Bailleul.

== Population ==
Historical population
Year	Pop.	±% p.a.
1968	426	—
1975	406	−0.68%
1982	439	+1.12%
1990	464	+0.69%
1999	517	+1.21%
2007	501	−0.39%
2012	510	+0.36%
2017	551	+1.56%
2023	627	+2.18%
Source: INSEE

== Church of St Blaise ==
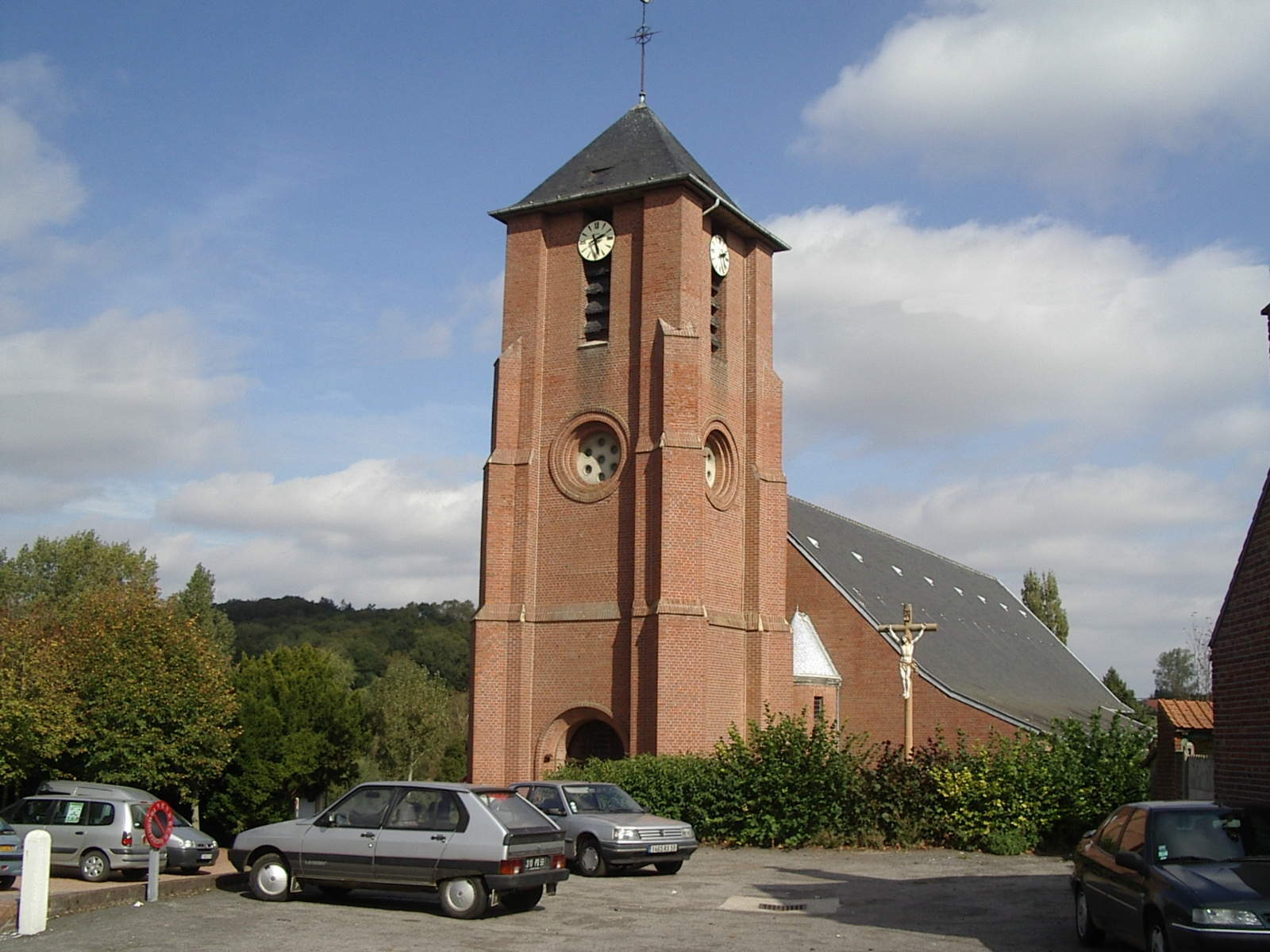
Berthen church

The ancient church dated from 1589. The church and village was destroyed on 28 May 1940 by German bombing.

The new church was begun in 1961 to the plans of the architect E.-M. Thibault and consecrated 12 July 1964. The new church retains the profile of the old. Claude Blanchet's windows show the Passion.

== Heraldry ==
Arms of Berthen	The arms of Berthen are blazoned : Or, a bordure azure, and on an inescutcheon argent, a lion gules armed, langued and crowned Or, within a bordure azure. (Caëstre and Berthen use the same arms.)

== See also ==
- Communes of the Nord department
