= Caëstre =

- Commune
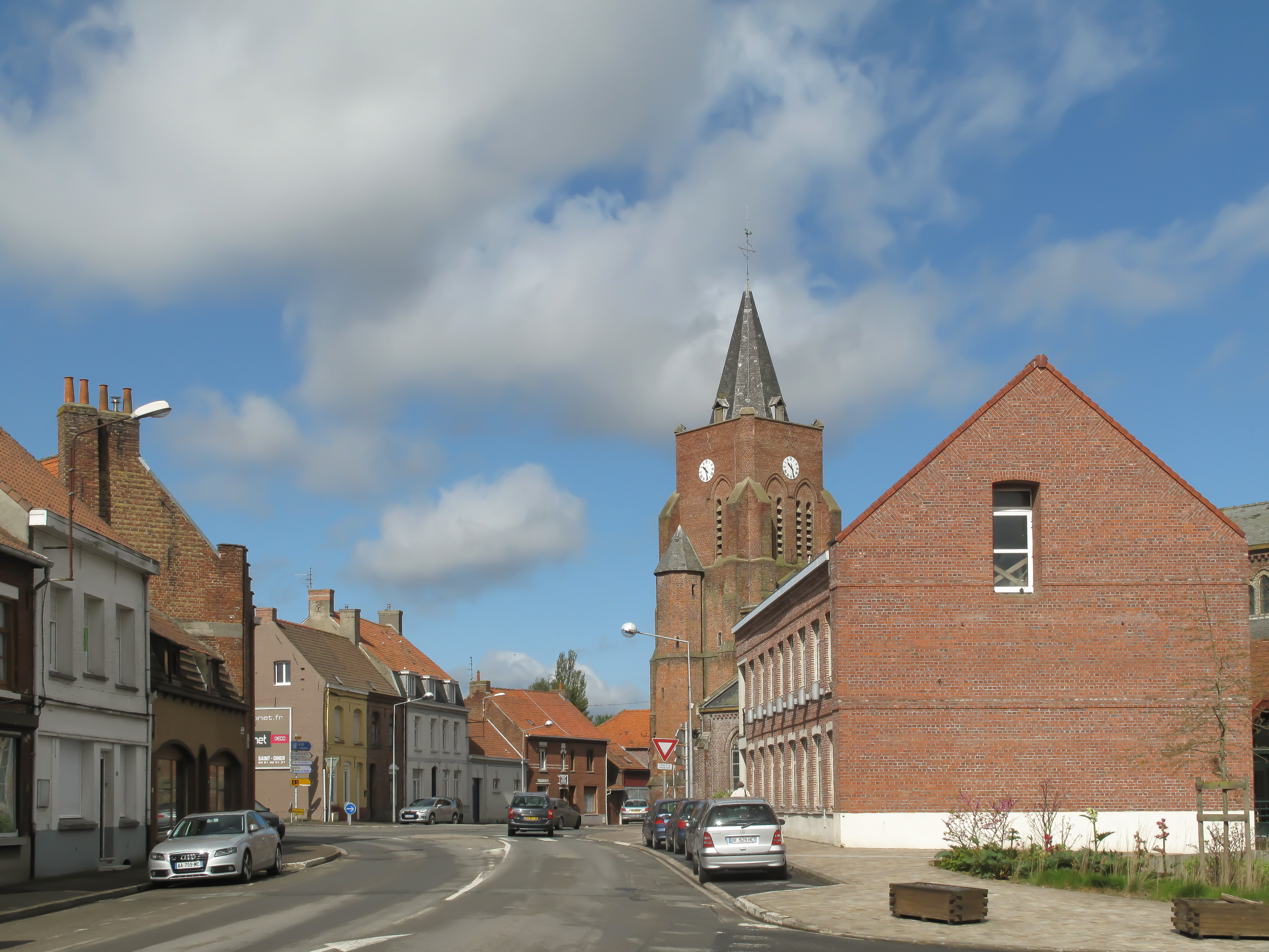
- Caëstre, church in the street
- Location of Caëstre
- Location within France Location within Hauts-de-France
- Coordinates: 50°45′32″N 2°36′18″E
- Country: France
- Region: Hauts-de-France
- Department: Nord
- Arrondissement: Dunkerque
- Canton: Bailleul
- Intercommunality: CA Cœur de Flandre

Government
  - Mayor (2020–2026): Jean-Luc Schricke
- Area^{1}: 10.2 km^{2} (3.9 sq mi)
- Elevation: 38 m (125 ft)
- Highest elevation: 62 m (203 ft)
- Lowest elevation: 24 m (79 ft)
- Population (2023): 1,951
  - Density: 191/km^{2} (495/sq mi)
- Demonym: Caestrois (es)
- Time zone: UTC+01:00 (CET)
  - Summer (DST): UTC+02:00 (CEST)
- INSEE/Postal code: 59120 /59190
- ^{1} French Land Register data, which excludes lakes, ponds, glaciers > 1 km^{2} (0.386 sq mi or 247 acres) and river estuaries.

Caëstre (French pronunciation: [kastʁ]; French Flemish: Kaester and Dutch: Kaaster) is a commune in the Nord department in northern France.

== Population ==
Historical population
Year	Pop.	±% p.a.
1968	1,164	—
1975	1,191	+0.33%
1982	1,340	+1.70%
1990	1,597	+2.22%
1999	1,677	+0.54%
2007	1,669	−0.06%
2012	1,906	+2.69%
2017	1,980	+0.76%
2023	1,951	−0.25%
Source: INSEE

== Heraldry ==
Arms of Caëstre	The arms of Caëstre are blazoned : Or, a bordure azure, and on an inescutcheon argent, a lion gules armed, langued and crowned Or, within a bordure azure. (Caëstre and Berthen use the same arms.)

== See also ==
- Communes of the Nord department
