= Camphin-en-Carembault =

- Commune
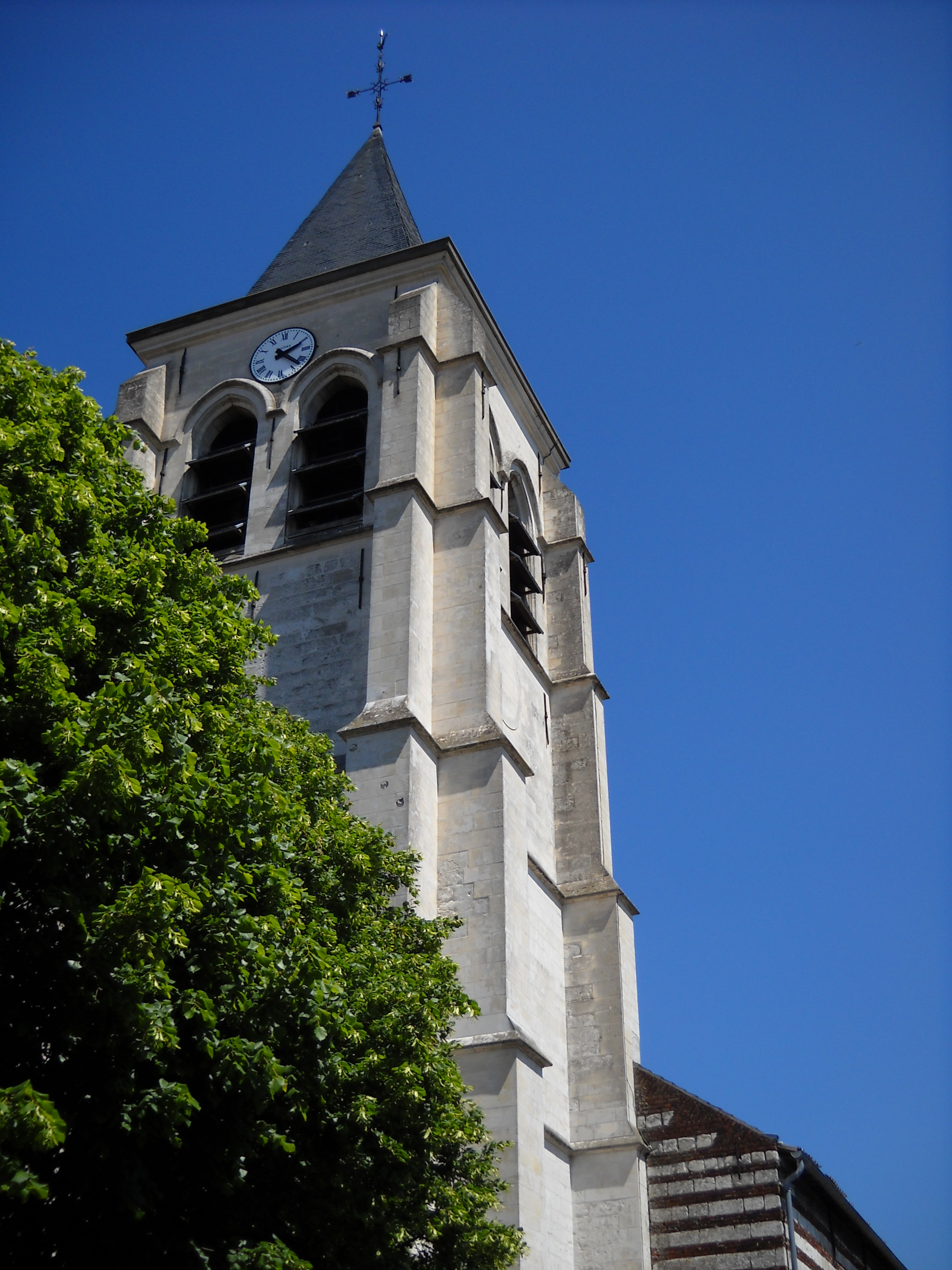
- The church in Camphin-en-Carembault

- Coat of arms
- Location of Camphin-en-Carembault
- Location within France Location within Hauts-de-France
- Coordinates: 50°30′46″N 2°59′16″E
- Country: France
- Region: Hauts-de-France
- Department: Nord
- Arrondissement: Lille
- Canton: Annœullin
- Intercommunality: Pévèle-Carembault

Government
  - Mayor (2022–2026): Matthieu Lestoquoy
- Area^{1}: 7.39 km^{2} (2.85 sq mi)
- Elevation: 33 m (108 ft)
- Highest elevation: 36 m (118 ft)
- Lowest elevation: 26 m (85 ft)
- Population (2023): 1,737
  - Density: 235/km^{2} (609/sq mi)
- Time zone: UTC+01:00 (CET)
  - Summer (DST): UTC+02:00 (CEST)
- INSEE/Postal code: 59123 /59133
- ^{1} French Land Register data, which excludes lakes, ponds, glaciers > 1 km^{2} (0.386 sq mi or 247 acres) and river estuaries.

Camphin-en-Carembault (French pronunciation: [kɑ̃fɛ̃ ɑ̃ kaʁɑ̃bo]) is a commune in the Nord department in northern France.

== Heraldry ==
Arms of Camphin-en-Carembault	The arms of Camphin-en-Carembault are blazoned : Gules, 3 keys argent. (Boëseghem and Camphin-en-Carembault use the same arms.)

== See also ==
- Communes of the Nord department
