= Boëseghem =

- Commune
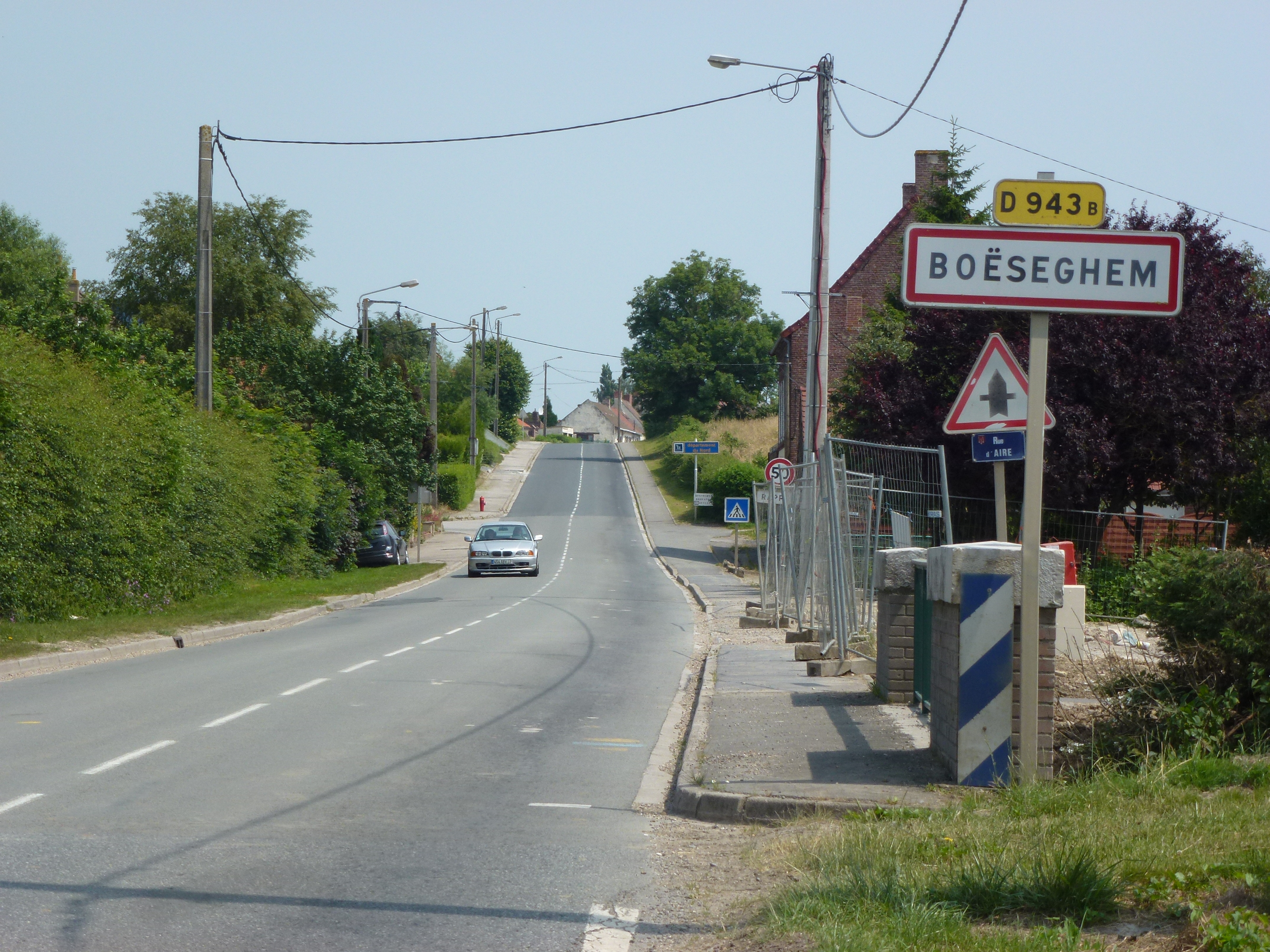
- The road into Boëseghem

- Coat of arms
- Location of Boëseghem
- Location within France Location within Hauts-de-France
- Coordinates: 50°39′45″N 2°26′18″E
- Country: France
- Region: Hauts-de-France
- Department: Nord
- Arrondissement: Dunkerque
- Canton: Hazebrouck
- Intercommunality: CA Cœur de Flandre

Government
  - Mayor (2020–2026): Danielle Mametz
- Area^{1}: 7.08 km^{2} (2.73 sq mi)
- Elevation: 36 m (118 ft)
- Highest elevation: 68 m (223 ft)
- Lowest elevation: 17 m (56 ft)
- Population (2023): 766
  - Density: 108/km^{2} (280/sq mi)
- Time zone: UTC+01:00 (CET)
  - Summer (DST): UTC+02:00 (CEST)
- INSEE/Postal code: 59087 /59189
- ^{1} French Land Register data, which excludes lakes, ponds, glaciers > 1 km^{2} (0.386 sq mi or 247 acres) and river estuaries.

Boëseghem (French pronunciation: [bozɡɛm]; Dutch: Boezegem) is a commune in the Nord department in northern France.

== Population ==
Historical population
Year	Pop.	±% p.a.
1968	666	—
1975	684	+0.38%
1982	721	+0.76%
1990	751	+0.51%
1999	755	+0.06%
2007	767	+0.20%
2012	712	−1.48%
2017	748	+0.99%
2023	766	+0.40%
Source: INSEE

== Heraldry ==
Arms of Boëseghem	The arms of Boëseghem are blazoned : Gules, 3 keys argent. (Boëseghem and Camphin-en-Carembault use the same arms.)

== See also ==
- Communes of the Nord department
