= Noyelles-sur-Selle =

- Commune
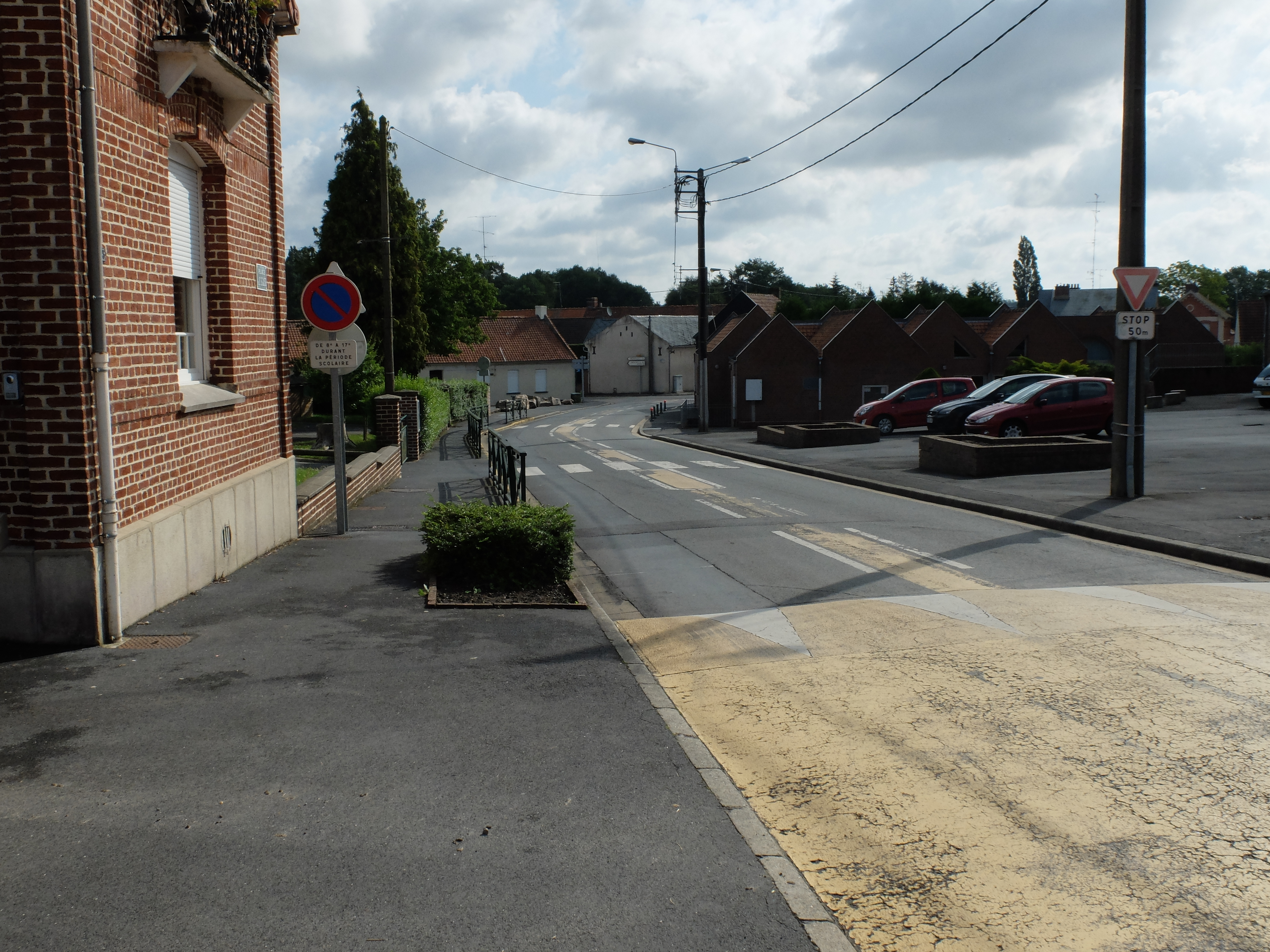
- A view within Noyelles-sur-Selle

- Coat of arms
- Location of Noyelles-sur-Selle
- Location within France Location within Hauts-de-France
- Coordinates: 50°17′10″N 3°23′15″E
- Country: France
- Region: Hauts-de-France
- Department: Nord
- Arrondissement: Valenciennes
- Canton: Denain
- Intercommunality: CA Porte du Hainaut

Government
  - Mayor (2020–2026): Daniel Sauvage
- Area^{1}: 5.05 km^{2} (1.95 sq mi)
- Elevation: 52 m (171 ft)
- Highest elevation: 73 m (240 ft)
- Lowest elevation: 33 m (108 ft)
- Population (2023): 657
  - Density: 130/km^{2} (337/sq mi)
- Time zone: UTC+01:00 (CET)
  - Summer (DST): UTC+02:00 (CEST)
- INSEE/Postal code: 59440 /59282
- ^{1} French Land Register data, which excludes lakes, ponds, glaciers > 1 km^{2} (0.386 sq mi or 247 acres) and river estuaries.

Noyelles-sur-Selle (French pronunciation: [nwajɛl syʁ sɛl], literally Noyelles on Selle) is a commune in the Nord department in northern France.

== Heraldry ==
Arms of Noyelles-sur-Selle	The arms of Noyelles-sur-Selle are blazoned : Azure, a bend Or between 6 bezants (Or). (Aulnoy-lez-Valenciennes, Bantouzelle, Briastre, Noyelles-sur-Selle and Potelle use the same arms.)

== Notable people from Noyelles ==
- Francisco Luis Héctor de Carondelet, colonial governor for the Spanish Empire

== See also ==
- Communes of the Nord department
