= Bantouzelle =

- Commune
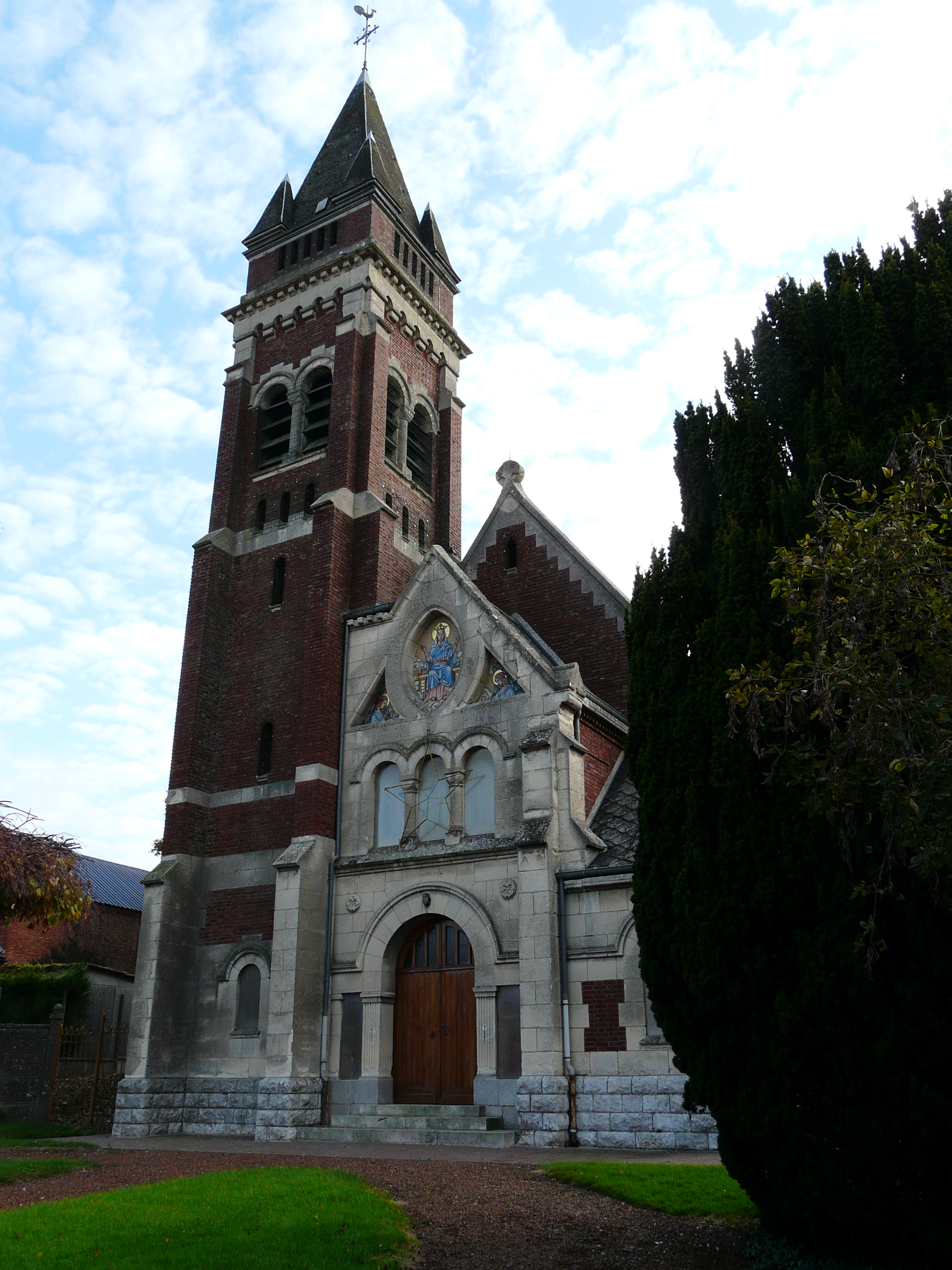
- The church in Bantouzelle

- Coat of arms
- Location of Bantouzelle
- Location within France Location within Hauts-de-France
- Coordinates: 50°03′41″N 3°12′25″E
- Country: France
- Region: Hauts-de-France
- Department: Nord
- Arrondissement: Cambrai
- Canton: Le Cateau-Cambrésis
- Intercommunality: CA Cambrai

Government
  - Mayor (2020–2026): Sylviane Maur
- Area^{1}: 7.45 km^{2} (2.88 sq mi)
- Elevation: 75 m (246 ft)
- Highest elevation: 143 m (469 ft)
- Lowest elevation: 69 m (226 ft)
- Population (2023): 441
  - Density: 59.2/km^{2} (153/sq mi)
- Time zone: UTC+01:00 (CET)
  - Summer (DST): UTC+02:00 (CEST)
- INSEE/Postal code: 59049 /59266
- ^{1} French Land Register data, which excludes lakes, ponds, glaciers > 1 km^{2} (0.386 sq mi or 247 acres) and river estuaries.

Bantouzelle (French pronunciation: [bɑ̃tuzɛl]) is a commune in the Nord department in northern France.

== Population ==
Historical population
| Year | Pop. | ±% p.a. |
|---|---|---|
| 1968 | 415 | — |
| 1975 | 386 | −1.03% |
| 1982 | 375 | −0.41% |
| 1990 | 356 | −0.65% |
| 1999 | 386 | +0.90% |
| 2007 | 403 | +0.54% |
| 2012 | 412 | +0.44% |
| 2017 | 426 | +0.67% |
| 2023 | 441 | +0.58% |
Source: INSEE

== Heraldry ==
| Arms of Bantouzelle | The arms of Bantouzelle are blazoned : Azure, a bend Or between 6 bezants (Or). (Aulnoy-lez-Valenciennes, Bantouzelle, Briastre, Noyelles-sur-Selle and Potelle use the same arms.) |

== See also ==
- Communes of the Nord department
