= Cazilhac, Aude =

Commune in Occitanie, France

Cazilhac
- Commune
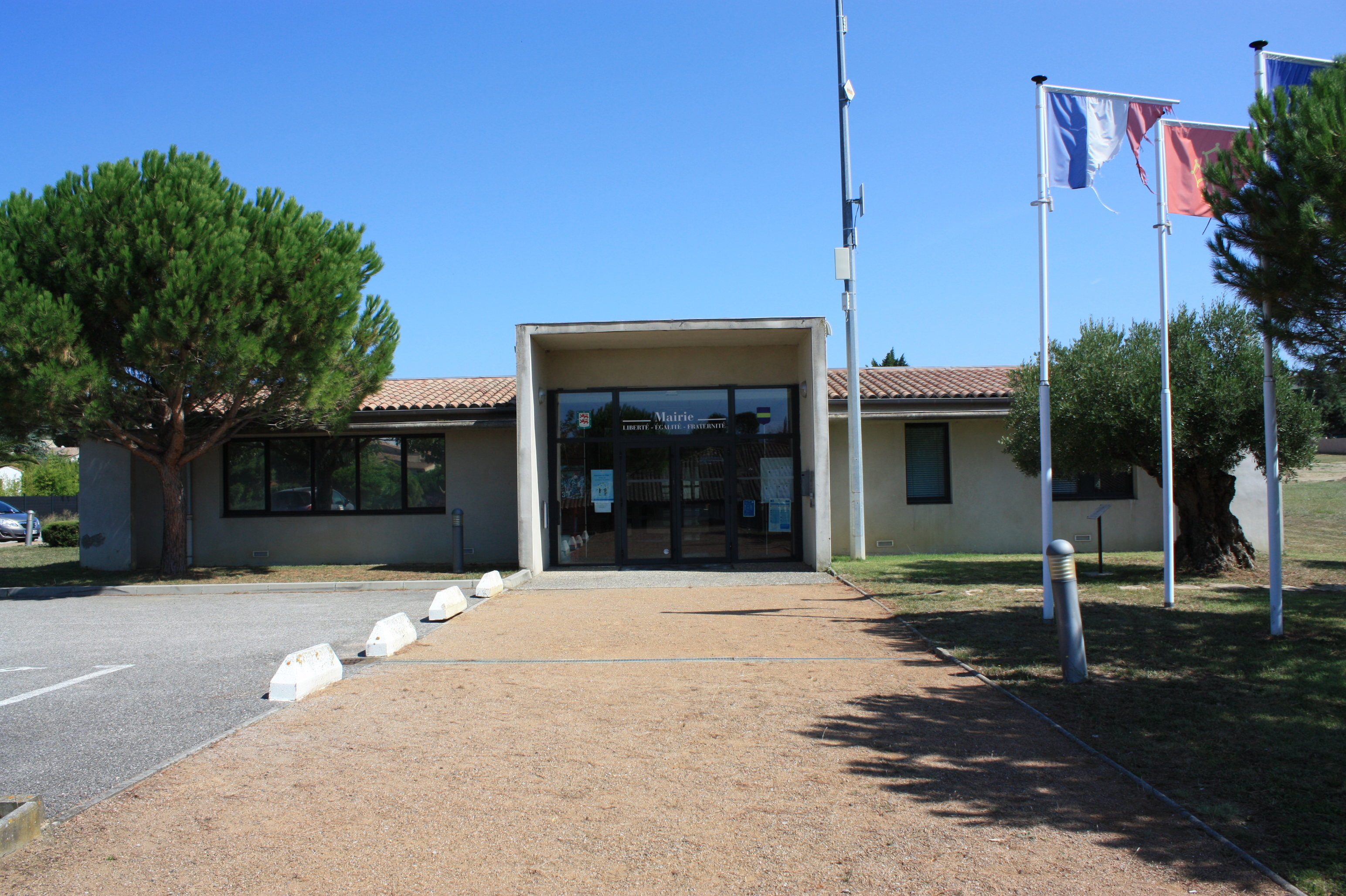
- The town hall in Cazilhac

- Coat of arms
- Location of Cazilhac
- Location within France Location within Occitanie
- Coordinates: 43°11′02″N 2°21′52″E
- Country: France
- Region: Occitania
- Department: Aude
- Arrondissement: Carcassonne
- Canton: Carcassonne-2
- Intercommunality: Carcassonne Agglo

Government
  - Mayor (2020–2026): Toni Carvajal
- Area^{1}: 3.83 km^{2} (1.48 sq mi)
- Elevation: 140 m (460 ft)
- Highest elevation: 222 m (728 ft)
- Lowest elevation: 126 m (413 ft)
- Population (2023): 1,664
  - Density: 434/km^{2} (1,130/sq mi)
- Time zone: UTC+01:00 (CET)
  - Summer (DST): UTC+02:00 (CEST)
- INSEE/Postal code: 11088 /11570
- ^{1} French Land Register data, which excludes lakes, ponds, glaciers > 1 km^{2} (0.386 sq mi or 247 acres) and river estuaries.

Cazilhac (French pronunciation: [kazijak]; Occitan: Casilhac) is a commune in the Aude department in southern France.

== Population ==
Historical population
Year	Pop.	±% p.a.
1968	257	—
1975	1,178	+24.30%
1982	1,357	+2.04%
1990	1,384	+0.25%
1999	1,449	+0.51%
2007	1,583	+1.11%
2012	1,658	+0.93%
2017	1,648	−0.12%
2023	1,664	+0.16%
Source: INSEE

== See also ==
- Communes of the Aude department
