= Armorial of the Communes of Nord (I–P) =

This page lists the armoury emblazons, heraldic descriptions, or coats of arms of the communes in Nord (cities beginning I-P).

== Complete lists of Nord armorial pages ==
- Armorial of the Communes of Nord (A–C)
- Armorial of the Communes of Nord (D–H)
- Armorial of the Communes of Nord (I–P)
- Armorial of the Communes of Nord (Q–Z)

== I ==
Image	Name of Commune	French blazon	English blazon
	Illies	D'azur à sept besants d'or, 3, 3, et 1, au chef du même.	Azure, 7 bezants (3,3,1) and a chief Or. (Clary and Illies use the same arms.)
	Inchy	De gueules à trois lionceaux d'argent couronnés d'or.	Gules, 3 lions argent crowned Or. (Avesnes-les-Aubert, Éclaibes and Inchy use the same arms.)
	Iwuy	D'argent à la croix engrêlée de sable, au lambel à cinq pendants de gueules.	Argent a cross engrailed sable overall in chief a label of five points gules.

== J ==
Image	Name of Commune	French blazon	English blazon
	Jenlain	D'argent, au chevron de sable accompagné de trois trèfles de sinople On le retrouve aussi sous l'ancien blason: D'argent au chevron de sable, accompagné de trois trèfles du même.	Argent a chevron sable between three trefoils vert.
	Jeumont	D'argent à trois lionceaux de gueules et une bande engrêlée de sinople brochant sur le tout.	Argent three lions gules overall a bend engrailed vert.
	Jolimetz	D'azur à la bande d'argent.	Azure, a bend argent. (Bouvignies, Jolimetz and Ochtezeele use the same arms.)

== K ==
Image	Name of Commune	French blazon	English blazon
	Killem	D'argent au lion de sable, lampassé de gueules.	Argent a lion sable langued gules.

== L ==
Image	Name of Commune	French blazon	English blazon
	Lallaing	De gueules à dix losanges d'argent accolés et aboutés, trois, trois, trois et un. Ce blason est bien visible sur l'aquarelle de l'album de Croÿ consacrée à Lallaing. De plus, l'armorial Lalaing lui-même (1560-1570) donne ce blasonnement.	Gules, 10 lozenges conjoined argent 3,3,3 and 1. (Fressain, Hergnies, Lallaing and Marpent use the same arms.)
	Lambersart	D'hermines à trois bandes de gueules, chargée de douze coquilles d'or, 3, 6, et 3 dans le sens des bandes.	Ermine three bends gules semy of escallops bendwise or.
	Lambres-lez-Douai	D'argent à deux pots à deux anses de sable, l'un au second quartier, l'autre en pointe, au franc quartier de gueules semé de billettes d'argent et chargé sur le tout d'un lion du même.	Argent three two-handled pots sable overall a canton gules billetty a lion argent.
	Landas	Parti émanché d'argent et de gueules de dix pièces.	Per pale highly indented argent and gules. (Cagnoncles, Landas, Raucourt-au-Bois and Thun-Saint-Amand use the same arms.)
	Landrecies	D'azur à un château ouvert et donjonné de trois tours d'or, sur une terrasse du même. Sur la terrasse, une champagne chargée d'une Croix de Guerre 1914-1918, d'une Légion d'honneur et d'une Croix de Guerre 1939-1945, chacune sur les couleurs de son ruban. Ancien blason: D'azur à un château ouvert et donjonné de trois tours d'or, sur une terrasse du même.	Azure a triple towered castle open or on a base three medals of the tinctures of their respective ribbons 1: Croix de Guerre 1914-1918; 2: a Légion d'honneur; and 3: a Croix de Guerre 1939-1945;
	Lannoy	D'argent à trois têtes de chien clabaud de sable.	Argent three hounds sable.
	Larouillies	Bandé d'or et de gueules.	Bendy Or and gules. (Avesnes-sur-Helpe, Cartignies, Damousies, Dimechaux, Dimont, Felleries, Larouillies, Lomme, and Ramousies use the same arms.)
	Lauwin-Planque	Bandé de gueules et de vair.	Bendy gules and vair.
	Lecelles	D'azur semé de fleurs de lys d'or.	Azure, semy de lys Or. = France Ancient (Ansacq, Brillon, Escaudain, Escautpont, Hélesmes, Hérin, Lecelles, Lieu-Saint-Amand, Lourches, Neuville-sur-Escaut, Rosult, Rumegies and Wignehies use the same arms.)
	Lécluse	D'azur à trois éperons d'or, la molette en haut.	Azure three spurs or, rowel upwards.
	Lederzeele	D'azur semé de billettes d'or, à la bande du même chargée de trois merlettes de gueules.	Azure billetty on a bend or three martlets gules.
	Ledringhem	De gueules au chevron d'hermine, accompagné de trois molettes à six rais d'argent.	Gules a chevron ermine between three pierced mullets of six argent.
	Leers	De sable à quatre clefs d'argent mises en pal, 2 et 2, les pannetons en haut et à dextre.	Sable, 4 keys argent. (Leers and Saint-Pierre-Brouck use the same arms.)
	Leffrinckoucke	Échiqueté d'argent et d'azur à la roue dentée de seize pièces de sable remplie de gueules, soutenue de deux épis de blé d'or passés en sautoir, au chef du même soutenu d'une trangle ondée d'azur, chargé d'un lion léopardé de sable armé et lampassé de gueules. Croix de Guerre avec étoile d'argent – 1940 Le premier blason de la commune était : Échiqueté d'argent et d'azur. Le deuxième blason fut : Taillé d'azur à une usine d'argent et d'or au lion léopardé de sable, à la barre de gueules brochant sur le taillé.	Chequy argent and azure a toothed wheel sable pierced gules above and between two stalks of wheat in saltire or, on a chief wavy of the same fimbriated azure, a lion passant sable armed and langued gules.
	Lesdain	D'or à trois chevrons de gueules.	Or, 3 chevrons gules. (Ivry-la-Bataille, Lesdain, Saint-Aubert and Tilloy-lez-Cambrai use the same arms.)
	Lesquin	D'or à la croix engrêlée de gueules.	Or, a cross engrailed gules. (Artres, Bettrechies, Cerfontaine, Eth, Lesquin, Obies, Quérénaing, Semousies, Wambrechies and Warlaing use the same arms.)
	Leval	Échiqueté d'argent et d'azur, à l'écusson de gueules brochant en abîme.	Chequy argent and azure, an inescutcheon gules.
	Lewarde	Coupé d'or au lion de gueules tenant de ses pattes de devant une banderole du même et d'azur à trois merlettes d'argent.	Per fess or and azure a lion maintaining a banderole gules and three martlets argent.
	Lezennes	D'or à trois fleurs de lys d'azur, au franc-canton bandé d'argent et de gueules	Or three fleurs de lys azure, a canton bendy argent and gules.
	Lez-Fontaine	Écartelé: aux 1 et 4, d'argent à trois fasces de gueules; aux 2 et 3, d'argent à trois doloires de gueules, les deux du chef adossées.	Quarterly 1&4: Argent, 3 fesses gules; 2&3: Argent, 3 wagoner's axes top 2 addorsed gules. (Bermerain, Étrœungt, Féron, Ferrière-la-Grande, Lez-Fontaine, Rousies, Solre-le-Château and Solrinnes use the same arms.)
	Liessies	D'argent à une hure de sanglier de sable, défendue du champ et lampassée de gueules.	Argent, a boar's head erased sable, armed argent langued gules. (Liessies, Sains-du-Nord and Sémeries use the same arms.)
	Lieu-Saint-Amand	D'azur semé de fleurs de lys d'or.	Azure, semy de lys Or. = France Ancient (Ansacq, Brillon, Escaudain, Escautpont, Hélesmes, Hérin, Lecelles, Lieu-Saint-Amand, Lourches, Neuville-sur-Escaut, Rosult, Rumegies and Wignehies use the same arms.)
	Ligny-en-Cambrésis	D'azur à un écusson d'argent, accompagné de onze billettes du même mises en orle.	Azure, an inescutcheon between in orle 11 billets argent. (Ligny-en-Cambrésis, Masnières and Villers-au-Tertre use the same arms.)
	Ligny-en-Weppes; En 1927 Ligny fusionne avec Beaucamps et devient Beaucamps-Ligny.	D'azur à un écusson d'argent en abîme, au sautoir de gueules brochant sur le tout.	Azure an inescutcheon argent overall a saltire gules.
	Lille	De gueules à la fleur de lys d'argent Napoléon a donné à la ville de Lille des armes impériales: coupé d'azur et de gueules, l'azur au drapeau en lance d'argent orlé d'or; la gueule à la ville fortifiée et bombardée, le tout d'argent au chef cousu des bonnes villes. Elles resteront inchangées jusqu'à la fin du XIXe siècle où les abeilles (symbole impérial) seront remplacées par des étoiles. Un tel écu est d'ailleurs visible au niveau du dôme de la Poste située place de la République. Le maire de Lille, Gustave Delory, rétablira finalement le blason actuel.	Gules, a fleur de lys argent.
	Limont-Fontaine	D'or à trois chevrons de sable. mais le mairie semble préférer «d'argent, à trois fasces de gueules»	Or, 3 chevrons sable. (Bersillies, Boeschepe, Boussières-sur-Sambre, Colleret, Cousolre, Flaumont-Waudrechies, Hautmont, Limont-Fontaine, Lompret, Masny, Neuville-en-Avesnois and Saint-Rémy-du-Nord use the same arms.) but the city hall uses Argent three fesses gules
	Linselles	D'argent à une fasce de sable.	Argent, a fess sable. (Linselles and Rieux-en-Cambrésis use the same arms.)
	Locquignol	D'azur à trois macles d'argent.	Azure three mascles argent.
	Loffre	D'azur semé de fleurs de lys d'or, au cerf d'argent passant sur le tout.	Azure semy de lys Or, a stag argent. (Capelle, Loffre, Neuville-Saint-Rémy, Pecquencourt, and Vred use the same arms.)
	Lomme; Commune associated with Lille since 2000.	Bandé d'or et de gueules.	Bendy Or and gules. (Avesnes-sur-Helpe, Cartignies, Damousies, Dimechaux, Dimont, Felleries, Larouillies, Lomme, and Ramousies use the same arms.)
	Lompret	D'or à trois chevrons de sable.	Or, 3 chevrons sable. (Bersillies, Boeschepe, Boussières-sur-Sambre, Colleret, Cousolre, Flaumont-Waudrechies, Hautmont, Limont-Fontaine, Lompret, Masny, Neuville-en-Avesnois and Saint-Rémy-du-Nord use the same arms.)
	La Longueville	D'azur semé de billettes d'argent, au lion du même, armé et lampassé de gueules, brochant sur le tout.	Azure, billetty, a lion argent, armed and langued gules. (La Longueville, Templemars, and Verchain-Maugré use the same arms.)
	Looberghe	D'argent à la croix de sable chargée de cinq quintefeuilles d'or.	Argent on a cross sable five cinqfoils or.
	Loon-Plage	D'argent semé de billettes de sable, et un lion du même, armé et lampassé de gueules, brochant sur le tout. Depuis quelques années, la mairie utilise cette variante: D'or semé de billettes de sable, et un lion du même, armé et lampassé de gueules, brochant sur le tout.	Argent billetty, a lion sable armed and langued gules. (Loon-Plage and Spycker use the same arms.)
	Loos	De gueules à trois croissants d'or	Gules three crescents or.
	Lourches	D'azur semé de fleurs de lys d'or.	Azure, semy de lys Or. = France Ancient (Ansacq, Brillon, Escaudain, Escautpont, Hélesmes, Hérin, Lecelles, Lieu-Saint-Amand, Lourches, Neuville-sur-Escaut, Rosult, Rumegies and Wignehies use the same arms.)
	Louvignies-Bavay; Former commune merged into Bavay 15 November 1946.	De gueules semé de billettes d'argent, au lion du même, lampassé de gueules, brochant sur le tout.	Gules semy of billets a lion argent langued gules.
	Louvignies-Quesnoy	De vair à trois pals de gueules.	Vair, 3 pales gules. (Englefontaine, Louvignies-Quesnoy, Poix-du-Nord and Saint-Waast-la-Vallée use the same arms.)
	Louvil	De gueules à une escarboucle d'or percée de sinople.	Gules an escarbuncle or pierced vert.
	Louvroil	traditionnellement:D'or à l'aigle à deux têtes de sable, becquée et membrée d'or, languée de gueules. mais la Mairie semble préférer: D'azur à l'aigle à deux têtes d'or.	Or, a double headed eagle sable, beaked and membered Or, langued gules. (Louvroil and Mecquignies use the same arms.) (traditional); Azure a double-headed eagle or. (In current use.)
	Lynde	D'argent à trois maillets de sable.	Argent three mallets sable.
	Lys-lez-Lannoy	De vair au chef de gueules.	Vair a chief gules.

== M ==
Image	Name of Commune	French blazon	English blazon
	La Madeleine	De sable à l'aigle d'argent, becquée et membrée d'or.	Sable, an eagle argent, beaked and membered Or. (La Madeleine and Pont-à-Marcq use the same arms.)
	Maing	D'argent au lion de sable, couronné d'or, armé et lampassé de gueules.	Argent a lion sable crowned or armed and langued gules.
	Mairieux	D'azur à la croix recroisettée et péronnée de trois marches d'or.	Azure a cross crosslet of calvary or.
	Le Maisnil	D'azur à l'écusson d'argent en abîme, accompagné de sept merlettes du même mises en orle.	Azure an inescutcheon within 7 martlets in orle argent.
	Malincourt	D'argent au lion de gueules, et un lambel à cinq pendants d'azur en chef.	Argent a lion gules and in chief a label of five points azure.
	Malo-les-Bains; Former commune merged with Dunkerque in 1970.	De gueules à l'étoile d'argent s'élevant d'une mer de même, qui est Malo-les-Bains; accompagnée de deux Roses d'or de Rosendaël; au chef coussu d'or chargé d'un lion de sable armé et lampassé de gueules, qui est de Flandre. Croix de Guerre – 1940.	Gules a mullet of five argent between two roses or and a base wavy argent, on a chief or a lion sable armed and langued gules.
	Marbaix	D'argent à un rencontre de cerf de gueules brochant sur une crosse d'or en pal.	Argent, a stag's massacre gules surmounting a crozier palewise Or. (Marbaix, Maroilles, Noyelles-sur-Sambre, and Salesches use the same arms.)
	Marchiennes	D'or à une escarboucle de sable, chargée en cœur d'un rubis de gueules.	Or, on an escarbuncle sable a ruby gules. (Abscon, Beuvry-la-Forêt, Erre, Fenain, Marchiennes, Ronchin, Tilloy-lez-Marchiennes and Wandignies-Hamage use the same arms.)
	Marcoing	De sable fretté d'argent.	Sable fretty argent.
	Marcq-en-Barœul	D'argent à la croix d'azur.	Argent, a cross azure. (Croix, Clairfayts and Marcq-en-Barœul use the same arms.)
	Marcq-en-Ostrevent	D'argent à trois aigle éployées de sable.	Argent three eagles sable.
	Mardyck; Former commune, associated since 1980 with Dunkerque.	D'azur à une barque d'or, portant un Saint Nicolas de carnation, vêtu d'argent et d'or, crossé et mitré du même, et bénissant de la dextre. En 1989, la commune modifie le blason: D'azur à une barque d'or, portant un Saint Nicolas de carnation, vêtu d'argent et d'or, crossé et mitré du même, et bénissant de la dextre, trois enfants à ses pieds le regardant.	Azure standing in a boat or St. Nicolas vested argent and of the second with mitre and crozier of the same and three children at his feet.
	Maresches	D'or à trois lionceaux d'azur, au chef de gueules chargé d'une Notre-Dame-de-Grâce à mi-corps, de carnation, vêtue de gueules et d'azur et tenant l'enfant Jésus à senestre.	Or, 3 lions azure, on a chief gules, a demi-'Notre-Dame-de-Grâce de carnation' issuant from the line of division, vested gules and azure and holding in her left arm the Baby Jesus. (Boursies, Cattenières, Carnières, Estrun, Maresches, Onnaing, Ors, Orsinval, Thun-l'Évêque and originally, Notre-Dame de Cambrai, use the same arms.)
	Maretz	De gueules à une rose tigée et feuillée d'argent.	Gules, a rose slipped and leaved argent. (Bazuel, Maretz and Saint-Benin use the same arms.)
	Marly	D'or à la croix de sable.	Or a cross sable.
	Maroilles	D'argent à un rencontre de cerf de gueules brochant sur une crosse d'or en pal.	Argent, a stag's massacre gules surmounting a crozier palewise Or. (Marbaix, Maroilles, Noyelles-sur-Sambre, and Salesches use the same arms.)
	Marpent	De gueules à dix losanges d'argent accolés et aboutés, trois, trois, trois et un.	Gules, 10 lozenges conjoined argent 3,3,3 and 1. (Fressain, Hergnies, Lallaing and Marpent use the same arms.)
	Marquette-en-Ostrevant	D'azur semé de billettes d'argent, au croissant du même brochant sur le tout.	Azure billetty a crescent argent.
	Marquette-lez-Lille	D'azur au nom de Marquette d'argent mis en bande entre deux cotices du même.	Azure the name "Marquette" bendwise between two bendlets argent.
	Marquillies	D'argent à la fasce d'azur.	Argent a fess azure.
	Masnières	D'azur à l'écusson d'argent, accompagné de onze billettes du même mises en orle.	Azure, an inescutcheon between in orle 11 billets argent. (Ligny-en-Cambrésis, Masnières and Villers-au-Tertre use the same arms.)
	Masny	D'or à trois chevrons de sable.	Or, 3 chevrons sable. (Bersillies, Boeschepe, Boussières-sur-Sambre, Colleret, Cousolre, Flaumont-Waudrechies, Hautmont, Limont-Fontaine, Lompret, Masny, Neuville-en-Avesnois and Saint-Rémy-du-Nord use the same arms.)
	Mastaing	De gueules à la fasce d'or accompagnée en chef d'une divise vivrée du même.	Gules, a fess and in chief a vivre Or. [a vivre is a thin barrulet dancetty] (Hornaing and Mastaing use the same arms.)
	Maubeuge	D'or aux quatre lions, les deux rangés en bande de sable armés et lampassés de gueules, les deux rangés en barre du même armés et lampassés d'azur, surmontés d'une aigle de sable becquée, lampassée, membrée et armée aussi de gueules, à la crosse en ombre d'or brochant en bande sur le tout	Or four lions two in bend sable armed and langued gules two in bend sinister of the same armed and langued azure in chief an eagle of the second beaked langued membered and armed of the third overall a crozier of the first bendwise.
	Maulde	D'or à la bande de gueules.	Or, a bend gules. (Hestrud and Maulde use the same arms.)
	Maurois	D'azur au lion d'argent et à la bordure d'or.	Azure, a lion argent within a bordure Or. (Maurois and Montigny-en-Cambrésis use the same arms.)
	Mazinghien	De sinople à une mésange au naturel perchée sur une branche; au chef parti: au 1, de pourpre à une croix d'or chargée en abîme d'un écusson d'or à trois bandes de sinople surmonté d'une couronne d'or, accompagnée en chef d'un chapeau d'archevêque de sinople à dix houppes de sable, de chaque côté, posées 1, 2, 3, et 4, et en pointe d'une bannière portant la devise: "A te principium, tibi desinet" au 2, d'or au lion de sable armé et lampassé de gueules.	Vert a titmouse proper perched on a branch, on a chief per pale 1: Purpure the arms of Salignac in complete archepiscopal achievement including a crown enfiling the cross above the shield and a motto on a banner "A te principium, tibi desinet", in base 2: Or a lion sable armed and langued gules.
	Mecquignies	D'or à l'aigle à deux têtes de sable, becquée et membrée d'or, languée de gueules.	Or, a double headed eagle sable, beaked and membered Or, langued gules. (Louvroil and Mecquignies use the same arms.)
	Merckeghem	D'or à deux crosses de gueules, affrontées et passées en sautoir, accompagnées en chef et en flancs de trois corbeaux de sable, et en pointe d'un mont de sinople.	Or two croziers in saltire respectant gules between three corbies sable and a mount vert.
	Mérignies	Plumeté d'or et de sable.	Plumetty Or and sable. (Mérignies and Vendeville use the same arms.)
	Merris	D'argent à trois cornets de sable, liés et virolés de gueules.	Argent, 3 horns sable tied gules. (Hardifort, Merris and Oudezeele use the same arms.)
	Merville	Coupé d'or sur azur, à trois fleurs de lys de l'un en l'autre.	Per fess Or and azure, 3 fleurs de lys counterchanged. (Anhiers and Merville use the same arms.)
	Méteren	De gueules à deux clefs d'argent affrontées et passées en sautoir, et sur le tout un écusson d'or à trois cors de sable, liés de gueules.	Gules two keys in saltire respectant argent overall on an inescutcheon or three horns sable tied gules.
	Millam	De gueules au chef d'argent chargé de trois merlettes du champ.	Gules on a chief argent three martlets of the first.
	Millonfosse	Pas de blason connu à ce jour.	No known arms. This entry is only for the sake of completeness.
	Les Moëres	D'argent à la gerbe de blé de sable liée d'argent, soutenue d'une couronne de blé ouverte de sable liée d'argent.	Argent a garb of wheat sable tied argent within a wreath of wheat sable tied argent.
	Mœuvres	De gueules à deux chevrons d'argent.	Gules two chevrons argent.
	Monceau-Saint-Waast	De gueules à la licorne assise d'argent.	Gules, a unicorn sejant argent. (Monceau-Saint-Waast and Odomez use the same arms.)
	Monchaux-sur-Écaillon	D'argent à cinq cotices de gueules, à la bordure de sable chargée de huit besants d'or.	Argent five bendlets gules and on a bordure sable eight bezants.
	Moncheaux	De sinople au nom de Monceaux d'or, mis en bande entre deux cotices du même, et accompagné en chef à senestre d'un écu gironné d'or et d'azur de douze pièces, chargé en cœur d'un écusson de gueules.	Vert the name "Monceaux" bendwise between two bendlets or and in chief sinister an inescutcheon gironny of twelve or and azure charged with another inescutcheon gules.
	Monchecourt	De gueules à trois chevrons d'argent.	Gules three chevrons argent.
	Mons-en-Barœul	D'or à la bande de sable.	Or, a bend sable. (Flesquières, Gonnelieu, Mons-en-Barœul and Viesly use the same arms.)
	Mons-en-Pévèle	D'or à la croix ancrée et alaisée de gueules.	Or, a cross moline gules. (Annœullin, Bauvin and Mons-en-Pévèle use the same arms.)
	Montay	Échiqueté d'argent et d'azur, au lambel à six pendants de gueules.	Chequy argent and azure a label of six points gules.
	Montigny-en-Cambrésis	D'azur au lion d'argent et à la bordure d'or.	Azure, a lion argent within a bordure Or. (Maurois and Montigny-en-Cambrésis use the same arms.)
	Montigny-en-Ostrevent	Ecartelé: aux 1 et 4, fascé de gueules et de vair; aux 2 et 3, de gueules à dix losanges aboutées et accolées d'argent, 3, 3, 3 et 1.	Quarterly 1 and 4: barry gules and vair; 2 and 3: Gules ten lozenges conjoined argent 3, 3, 3, and 1.
	Montrécourt	D'argent à la bande d'azur chargée de trois coquilles d'or.	Argent, on a bend azure, 3 escallops bendwise Or. (Awoingt and Montrécourt use the same arms.)
	Morbecque	D'azur à une fasce d'or.	Azure, a fess Or. (Beaurepaire-sur-Sambre, Borre, Morbecque, Prisches, Cazilhac and Aubière use the same arms.)
	Morenchies; Former commune merged 1971 with Cambrai.	Coupé: au 1, d'azur à une croix de calvaire d'or, entrelacée d'une couronne d'épines du même, au 2, de gueules à trois fleurs de lis d'or.	Per fess 1: Azure, a latin cross enfiled of a crown of thorns Or; 2: Gules, 3 fleurs de lys Or. (Boussières-en-Cambrésis, Morenchies and Quiévy use the same arms.)
	Mortagne-du-Nord	D'or à la croix de gueules.	Or, a cross gules. (Bruille-Saint-Amand, Flines-lès-Mortagne, Mortagne-du-Nord and Nivelle use the same arms.)
	La Motte-aux-Bois; Former commune absorbed by Morbecque some time between 1790 and 1794.	De gueules à un château d'or, et une bordure cousue d'azur, chargée de cinq églises d'or, deux en chef, une à chaque flanc et une en pointe.	Gules a castle or within a bordure azure charged with five churches or.
	Mouchin	De gueules à la croix ancrée et alaisée d'or, cantonnée de quatre couronnes de laurier du même.	Gules a cross moline or between four laurel crowns of the same.
	Moustier-en-Fagne	De gueules à deux clefs d'or adossées en sautoir, les pannetons en haut.	Gules, 2 keys in saltire addorsed Or. (Hon-Hergies, Moustier-en-Fagne and Taisnières-sur-Hon use the same arms.)
	Mouvaux	D'or fretté d'azur.	Or fretty azure.

== N ==
Image	Name of Commune	French blazon	English blazon
	Naves	De gueules à la bande d'argent.	Gules a bend argent.
	Neuf-Berquin	De gueules à un écusson d'or en abîme.	Gules an inescutcheon or.
	Neuf-Mesnil	De gueules à la bande de vair.	Gules, a bend vair. (Neuf-Mesnil and Wattignies-la-Victoire use the same arms.)
	La Neuville	De gueules au chef d'or.	Gules, a chief Or. (La Neuville, Fresnes-sur-Escaut, Ostricourt, Phalempin and Sainghin-en-Weppes use the same arms.)
	Neuville-en-Avesnois	D'or à trois chevrons de sable.	Or, 3 chevrons sable. (Bersillies, Boeschepe, Boussières-sur-Sambre, Colleret, Cousolre, Flaumont-Waudrechies, Hautmont, Limont-Fontaine, Lompret, Masny, Neuville-en-Avesnois and Saint-Rémy-du-Nord use the same arms.)
	Neuville-en-Ferrain	D'or à trois bandes de gueules.	Or three bendlets gules.
	Neuville-Saint-Rémy	D'azur semé de fleurs de lis d'or, à un cerf passant d'argent brochant sur le tout.	Azure semy de lys Or, a stag argent. (Capelle, Loffre, Neuville-Saint-Rémy, Pecquencourt, and Vred use the same arms.)
	Neuville-sur-Escaut	D'azur semé de fleurs de lys d'or.	Azure, semy de lys Or. = France Ancient (Ansacq, Brillon, Escaudain, Escautpont, Hélesmes, Hérin, Lecelles, Lieu-Saint-Amand, Lourches, Neuville-sur-Escaut, Rosult, Rumegies and Wignehies use the same arms.)
	Neuvilly	D'argent à la croix ancrée de sable.	Argent, a cross moline sable. (Challes-les-Eaux, Montalembert, Neuvilly and Pommereuil use the same arms.)
	Nieppe	Ecartelé: aux 1 et 4, de sable à six besants d'or, 3, 2 et 1; aux 2 et 3, d'argent au chevron de gueules accompagné de trois roses du même.	Quarterly 1 and 4: Sable six bezants or 3, 2, and 1; 2 and 3: Argent a chevron between three roses gules.
	Niergnies	De sinople au mouton d'argent. donne un autre blasonnage: De sable fretté d'argent.	Vert a sheep argent.
	Nieurlet	Vairé d'or et d'azur.	Vairy Or and azure. (Beaurain, Nieurlet and Vendegies-au-Bois use the same arms.)
	Nivelle	D'or à la croix de gueules.	Or, a cross gules. (Bruille-Saint-Amand, Flines-lès-Mortagne, Mortagne-du-Nord and Nivelle use the same arms.)
	Nomain	De gueules à trois bustes de carnation ayant chacun un bandeau d'azur sur les yeux.	Gules three busts proper each with a blindfold azure.
	Noordpeene	D'argent à cinq fusées de gueules accolées en bande.	Argent five fusils conjoined in bend gules.
	Noyelles-lès-Seclin	D'argent au chevron de gueules, accompagné en chef de deux merlettes de sable et en pointe d'un trèfle de sinople.	Argent a chevron gules between two martlets sable and a trefoil vert.
	Noyelles-sur-Escaut	Burelé d'argent et d'azur de douze pièces.	Barry argent and azure. (Boussois, Noyelles-sur-Escaut and Villers-Campeau use the same arms.)
	Noyelles-sur-Sambre	D'argent à un rencontre de cerf de gueules brochant sur une crosse d'or en pal.	Argent, a stag's massacre gules surmounting a crozier palewise Or. (Marbaix, Maroilles, Noyelles-sur-Sambre, and Salesches use the same arms.)
	Noyelles-sur-Selle	D'azur à la bande d'or, accompagnée de six besants d'or mis en orle.	Azure, a bend Or between 6 bezants (Or). (Aulnoy-lez-Valenciennes, Bantouzelle, Briastre, Noyelles-sur-Selle and Potelle use the same arms.)

== O ==
Image	Name of Commune	French blazon	English blazon
	Obies	D'or à la croix engrêlée de gueules.	Or, a cross engrailed gules. (Artres, Bettrechies, Cerfontaine, Eth, Lesquin, Obies, Quérénaing, Semousies, Wambrechies and Warlaing use the same arms.)
	Obrechies	D'azur à trois fleurs de lis d'or.	Azure, 3 fleurs de lys Or. (France and the communes of Estreux, Obrechies use the same arms.)
	Ochtezeele	D'azur à la bande d'argent.	Azure, a bend argent. (Bouvignies, Jolimetz and Ochtezeele use the same arms.)
	Odomez	De gueules à une licorne assise d'argent.	Gules, a unicorn sejant argent. (Monceau-Saint-Waast and Odomez use the same arms.)
	Ohain	D'or à quatre pals de gueules, à la bordure engrêlée d'azur.	Or, 4 pales gules within a bordure engrailed azure. (Eppe-Sauvage, Ohain and Wallers-en-Fagne use the same arms.)
	Oisy	Ecartelé: aux 1 et 4, d'argent à la fasce de sable; aux 2 et 3, d'or à la croix ancrée de sable.	Quarterly 1&4: Argent, a fess sable; 2&3: Or, a cross moline sable. (Bellaing, Oisy and Preux-au-Bois use the same arms.)
	Onnaing	D'or à trois lionceaux d'azur, au chef de gueules chargé d'une Notre-Dame de Grâce à mi-corps, tenant l'Enfant Jésus à senestre, et vêtue de gueules et d'azur.	Or, 3 lions azure, on a chief gules, a demi-'Notre-Dame-de-Grâce de carnation' issuant from the line of division, vested gules and azure and holding in her left arm the Baby Jesus. (Boursies, Cattenières, Carnières, Estrun, Maresches, Onnaing, Ors, Orsinval, Thun-l'Évêque and originally, Notre-Dame de Cambrai, use the same arms.)
	Oost-Cappel	Ecartelé: aux 1 et 4, contre-écartelé d'or et de sable; aux 2 et 3, bandé d'argent et d'azur, à la bordure de gueules; sur le tout, de gueules à trois bandes de vair et au chef d'or.	Quarterly 1 and 4: Quarterly or and sable; 2 and 3: Bendy argent and azure a bordure gules; overall an inescutcheon gules charged with three bends vair and a chief of the first.
	Orchies	D'argent au lion de sable armé et lampassé de gueules, regardant une croisette du même en chef, le tout entouré d'une chaîne de gueules mise en orle.	Argent a lion sable armed and langued gules in dexter chief a crosslet within an orle gules.
	Ors	D'or à trois lionceaux d'azur, au chef de gueules chargé d'une Notre-Dame-de-Grâce à mi-corps, de carnation, vêtue de gueules et d'azur et tenant l'enfant Jésus à senestre.	Or, 3 lions azure, on a chief gules, a demi-'Notre-Dame-de-Grâce de carnation' issuant from the line of division, vested gules and azure and holding in her left arm the Baby Jesus. (Boursies, Cattenières, Carnières, Estrun, Maresches, Onnaing, Ors, Orsinval, Thun-l'Évêque and originally, Notre-Dame de Cambrai, use the same arms.)
	Orsinval	D'or à trois lionceaux d'azur, au chef de gueules chargé d'une Notre-Dame-de-Grâce à mi-corps, de carnation, vêtue de gueules et d'azur et tenant l'enfant Jésus à senestre.	Or, 3 lions azure, on a chief gules, a demi-'Notre-Dame-de-Grâce de carnation' issuant from the line of division, vested gules and azure and holding in her left arm the Baby Jesus. (Boursies, Cattenières, Carnières, Estrun, Maresches, Onnaing, Ors, Orsinval, Thun-l'Évêque and originally, Notre-Dame de Cambrai, use the same arms.)
	Ostricourt	De gueules au chef d'or.	Gules, a chief Or. (La Neuville, Fresnes-sur-Escaut, Ostricourt, Phalempin and Sainghin-en-Weppes use the same arms.)
	Oudezeele	D'argent à trois cors de sable, liés de gueules, virolés d'or, les embouchures à senestre.	Argent, 3 horns sable tied gules. (Hardifort, Merris and Oudezeele use the same arms.)
	Oxelaëre	Échiqueté d'or et de gueules.	Chequy Or and gules. (Oxelaëre, Quesnoy-sur-Deûle and Sars-et-Rosières use the same arms.)

== P ==
Image	Name of Commune	French blazon	English blazon
	Paillencourt	De gueules à deux léopards d'argent passant l'un sur l'autre, et une bordure d'or.	Gules two leopards argent within a bordure or.
	Pecquencourt	D'azur semé de fleurs de lis d'or, au cerf d'argent passant sur le tout.	Azure semy de lys Or, a stag argent. (Capelle, Loffre, Neuville-Saint-Rémy, Pecquencourt, and Vred use the same arms.)
	Pérenchies	De sinople à l'écu d'argent et un bâton componé de gueules et d'argent brochant en bande sur le tout.	Vert an inescutcheon argent overall a bend compony gules and argent.
	Péronne-en-Mélantois	D'azur à trois merlettes d'argent.	Azure three martlets argent.
	Petite-Forêt	Pas de blason connu à ce jour.	No known arms. This entry is only for the sake of completeness.
	Petit-Fayt	D'argent à trois fasces de gueules.	Argent, 3 fesses gules. (Boulogne-sur-Helpe and Petit-Fayt use the same arms.)
	Petite-Synthe; Former commune merged in 1972 with Dunkerque.	D'argent à la croix ancrée de gueules cantonnée de quatre grelots de sable.	Argent a cross moline gules between four bells sable.
	Phalempin	De gueules au chef d'or.	Gules, a chief Or. (La Neuville, Fresnes-sur-Escaut, Ostricourt, Phalempin and Sainghin-en-Weppes use the same arms.)
	Pitgam	D'azur à une fasce d'argent.	Azure, a fess argent. (Pitgam, Châteauponsac, Fénétrange use the same arms.)
	Poix-du-Nord	De vair à trois pals de gueules.	Vair, 3 pales gules. (Englefontaine, Louvignies-Quesnoy, Poix-du-Nord and Saint-Waast-la-Vallée use the same arms.)
	Pommereuil	D'argent à la croix ancrée de sable.	Argent, a cross moline sable. (Challes-les-Eaux, Montalembert, Neuvilly and Pommereuil use the same arms.)
	Pont-à-Marcq	De sable à l'aigle d'argent becquée et membrée d'or.	Sable, an eagle argent, beaked and membered Or. (La Madeleine and Pont-à-Marcq use the same arms.)
	Pont-sur-Sambre	D'azur au lion d'or tenant en ses pattes une clef d'argent, le panneton en haut et à dextre.	Azure, a lion Or maintaining a key argent. (Dourlers, Pont-sur-Sambre and Rainsars use the same arms.)
	Potelle	D'azur à la bande d'or, accompagné de six besants du même mis en orle.	Azure, a bend Or between 6 bezants (Or). (Aulnoy-lez-Valenciennes, Bantouzelle, Briastre, Noyelles-sur-Selle and Potelle use the same arms.)
	Pradelles	D'argent au chevron de gueules, accompagné de trois merlettes de sable.	Argent a chevron gules between three martlets sable.
	Prémesques	Burelé vivré d'argent et d'azur de douze pièces.	Barry indented argent and azure.
	Préseau	Vairé d'or et de sable, au croissant de gueules brochant sur le tout.	Vairy or and sable a crescent gules.
	Preux-au-Bois	Ecartelé: aux 1 et 4, d'argent à la fasce de sable; aux 2 et 3, d'or à la croix ancrée de sable.	Quarterly 1&4: Argent, a fess sable; 2&3: Or, a cross moline sable. (Bellaing, Oisy and Preux-au-Bois use the same arms.)
	Preux-au-Sart	De gueules à cinq fusées d'argent accolées en fasce et touchant les flancs de l'écu.	Gules five fusils conjoined in fess argent.
	Prisches	D'azur à la fasce d'or.	Azure, a fess Or. (Beaurepaire-sur-Sambre, Borre, Morbecque, Prisches, Cazilhac and Aubière use the same arms.)
	Prouvy	D'or à un trécheur fleuronné de sinople et une fasce de gueules frettée d'argent brochant sur le tout.	Or a tressure flory vert overall a fess gules fretty argent.
	Proville	De gueules au croissant d'argent.	Gules a crescent argent.
	Provin	D'azur à six étoiles à six rais d'or, 3, 2 et 1.	Azure six mullets or of six points 3,2,1.
