= Méresse =

Méresse is a surname. Notable people with the surname include:

- David Méresse (1931–2020), French footballer
- Zaïna Méresse (1935–2014), Mahorese politician
