= David Méresse =

French footballer (1931–2020)

Personal information
- Date of birth: 16 February 1931
- Place of birth: Cambrai, France
- Date of death: 8 April 2020 (aged 89)
- Place of death: Neuville-Saint-Rémy, France

Youth career
- 1945–1950: AC Cambrai

Senior career*
Years	Team	Apps	(Gls)
1950–1957	CO Roubaix-Tourcoing	77	(5)
1957–1958	FC Sète 34	1	(0)
Total		78	(5)
- * Club domestic league appearances and goals

David Méresse (16 February 1931 – 8 April 2020) was a French football player and coach.

== Biography ==
Méresse played his junior career with AC Cambrai from 1945 to 1950. He then joined CO Roubaix-Tourcoing, with which he played 24 Ligue 1 games and 48 Ligue 2 games between 1950 and 1957. He was selected for the French Military Team in 1951 for the Bataillon de Joinville. After one season with FC Sète 34, Méresse retired and returned to AC Cambrai, where he was coach and president from 1982 to 1991. He recorded 78 matches and 5 goals.

He was secretary general then vice-president of the Scheldt District, member of the Nord-Pas-de-Calais League Council and member of the Central Commission for the National Championship of the French Football Federation (FFF). He ran a café in Cambrai, and was also a correspondent for L'Équipe, France Football, Nord Matin, and La Voix des Sports. He received the FFF gold medal in 2008.

Méresse died, aged 89, after contracting the COVID-19 virus.
