= Helpe Mineure =

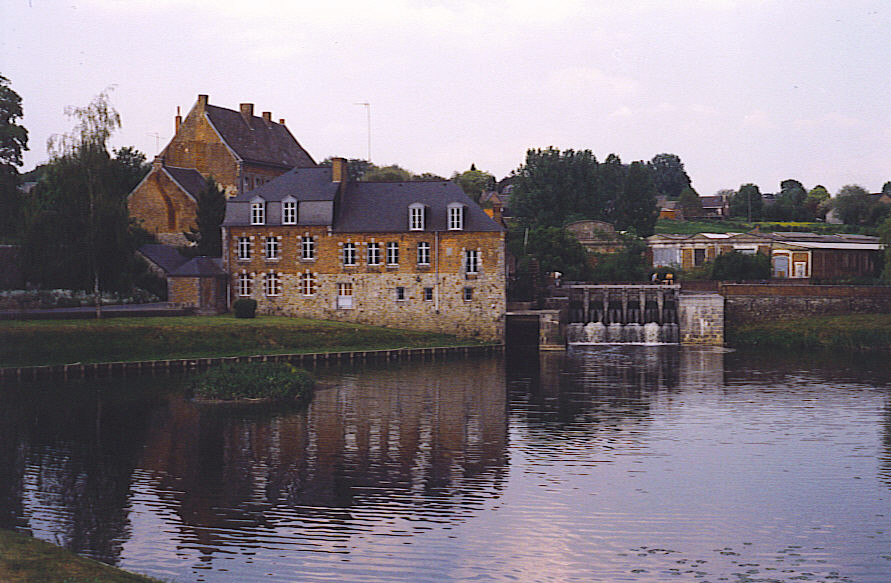
- An old water mill on the Helpe Mineure at Maroilles

- Location within France Location within Hauts-de-France

Location
- Country: France

Physical characteristics
- Mouth: Sambre
  - coordinates: 50°09′08″N 3°43′43″E
- Length: 51 km (32 mi)
- Basin size: 275 km^{2} (106 mi^{2})
- Discharge
  - average: 3.76 m^{3}/s (133 cu ft/s)

Basin features
- Progression: Sambre→ Meuse→ North Sea

The Helpe Mineure (French pronunciation: [ɛlp minœʁ], literally Helpe Minor or Little Helpe) is a river in France, which flows through the regions of Hauts-de-France. It arises in the municipality of Ohain at the confluence of two source streams. The river drains and flows in a generally north-westerly direction for about 50 kilometres (31 mi) before it flows into its confluence as a southern tributary of the Sambre north-west of Maroilles.
