= Salesches =

- Commune
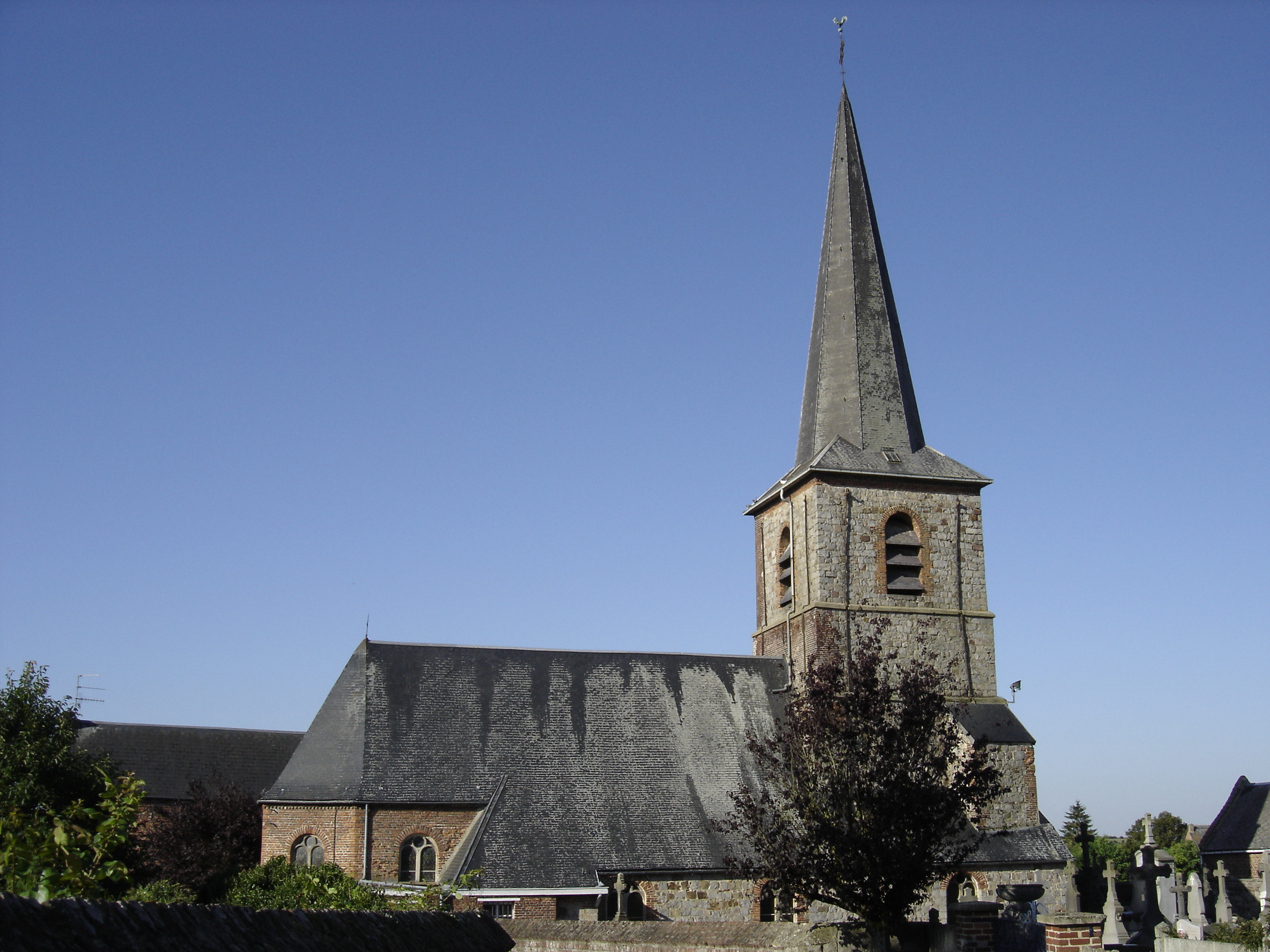
- The church in Salesches

- Coat of arms
- Location of Salesches
- Location within France Location within Hauts-de-France
- Coordinates: 50°12′14″N 3°35′18″E
- Country: France
- Region: Hauts-de-France
- Department: Nord
- Arrondissement: Avesnes-sur-Helpe
- Canton: Avesnes-sur-Helpe
- Intercommunality: CC Pays de Mormal

Government
  - Mayor (2020–2026): Patrick Piana
- Area^{1}: 4.58 km^{2} (1.77 sq mi)
- Elevation: 130 m (430 ft)
- Highest elevation: 138 m (453 ft)
- Lowest elevation: 85 m (279 ft)
- Population (2023): 327
  - Density: 71.4/km^{2} (185/sq mi)
- Time zone: UTC+01:00 (CET)
  - Summer (DST): UTC+02:00 (CEST)
- INSEE/Postal code: 59549 /59218
- ^{1} French Land Register data, which excludes lakes, ponds, glaciers > 1 km^{2} (0.386 sq mi or 247 acres) and river estuaries.

Salesches (French pronunciation: [salɛʃ]) is a commune in the Nord department in northern France. It is located 6 km south of Le Quesnoy.

== History ==
The village dates back to 1131, when it was recorded as part of the property of the Abbey of Maroilles, later passing to the bishop of Cambrai. Most of the local economy was agricultural, with two water mills to make flour.

== Churches ==
The parish church is dedicated to Saint-Quinibert. In addition to the parish church, there is a small chapel, Chapelle Notre Dame des Prés, located alongside the Saint-Georges stream, accessible by foot from the rue de Viterlan.

== Heraldry ==
Arms of Salesches	The arms of Salesches are blazoned : Argent, a stag's massacre gules surmounting a crozier palewise Or. (Marbaix, Maroilles, Noyelles-sur-Sambre, and Salesches use the same arms.)

== See also ==
- Communes of the Nord department
