= Ansacq =

- Commune
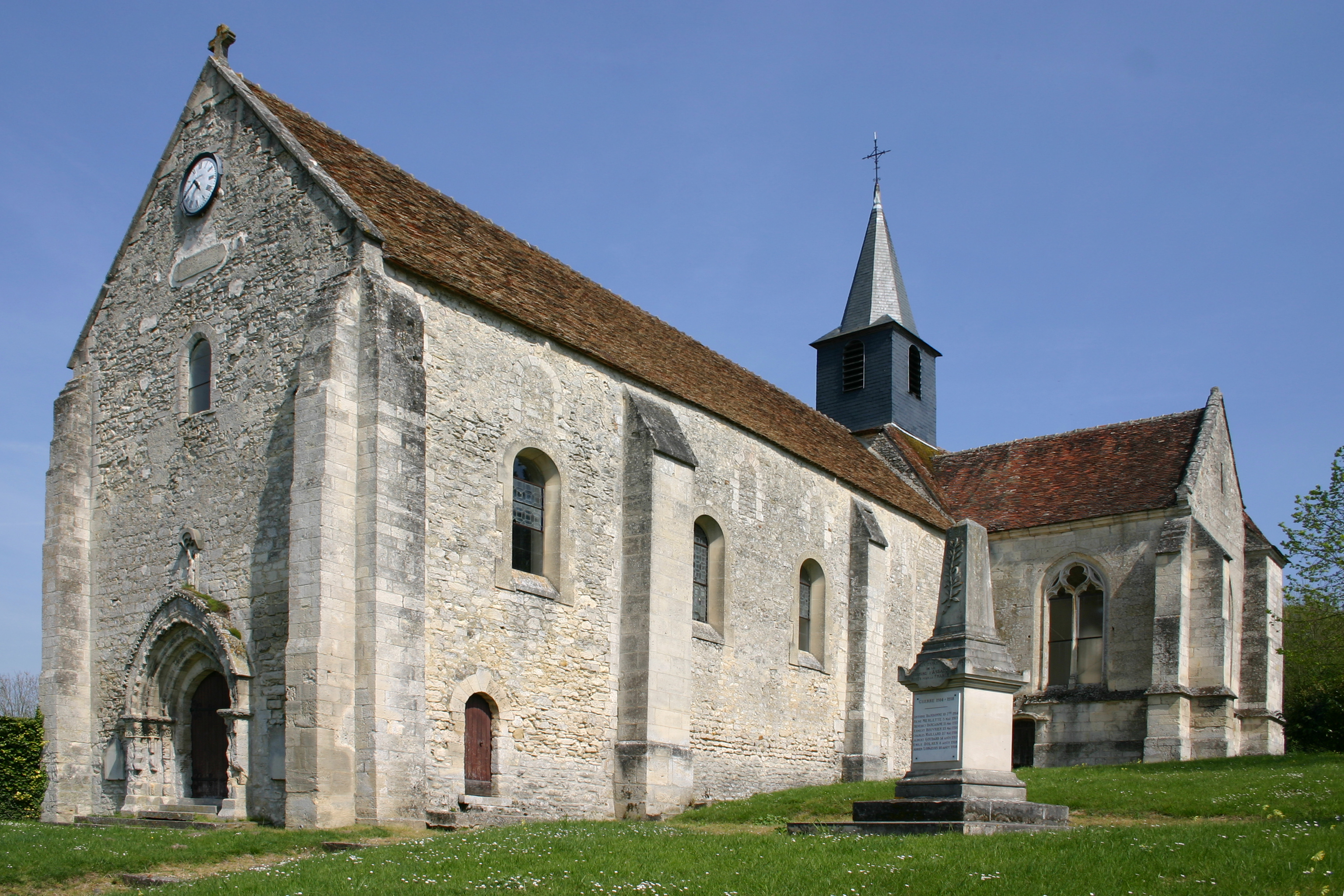
- The church in Ansacq

- Coat of arms
- Location of Ansacq
- Location within France Location within Hauts-de-France
- Coordinates: 49°20′43″N 2°21′36″E
- Country: France
- Region: Hauts-de-France
- Department: Oise
- Arrondissement: Clermont
- Canton: Mouy
- Intercommunality: Clermontois

Government
  - Mayor (2020–2026): Christine Marienval
- Area^{1}: 8.4 km^{2} (3.2 sq mi)
- Elevation: 120 m (390 ft)
- Highest elevation: 151 m (495 ft)
- Lowest elevation: 60 m (200 ft)
- Population (2023): 273
  - Density: 33/km^{2} (84/sq mi)
- Time zone: UTC+01:00 (CET)
  - Summer (DST): UTC+02:00 (CEST)
- INSEE/Postal code: 60016 /60250
- ^{1} French Land Register data, which excludes lakes, ponds, glaciers > 1 km^{2} (0.386 sq mi or 247 acres) and river estuaries.

Ansacq (French pronunciation: [ɑ̃sak]) is a commune in the Oise department in northern France.

== Population ==
Historical population
Year	Pop.	±% p.a.
1968	103	—
1975	88	−2.22%
1982	135	+6.30%
1990	228	+6.77%
1999	263	+1.60%
2007	267	+0.19%
2012	269	+0.15%
2017	276	+0.52%
2023	273	−0.18%
Source: INSEE

== See also ==
- Communes of the Oise department
