= Jolimetz =

- Commune
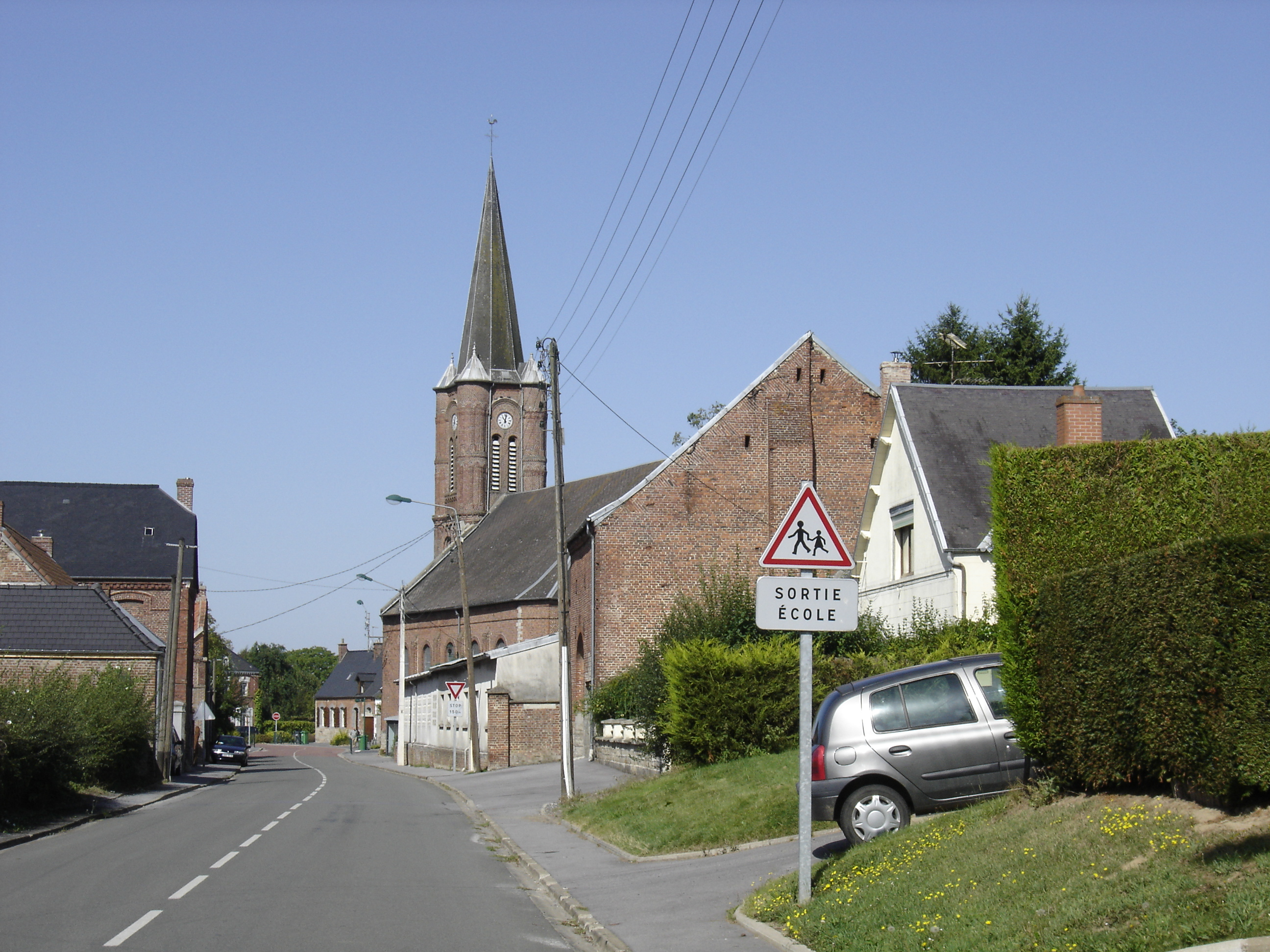
- The church in Jolimetz

- Coat of arms
- Location of Jolimetz
- Location within France Location within Hauts-de-France
- Coordinates: 50°13′44″N 3°40′34″E
- Country: France
- Region: Hauts-de-France
- Department: Nord
- Arrondissement: Avesnes-sur-Helpe
- Canton: Avesnes-sur-Helpe
- Intercommunality: Pays de Mormal

Government
  - Mayor (2020–2026): Didier Debrabant
- Area^{1}: 3.98 km^{2} (1.54 sq mi)
- Elevation: 145 m (476 ft)
- Highest elevation: 151 m (495 ft)
- Lowest elevation: 126 m (413 ft)
- Population (2023): 856
  - Density: 215/km^{2} (557/sq mi)
- Time zone: UTC+01:00 (CET)
  - Summer (DST): UTC+02:00 (CEST)
- INSEE/Postal code: 59325 /59530
- ^{1} French Land Register data, which excludes lakes, ponds, glaciers > 1 km^{2} (0.386 sq mi or 247 acres) and river estuaries.

Jolimetz is a commune in the Nord department in northern France.

== Heraldry ==
Arms of Jolimetz	The arms of Jolimetz are blazoned : Azure, a bend argent. (Bouvignies, Jolimetz and Ochtezeele use the same arms.)

== See also ==
- Communes of the Nord department
