= Mecquignies =

- Commune
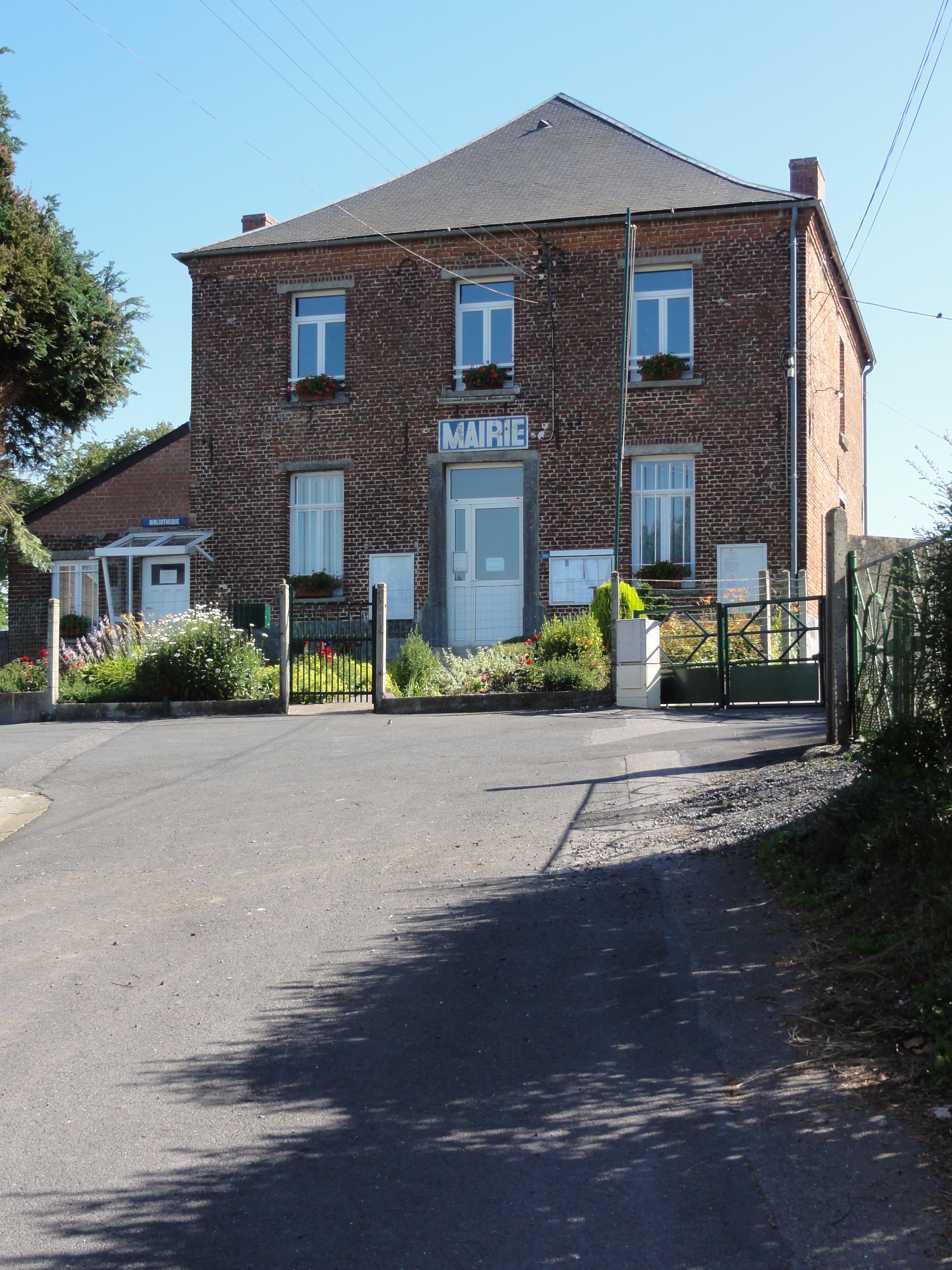
- The town hall in Mecquignies

- Coat of arms
- Location of Mecquignies
- Location within France Location within Hauts-de-France
- Coordinates: 50°16′36″N 3°47′54″E
- Country: France
- Region: Hauts-de-France
- Department: Nord
- Arrondissement: Avesnes-sur-Helpe
- Canton: Aulnoye-Aymeries
- Intercommunality: CC Pays de Mormal

Government
  - Mayor (2020–2026): Frédéric Romain
- Area^{1}: 4.78 km^{2} (1.85 sq mi)
- Elevation: 150 m (490 ft)
- Highest elevation: 160 m (520 ft)
- Lowest elevation: 118 m (387 ft)
- Population (2023): 695
  - Density: 145/km^{2} (377/sq mi)
- Time zone: UTC+01:00 (CET)
  - Summer (DST): UTC+02:00 (CEST)
- INSEE/Postal code: 59396 /59570
- ^{1} French Land Register data, which excludes lakes, ponds, glaciers > 1 km^{2} (0.386 sq mi or 247 acres) and river estuaries.

Mecquignies (French pronunciation: [mɛkiɲi]) is a commune in the Nord department in northern France.

== Heraldry ==
Arms of Mecquignies	The arms of Mecquignies are blazoned : Or, a double headed eagle sable, beaked and membered Or, langued gules. (Louvroil and Mecquignies use the same arms.)

== See also ==
- Communes of the Nord department
