= Mastaing =

- Commune
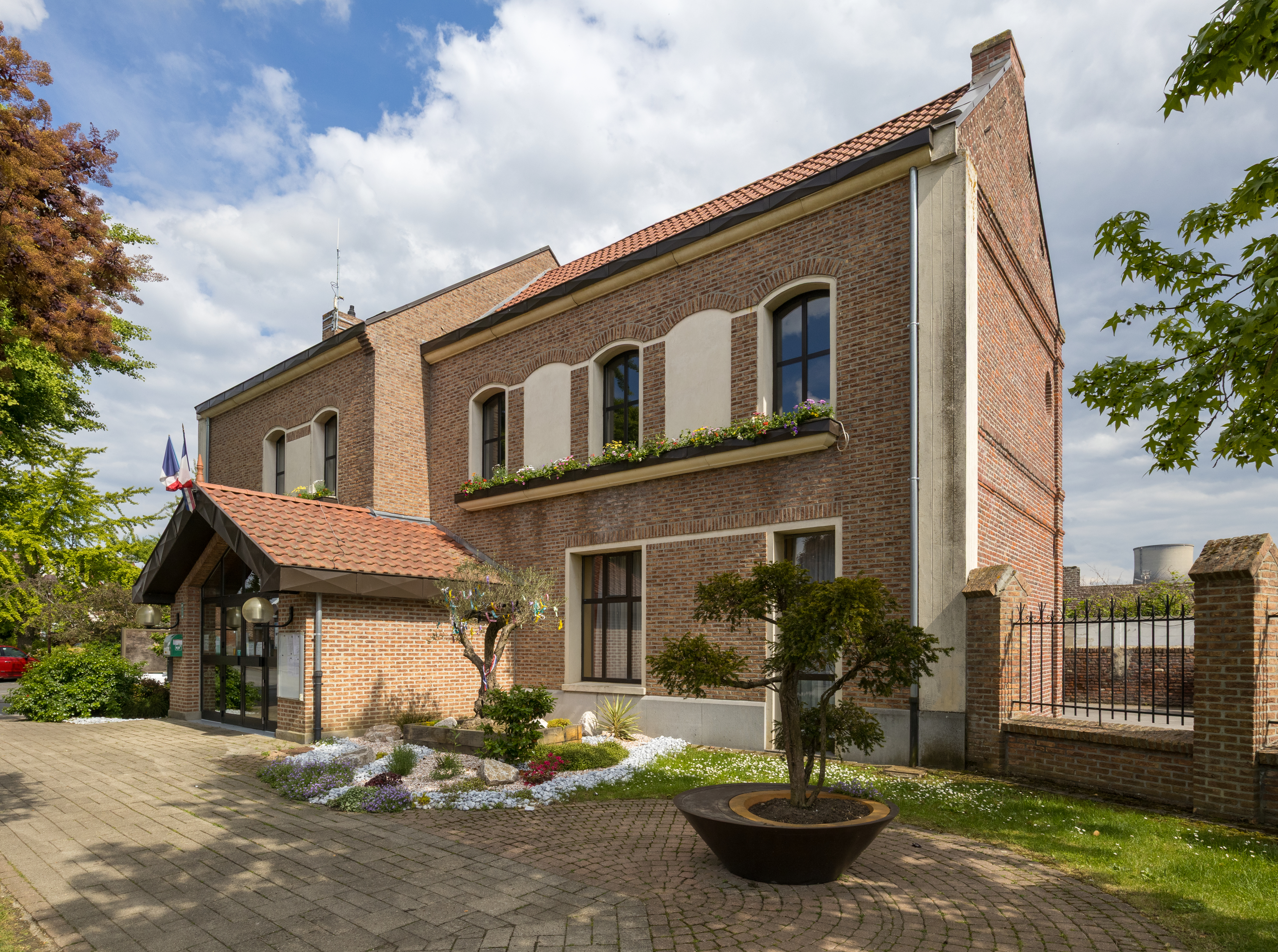
- The town hall in Mastaing

- Coat of arms
- Location of Mastaing
- Location within France Location within Hauts-de-France
- Coordinates: 50°18′25″N 3°18′14″E
- Country: France
- Region: Hauts-de-France
- Department: Nord
- Arrondissement: Valenciennes
- Canton: Denain
- Intercommunality: CA Porte du Hainaut

Government
  - Mayor (2020–2026): Ludovic Aiguier
- Area^{1}: 5.97 km^{2} (2.31 sq mi)
- Elevation: 38 m (125 ft)
- Highest elevation: 67 m (220 ft)
- Lowest elevation: 33 m (108 ft)
- Population (2023): 911
  - Density: 153/km^{2} (395/sq mi)
- Time zone: UTC+01:00 (CET)
  - Summer (DST): UTC+02:00 (CEST)
- INSEE/Postal code: 59391 /59172
- ^{1} French Land Register data, which excludes lakes, ponds, glaciers > 1 km^{2} (0.386 sq mi or 247 acres) and river estuaries.

Mastaing (French pronunciation: [mastɛ̃]) is a commune in the Nord department in northern France.

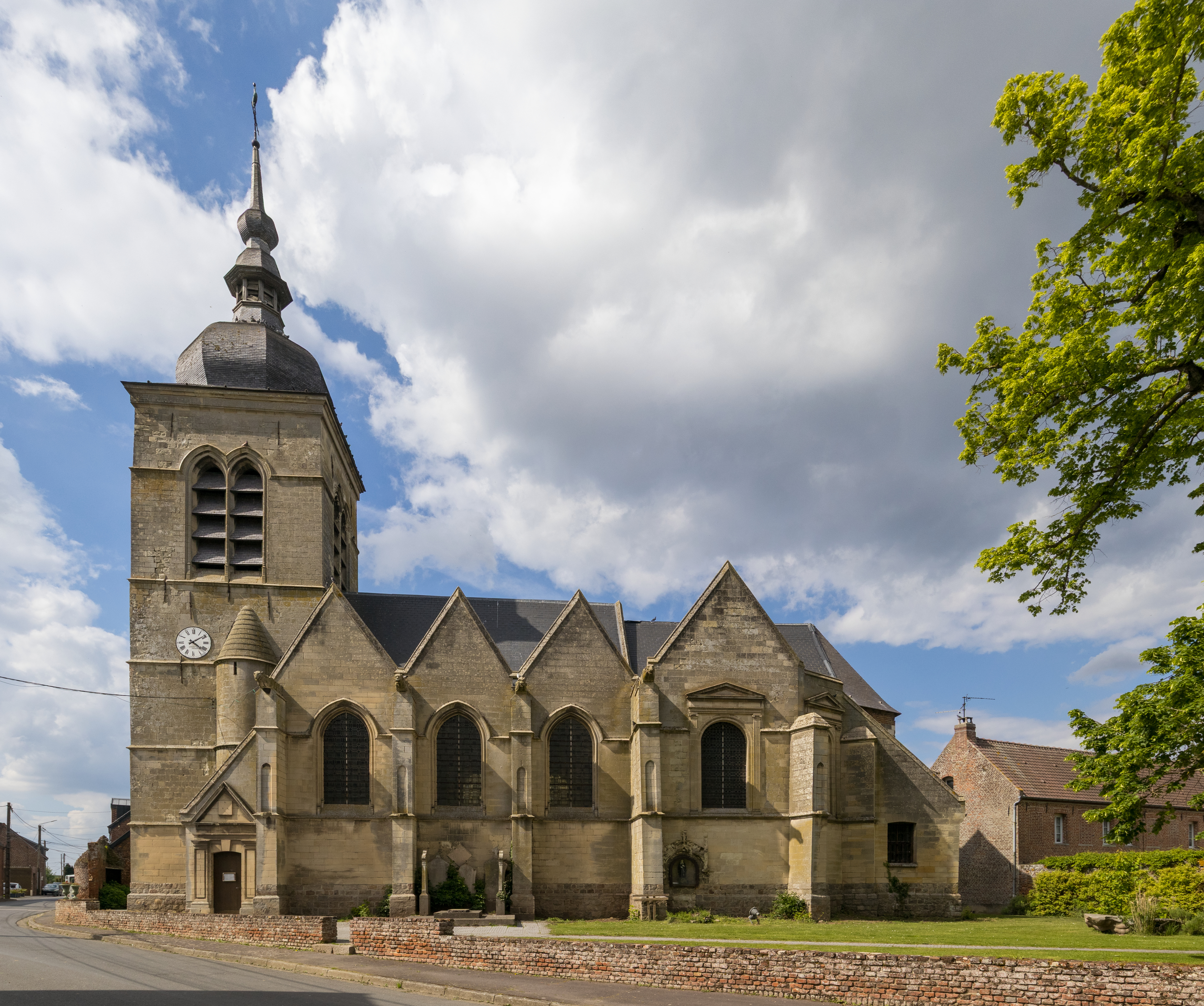
The church

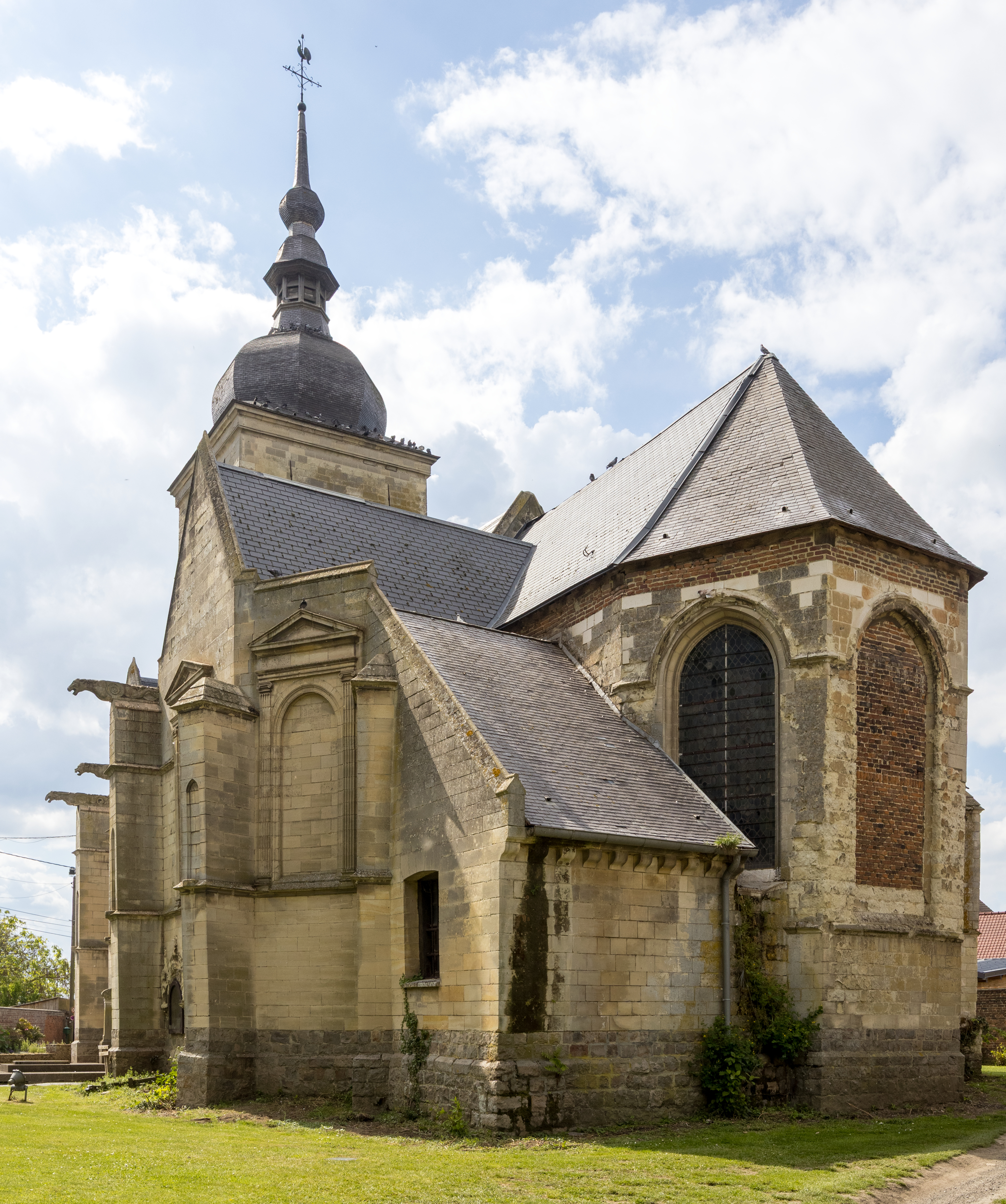

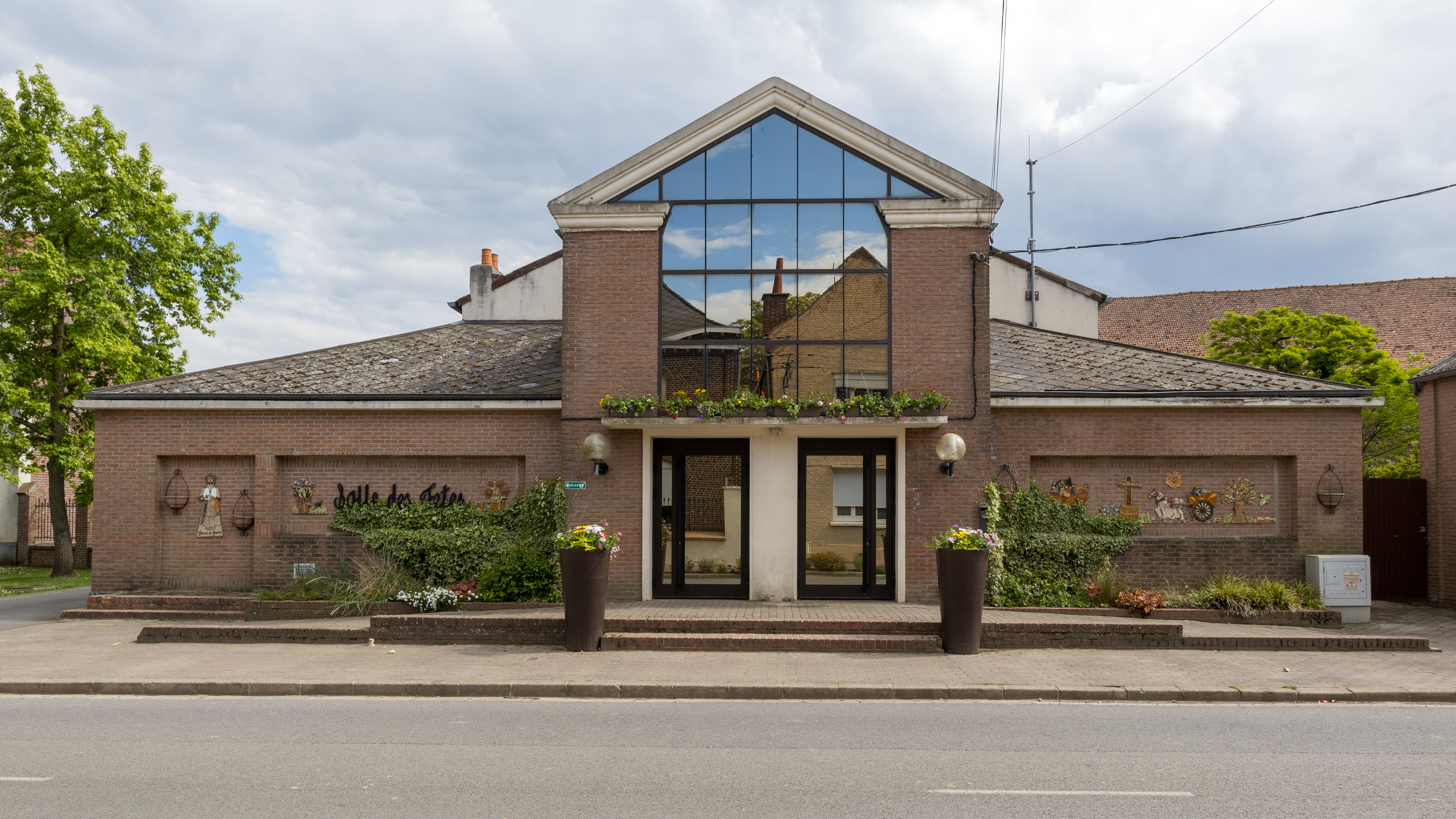
The village hall

== Heraldry ==
Arms of Mastaing	The arms of Mastaing are blazoned : Gules, a fess and in chief a vivre Or. [a vivre is a thin barrulet dancetty] (Hornaing and Mastaing use the same arms.)

== See also ==
- Communes of the Nord department
