= Montigny-en-Cambrésis =

- Commune
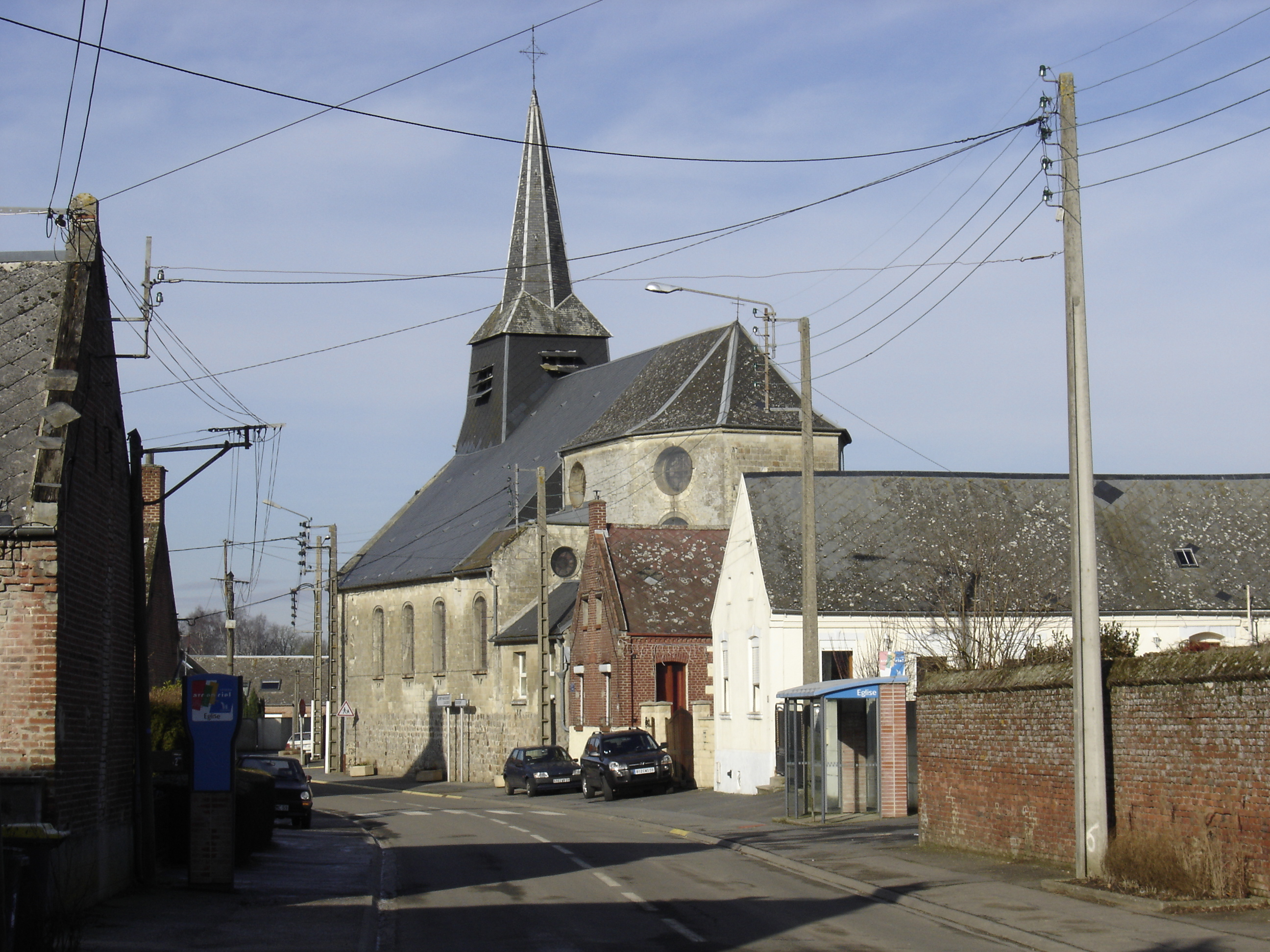
- The church in Montigny-en-Cambrésis

- Coat of arms
- Location of Montigny-en-Cambrésis
- Location within France Location within Hauts-de-France
- Coordinates: 50°05′31″N 3°24′37″E
- Country: France
- Region: Hauts-de-France
- Department: Nord
- Arrondissement: Cambrai
- Canton: Le Cateau-Cambrésis
- Intercommunality: CA Caudrésis–Catésis

Government
  - Mayor (2020–2026): Francis Gouraud
- Area^{1}: 5.87 km^{2} (2.27 sq mi)
- Highest elevation: 150 m (490 ft)
- Lowest elevation: 111 m (364 ft)
- Population (2023): 552
  - Density: 94.0/km^{2} (244/sq mi)
- Time zone: UTC+01:00 (CET)
  - Summer (DST): UTC+02:00 (CEST)
- INSEE/Postal code: 59413 /59225
- ^{1} French Land Register data, which excludes lakes, ponds, glaciers > 1 km^{2} (0.386 sq mi or 247 acres) and river estuaries.

Montigny-en-Cambrésis is a commune in the Nord department in northern France.

== Heraldry ==
Arms of Montigny-en-Cambrésis	The arms of Montigny-en-Cambrésis are blazoned : Azure, a lion argent within a bordure Or. (Maurois and Montigny-en-Cambrésis use the same arms.)

== See also ==
- Communes of the Nord department
