= Ochtezeele =

Ochtezeele Ochtezele
- Commune
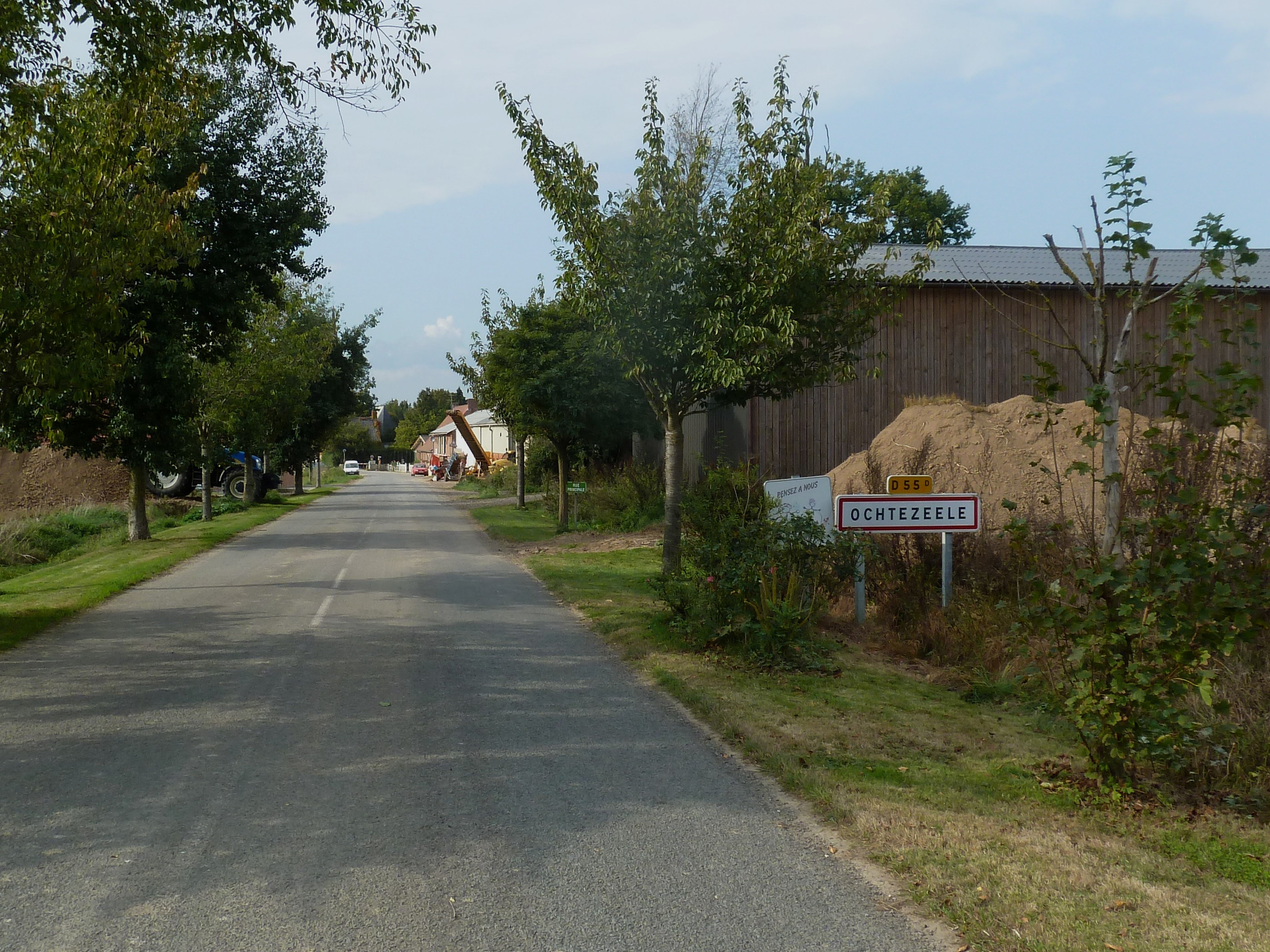
- The road into Ochtezeele
- Location of Ochtezeele
- Location within France Location within Hauts-de-France
- Coordinates: 50°49′04″N 2°24′10″E
- Country: France
- Region: Hauts-de-France
- Department: Nord
- Arrondissement: Dunkerque
- Canton: Wormhout
- Intercommunality: CA Cœur de Flandre

Government
  - Mayor (2022–2026): Joël Vermeulen
- Area^{1}: 5.58 km^{2} (2.15 sq mi)
- Elevation: 24 m (79 ft)
- Highest elevation: 62 m (203 ft)
- Lowest elevation: 19 m (62 ft)
- Population (2023): 351
  - Density: 62.9/km^{2} (163/sq mi)
- Demonym: Ochtezeelois (es)
- Time zone: UTC+01:00 (CET)
  - Summer (DST): UTC+02:00 (CEST)
- INSEE/Postal code: 59443 /59670
- ^{1} French Land Register data, which excludes lakes, ponds, glaciers > 1 km^{2} (0.386 sq mi or 247 acres) and river estuaries.

Ochtezeele (French pronunciation: [ɔktəzɛl]; from Flemish; Ochtezele in modern Dutch spelling) is a commune in the Nord department in northern France.

The small river Peene Becque flows through the village.

== Heraldry ==
Arms of Ochtezeele	The arms of Ochtezeele are blazoned : Azure, a bend argent. (Bouvignies, Jolimetz and Ochtezeele use the same arms.)

== See also ==
- Communes of the Nord department
