= Marbaix =

- Commune
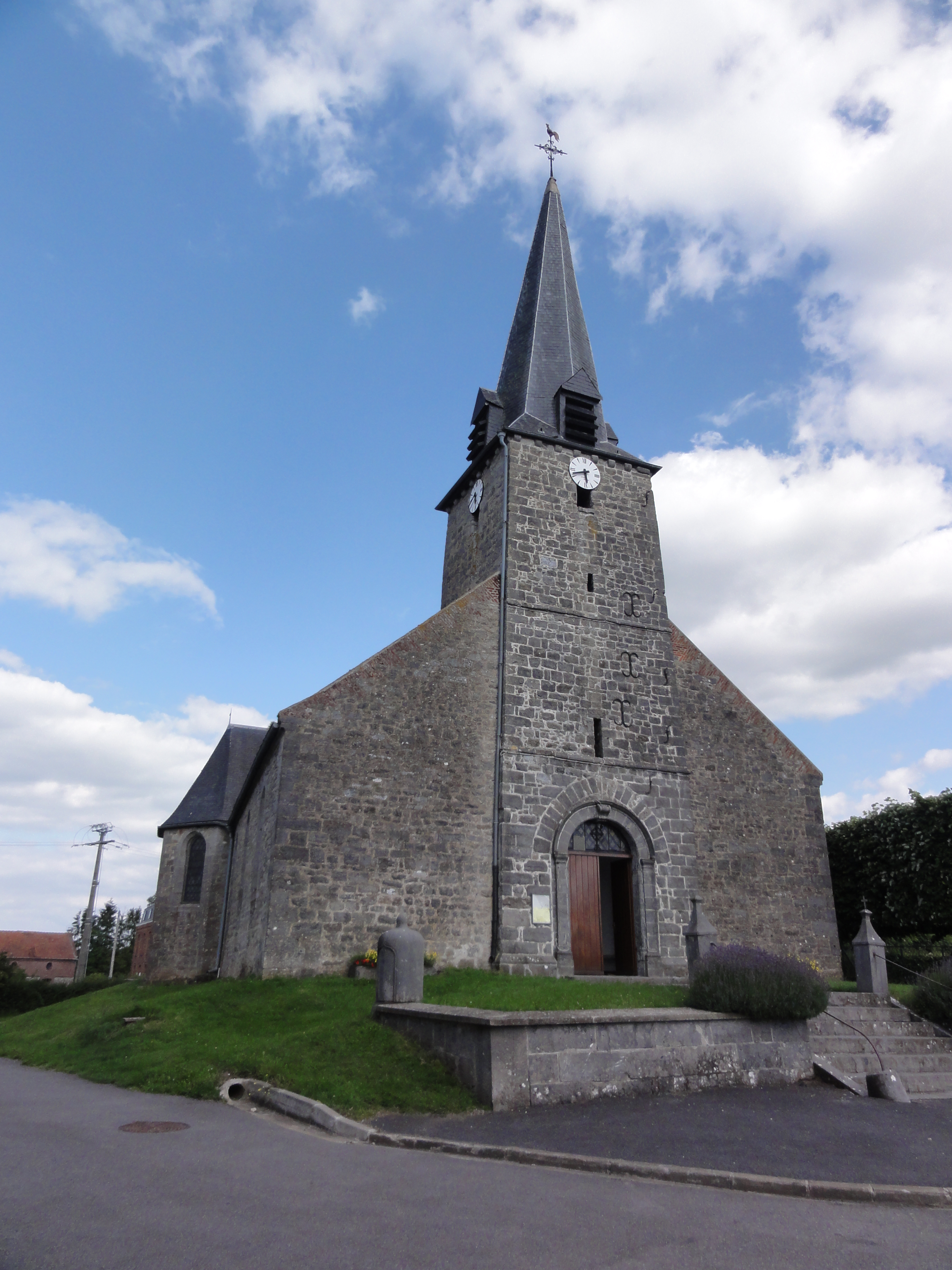
- The church in Marbaix

- Coat of arms
- Location of Marbaix
- Location within France Location within Hauts-de-France
- Coordinates: 50°07′44″N 3°50′32″E
- Country: France
- Region: Hauts-de-France
- Department: Nord
- Arrondissement: Avesnes-sur-Helpe
- Canton: Avesnes-sur-Helpe
- Intercommunality: Cœur de l'Avesnois

Government
  - Mayor (2020–2026): Damien Ducanchez
- Area^{1}: 6.62 km^{2} (2.56 sq mi)
- Elevation: 140 m (460 ft)
- Highest elevation: 197 m (646 ft)
- Lowest elevation: 132 m (433 ft)
- Population (2023): 461
  - Density: 69.6/km^{2} (180/sq mi)
- Time zone: UTC+01:00 (CET)
  - Summer (DST): UTC+02:00 (CEST)
- INSEE/Postal code: 59374 /59440
- ^{1} French Land Register data, which excludes lakes, ponds, glaciers > 1 km^{2} (0.386 sq mi or 247 acres) and river estuaries.

Marbaix (French pronunciation: [maʁbɛ]) is a commune in the Nord department in northern France.

== Etymology ==
Marbaix has historically been attested as Marbasio in 1151. The toponym Marbaix is of Germanic origin, deriving from a High German dialect, ultimately from Proto-West-Germanic *marh. The Germanic hydronym *-bak(i) entered the French language via High German, and took on two forms: the Germanic form -bach and Romantic -bais.

== Heraldry ==
Arms of Marbaix	The arms of Marbaix are blazoned : Argent, a stag's massacre gules surmounting a crozier palewise Or. (Marbaix, Maroilles, Noyelles-sur-Sambre, and Salesches use the same arms.)

== See also ==
- Communes of the Nord department
