= Maroilles, Nord =

Maroilles Marolles (Picard)
- Commune
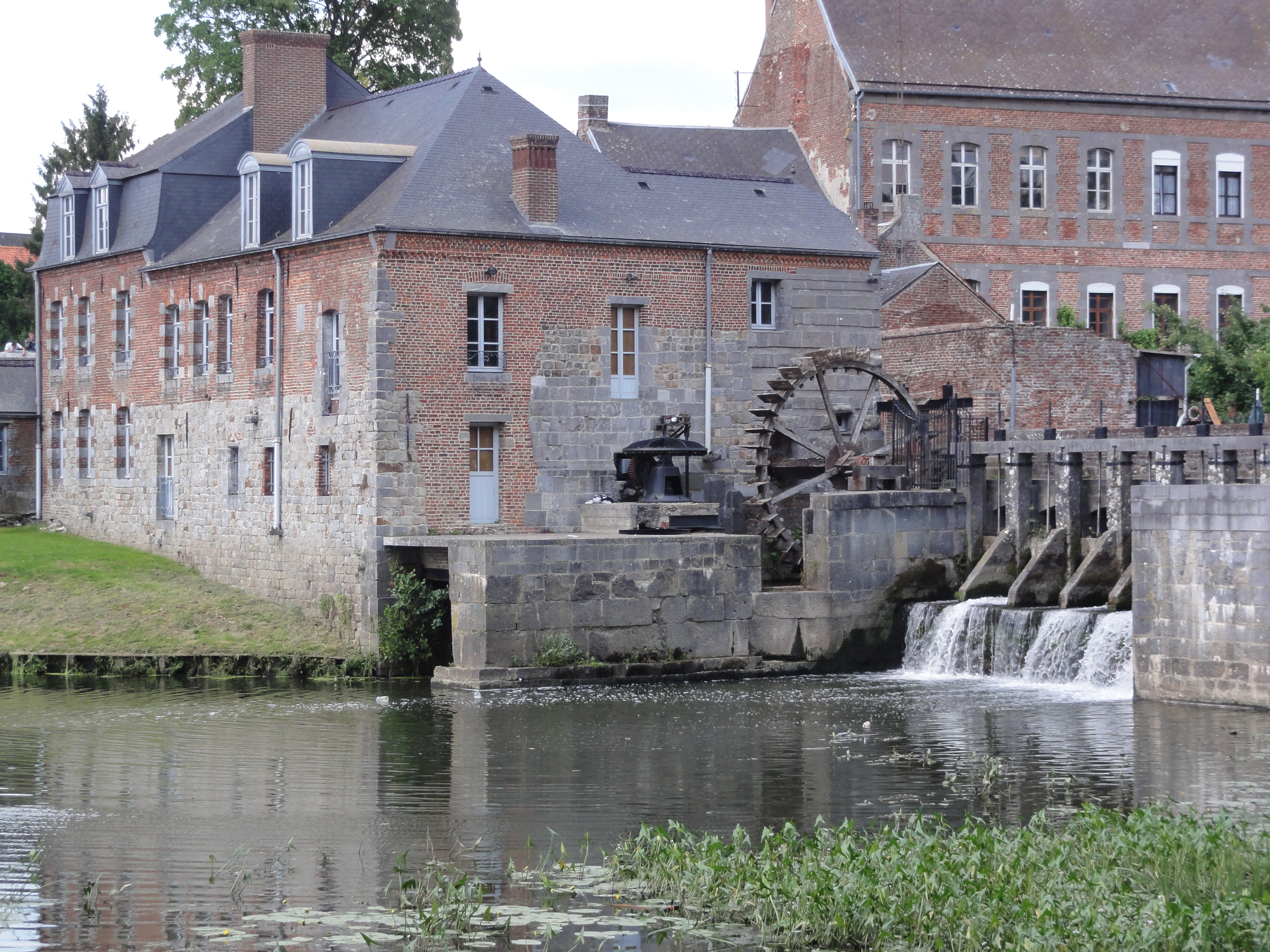
- An old water mill on the Helpe Mineure at Maroilles.

- Coat of arms
- Location of Maroilles
- Location within France Location within Hauts-de-France
- Coordinates: 50°08′09″N 3°45′42″E
- Country: France
- Region: Hauts-de-France
- Department: Nord
- Arrondissement: Avesnes-sur-Helpe
- Canton: Avesnes-sur-Helpe
- Intercommunality: Pays de Mormal

Government
  - Mayor (2020–2026): Dominique Quinzin
- Area^{1}: 22.13 km^{2} (8.54 sq mi)
- Elevation: 186 m (610 ft)
- Highest elevation: 191 m (627 ft)
- Lowest elevation: 125 m (410 ft)
- Population (2023): 1,454
  - Density: 65.70/km^{2} (170.2/sq mi)
- Time zone: UTC+01:00 (CET)
  - Summer (DST): UTC+02:00 (CEST)
- INSEE/Postal code: 59384 /59550
- ^{1} French Land Register data, which excludes lakes, ponds, glaciers > 1 km^{2} (0.386 sq mi or 247 acres) and river estuaries.

Maroilles (French: [maʁwal]; Picard: Marolles [maˈʀɔl]; older Dutch: Marolle [maːˈrɔlə]) is a commune in the Nord department, northern France.

== Heraldry ==
Arms of Maroilles	The arms of Maroilles are blazoned : Argent, a stag's massacre gules surmounting a crozier palewise Or. (Marbaix, Maroilles, Noyelles-sur-Sambre, and Salesches use the same arms.)

== See also ==
- Communes of the Nord department
- Maroilles (cheese)
