= Capelle, Nord =

Capelle
- Commune
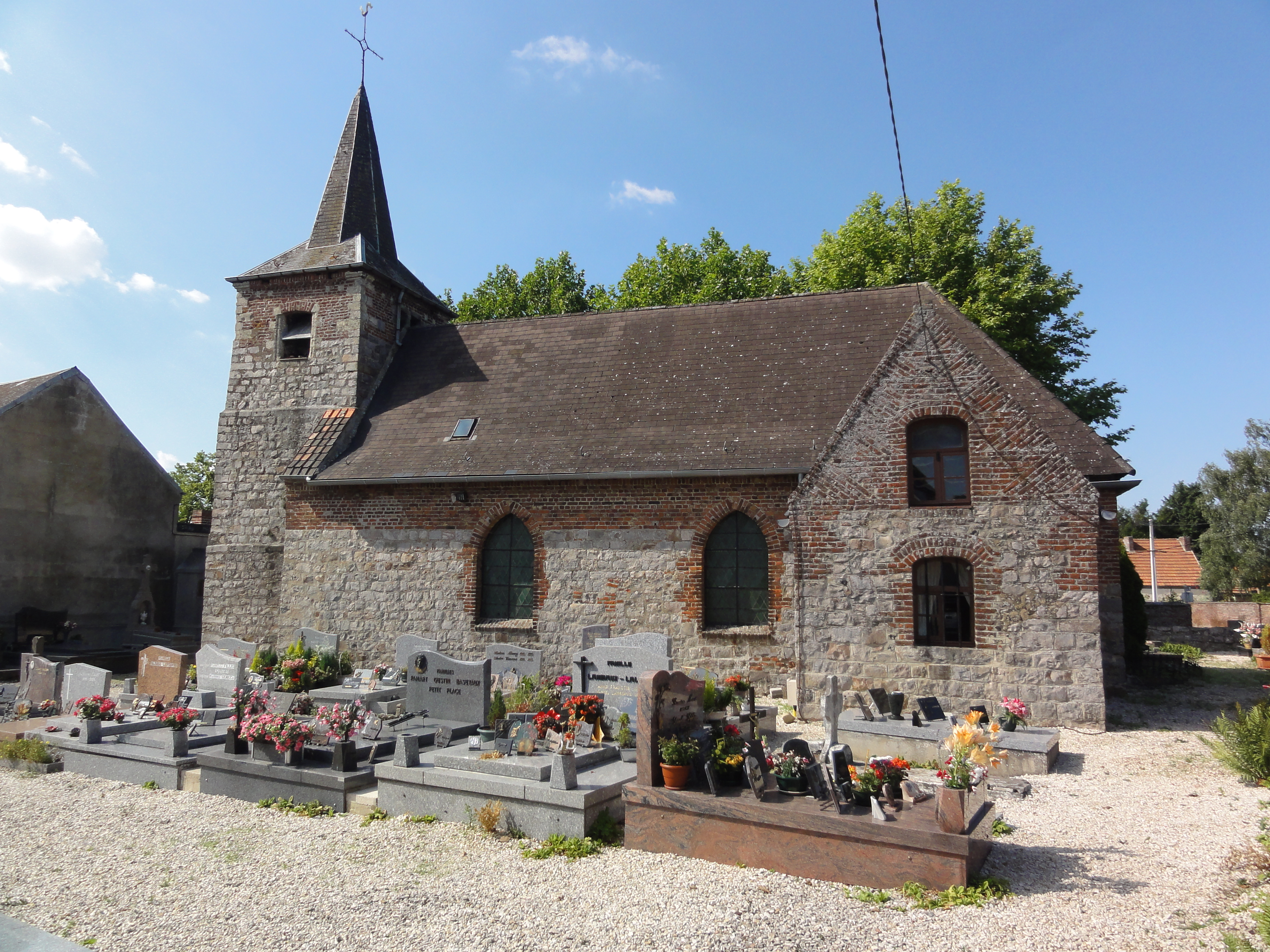
- The church in Capelle

- Coat of arms
- Location of Capelle
- Location within France Location within Hauts-de-France
- Coordinates: 50°14′19″N 3°32′55″E
- Country: France
- Region: Hauts-de-France
- Department: Nord
- Arrondissement: Cambrai
- Canton: Caudry
- Intercommunality: CC Pays Solesmois

Government
  - Mayor (2020–2026): Christophe Bisiaux
- Area^{1}: 5.07 km^{2} (1.96 sq mi)
- Highest elevation: 116 m (381 ft)
- Lowest elevation: 57 m (187 ft)
- Population (2023): 135
  - Density: 26.6/km^{2} (69.0/sq mi)
- Time zone: UTC+01:00 (CET)
  - Summer (DST): UTC+02:00 (CEST)
- INSEE/Postal code: 59127 /59213
- ^{1} French Land Register data, which excludes lakes, ponds, glaciers > 1 km^{2} (0.386 sq mi or 247 acres) and river estuaries.

Capelle (French pronunciation: [kapɛl]) is a commune in the Nord department in northern France.

== Heraldry ==
| Arms of Capelle | The arms of Capelle are blazoned : Azure semy de lys Or, a stag argent. (Capelle, Loffre, Neuville-Saint-Rémy, Pecquencourt, and Vred use the same arms.) |

== See also ==
- Communes of the Nord department
