= La Motte-au-Bois =

Former commune in Nord, France

Coordinates: 50°41′N 2°34′E

La Motte-aux-Bois (French pronunciation: [la mɔt o bwa]) is a former commune in the Nord department in northern France. It was absorbed by Morbecque some time between 1790 and 1794.

== Heraldry ==
Arms of La Motte-aux-Bois	The arms of La Motte-aux-Bois are blazoned : Gules, a castle Or, within a bordure azure charged with 5 churches Or.

== See also ==
- Communes of the Nord department
