= Maurois =

- Commune
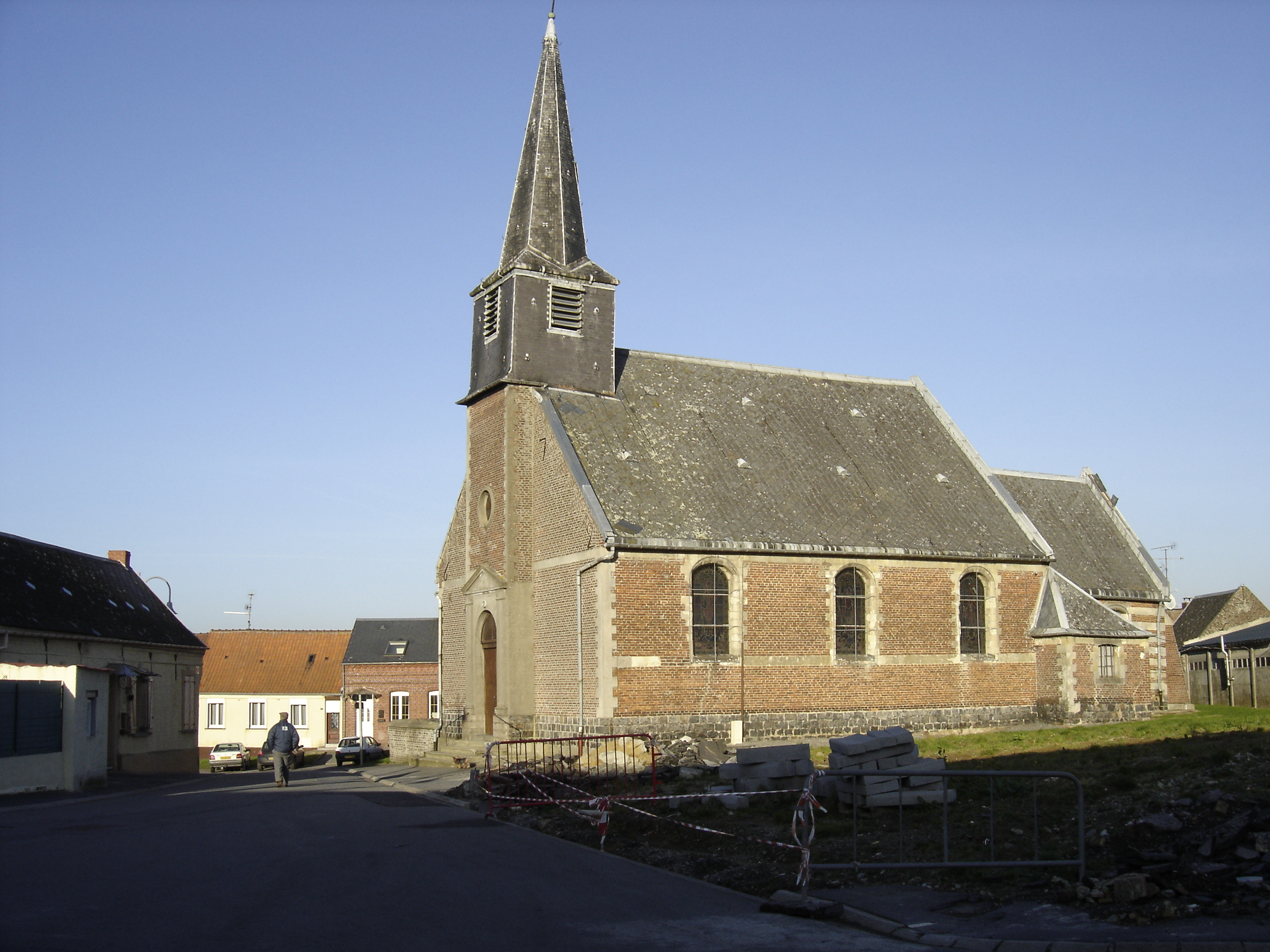
- The church in Maurois

- Coat of arms
- Location of Maurois
- Location within France Location within Hauts-de-France
- Coordinates: 50°04′21″N 3°28′01″E
- Country: France
- Region: Hauts-de-France
- Department: Nord
- Arrondissement: Cambrai
- Canton: Le Cateau-Cambrésis
- Intercommunality: CA Caudrésis–Catésis

Government
  - Mayor (2020–2026): Bernadette Dubuis
- Area^{1}: 2.11 km^{2} (0.81 sq mi)
- Highest elevation: 151 m (495 ft)
- Lowest elevation: 126 m (413 ft)
- Population (2023): 405
  - Density: 192/km^{2} (497/sq mi)
- Time zone: UTC+01:00 (CET)
  - Summer (DST): UTC+02:00 (CEST)
- INSEE/Postal code: 59394 /59980
- ^{1} French Land Register data, which excludes lakes, ponds, glaciers > 1 km^{2} (0.386 sq mi or 247 acres) and river estuaries.

Maurois (French pronunciation: [moʁwa]) is a commune in the Nord department in northern France. Maurois station has rail connections to Douai and Saint-Quentin.

== Heraldry ==
Arms of Maurois	The arms of Maurois are blazoned : Azure, a lion argent within a bordure Or. (Maurois and Montigny-en-Cambrésis use the same arms.)

== See also ==
- Communes of the Nord department
