= Louvignies-Bavay =

Coordinates: 50°18′N 3°48′E

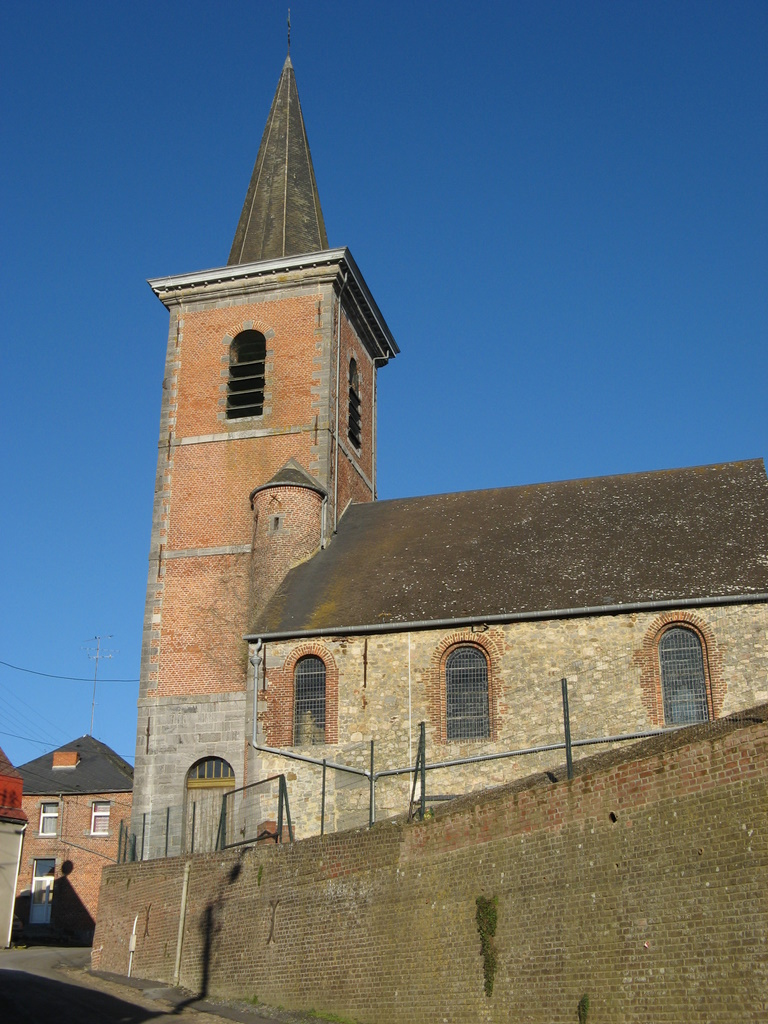
Church, Bavay, France

Louvignies-Bavay is a former commune in the Nord department in northern France. In 1946 it was merged into Bavay.

== Heraldry ==
Arms of Louvignies-Bavay	The arms of Louvignies-Bavay are blazoned : Gules semy of billets, a lion argent langued gules.

== See also ==
- Communes of the Nord department
