= Vred =

- Commune
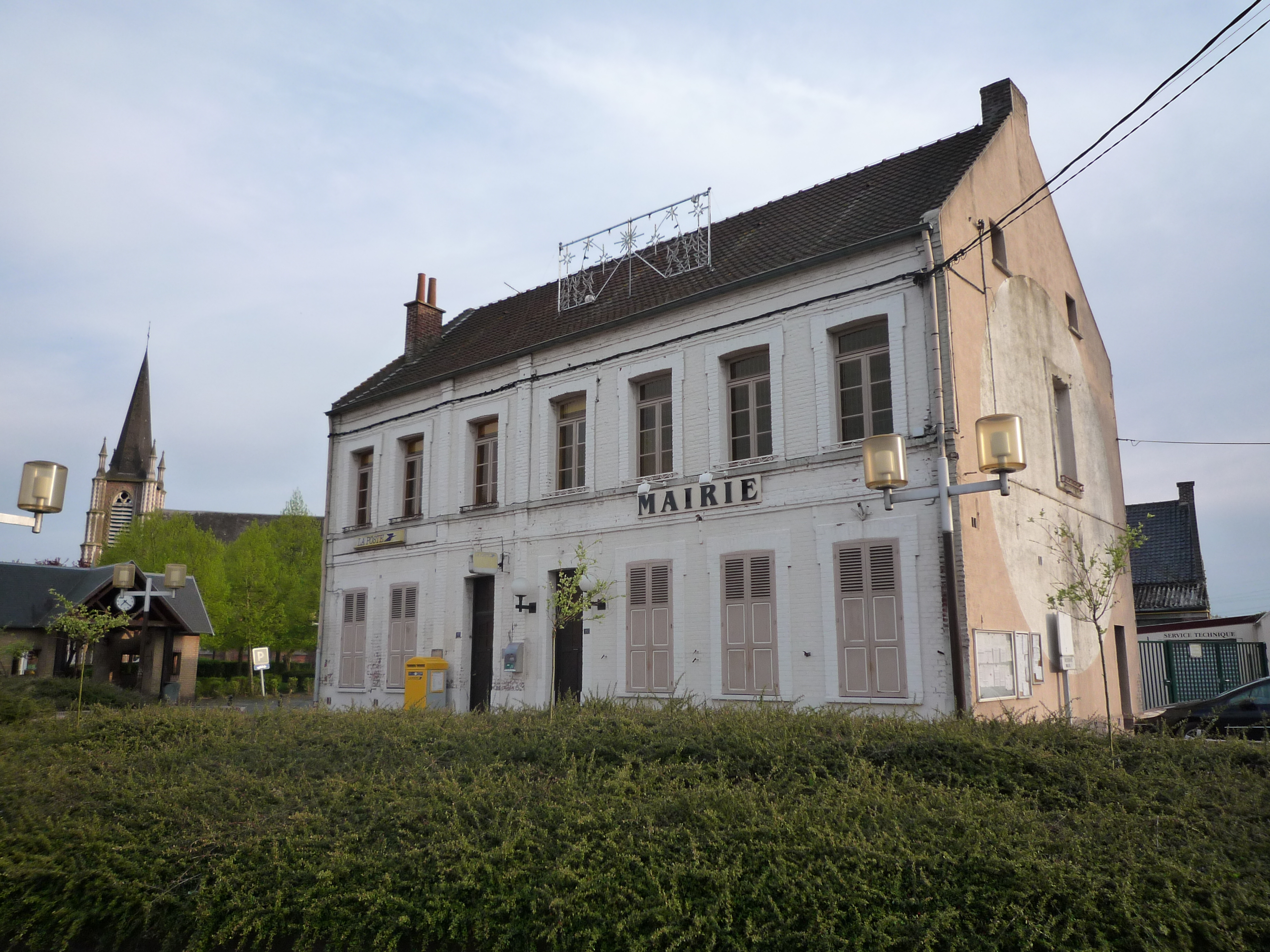
- The town hall in Vred

- Coat of arms
- Location of Vred
- Location within France Location within Hauts-de-France
- Coordinates: 50°23′41″N 3°13′56″E
- Country: France
- Region: Hauts-de-France
- Department: Nord
- Arrondissement: Douai
- Canton: Sin-le-Noble
- Intercommunality: Cœur d'Ostrevent

Government
  - Mayor (2020–2026): Marie-Françoise Falempe
- Area^{1}: 3.42 km^{2} (1.32 sq mi)
- Elevation: 18 m (59 ft)
- Highest elevation: 20 m (66 ft)
- Lowest elevation: 16 m (52 ft)
- Population (2023): 1,302
  - Density: 381/km^{2} (986/sq mi)
- Time zone: UTC+01:00 (CET)
  - Summer (DST): UTC+02:00 (CEST)
- INSEE/Postal code: 59629 /59870
- ^{1} French Land Register data, which excludes lakes, ponds, glaciers > 1 km^{2} (0.386 sq mi or 247 acres) and river estuaries.

Vred (French pronunciation: [vʁɛ]) is a commune in the Nord department in northern France.

== Heraldry ==
Arms of Vred	The arms of Vred are blazoned : Azure semy de lys Or, a stag argent. (Capelle, Loffre, Neuville-Saint-Rémy, Pecquencourt, and Vred use the same arms.)

== See also ==
- Communes of the Nord department
