= Loffre =

- Commune
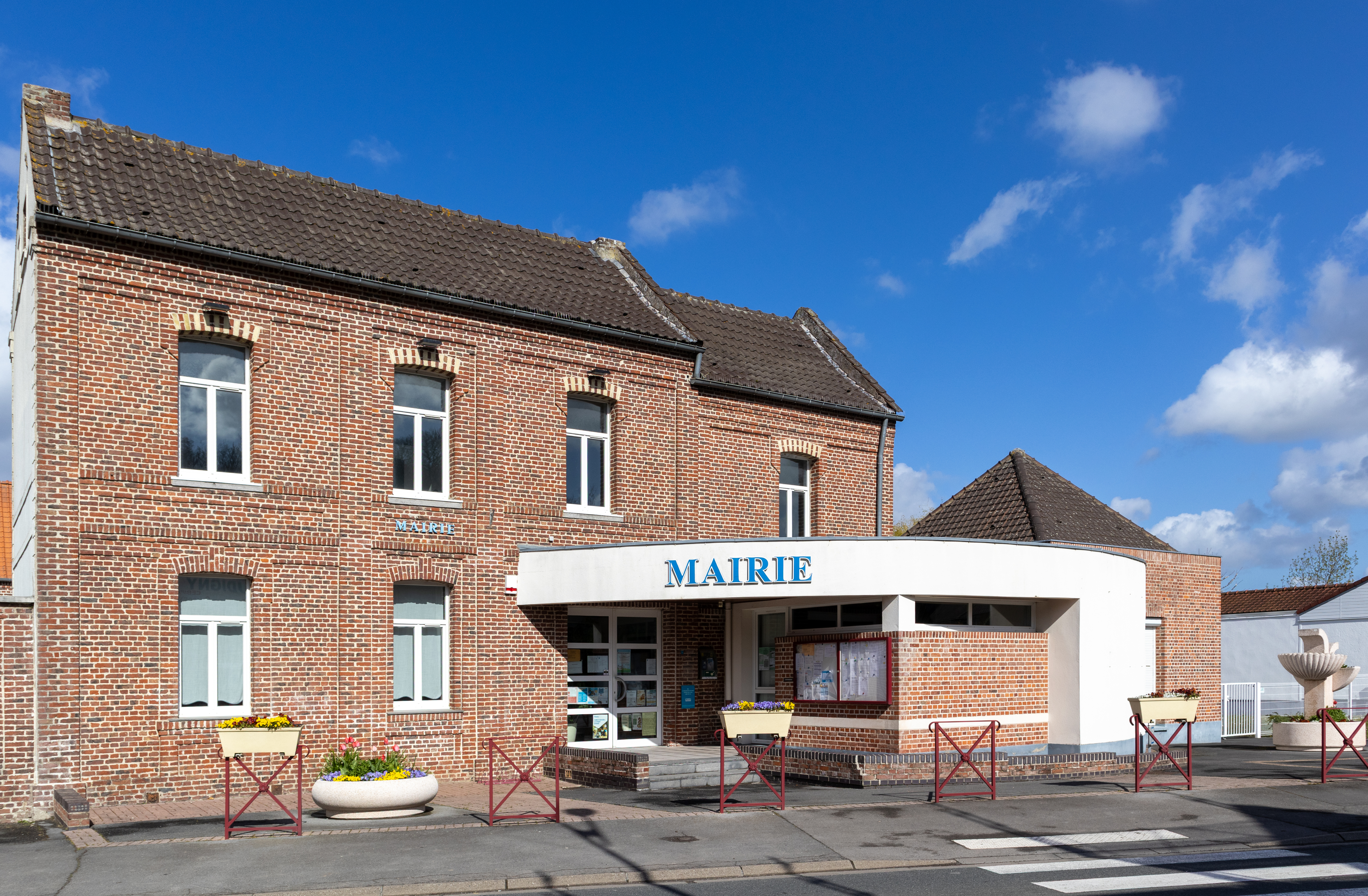
- The town hall in Loffre

- Coat of arms
- Location of Loffre
- Location within France Location within Hauts-de-France
- Coordinates: 50°21′25″N 3°10′12″E
- Country: France
- Region: Hauts-de-France
- Department: Nord
- Arrondissement: Douai
- Canton: Aniche
- Intercommunality: Cœur d'Ostrevent

Government
  - Mayor (2020–2026): Éric Gouy
- Area^{1}: 2.6 km^{2} (1.0 sq mi)
- Elevation: 26 m (85 ft)
- Highest elevation: 39 m (128 ft)
- Lowest elevation: 20 m (66 ft)
- Population (2023): 712
  - Density: 270/km^{2} (710/sq mi)
- Time zone: UTC+01:00 (CET)
  - Summer (DST): UTC+02:00 (CEST)
- INSEE/Postal code: 59354 /59182
- ^{1} French Land Register data, which excludes lakes, ponds, glaciers > 1 km^{2} (0.386 sq mi or 247 acres) and river estuaries.

Loffre (French pronunciation: [lɔfʁ]) is a commune in the Nord department in northern France.

It is 6 km (3.7 mi) east of Douai.

== History ==
=== Middle Ages ===
As soon of 1186, most of the soil of Loffre belonged to Anchin Abbay of Pecquencourt where they practised the jurisdiction.

=== Modern times ===
Loffre was for a long time an hamlet dependant of Lewarde located in the castellany of Bouchain in Hainaut.

Apparently the town was not including of churches in the starting on 17th century. From the plan of 12 May 1738 drawn by Deforest, it appears to be existing in Loffre a very important marshy area. We were counting 17 houses in the hamlet.

=== French revolution and Empire ===
Its in 1790, after the revolution, that Loffre became an independent commune

== Heraldry ==
Arms of Loffre	The arms of Loffre are blazoned : Azure semy de lys Or, a stag argent. (Capelle, Loffre, Neuville-Saint-Rémy, Pecquencourt, and Vred use the same arms.)

== See also ==
- Communes of the Nord department
