= Noyelles-sur-Sambre =

- Commune
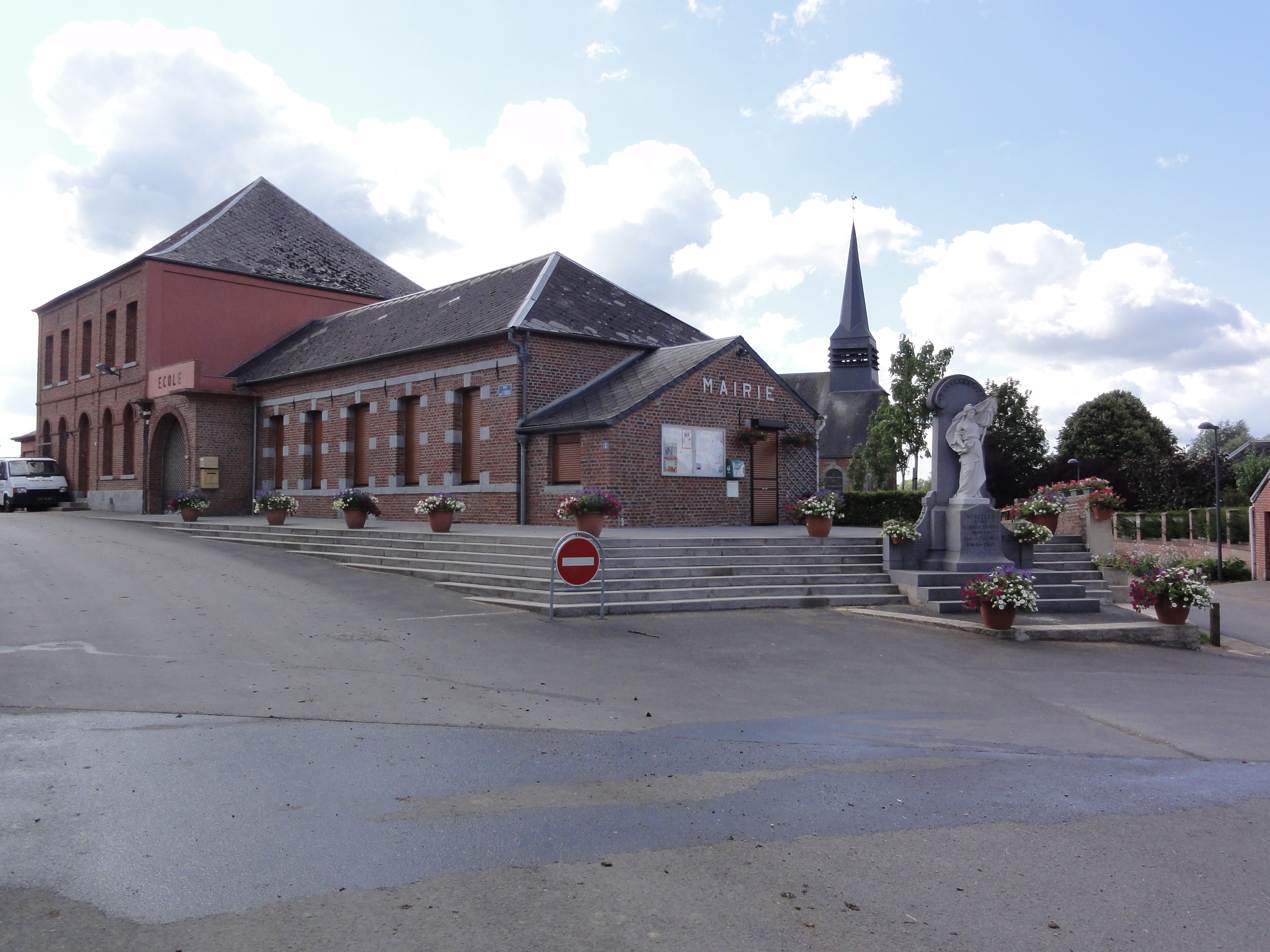
- The town hall square in Noyelles-sur-Sambre

- Coat of arms
- Location of Noyelles-sur-Sambre
- Location within France Location within Hauts-de-France
- Coordinates: 50°09′29″N 3°47′54″E
- Country: France
- Region: Hauts-de-France
- Department: Nord
- Arrondissement: Avesnes-sur-Helpe
- Canton: Aulnoye-Aymeries
- Intercommunality: CA Maubeuge Val de Sambre

Government
  - Mayor (2020–2026): Jean-Pierre Monnier
- Area^{1}: 6.49 km^{2} (2.51 sq mi)
- Elevation: 121 m (397 ft)
- Highest elevation: 170 m (560 ft)
- Lowest elevation: 128 m (420 ft)
- Population (2023): 283
  - Density: 43.6/km^{2} (113/sq mi)
- Time zone: UTC+01:00 (CET)
  - Summer (DST): UTC+02:00 (CEST)
- INSEE/Postal code: 59439 /59550
- ^{1} French Land Register data, which excludes lakes, ponds, glaciers > 1 km^{2} (0.386 sq mi or 247 acres) and river estuaries.

Noyelles-sur-Sambre (French pronunciation: [nwajɛl syʁ sɑ̃bʁ], literally Noyelles on Sambre) is a commune in the Nord department in northern France.

== Heraldry ==
Arms of Noyelles-sur-Sambre	The arms of Noyelles-sur-Sambre are blazoned : Argent, a stag's massacre gules surmounting a crozier palewise Or. (Marbaix, Maroilles, Noyelles-sur-Sambre, and Salesches use the same arms.)

== Notable people ==
- Marcel Gromaire

== See also ==
- Communes of the Nord department
