= Bouvignies =

- Commune
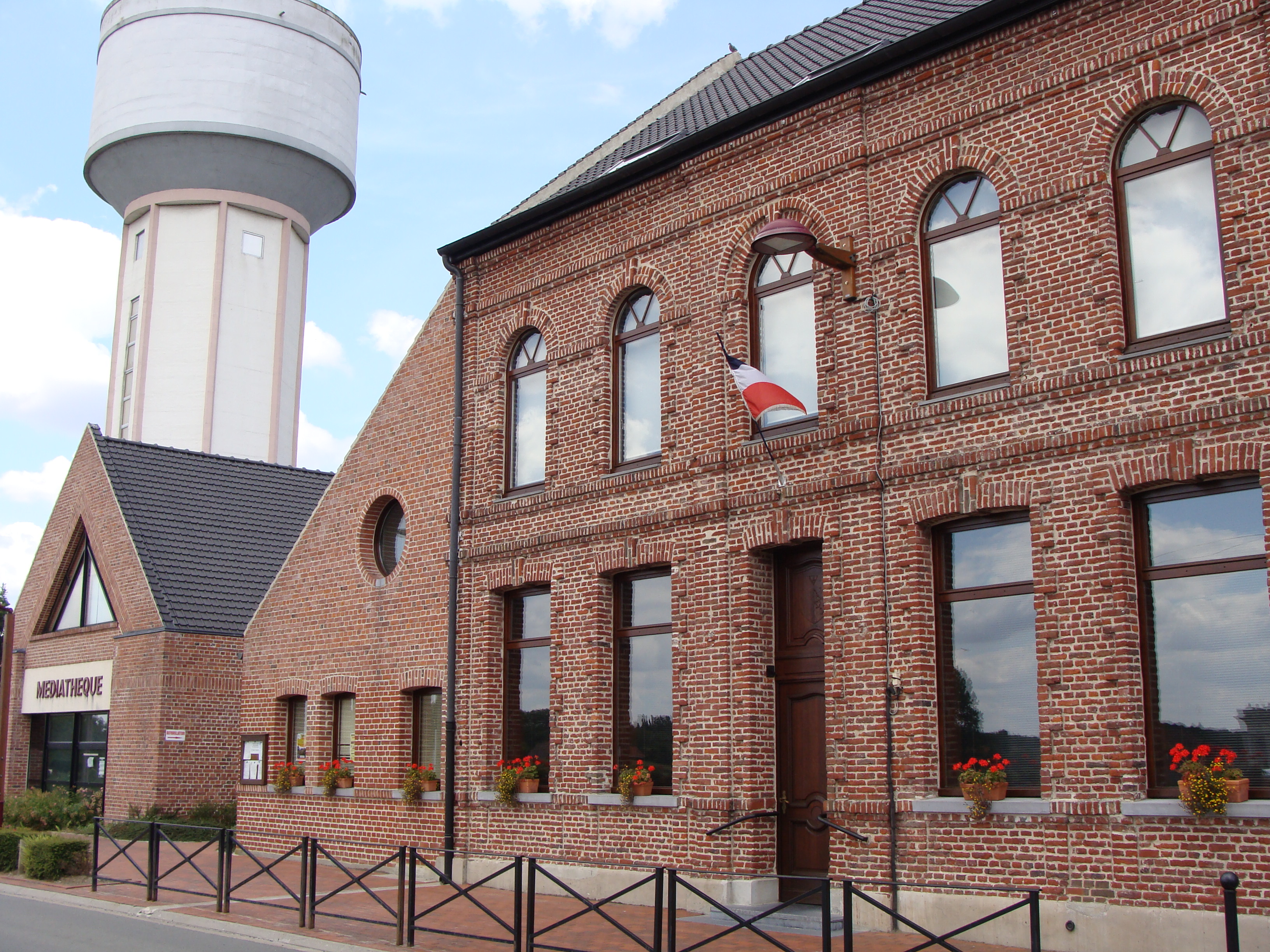
- The town hall in Bouvignies

- Coat of arms
- Location of Bouvignies
- Location within France Location within Hauts-de-France
- Coordinates: 50°26′12″N 3°14′46″E
- Country: France
- Region: Hauts-de-France
- Department: Nord
- Arrondissement: Douai
- Canton: Orchies
- Intercommunality: Pévèle-Carembault

Government
  - Mayor (2020–2026): Fréderic Pradalier
- Area^{1}: 8.7 km^{2} (3.4 sq mi)
- Elevation: 32 m (105 ft)
- Highest elevation: 30 m (98 ft)
- Lowest elevation: 16 m (52 ft)
- Population (2023): 1,580
  - Density: 180/km^{2} (470/sq mi)
- Time zone: UTC+01:00 (CET)
  - Summer (DST): UTC+02:00 (CEST)
- INSEE/Postal code: 59105 /59870
- ^{1} French Land Register data, which excludes lakes, ponds, glaciers > 1 km^{2} (0.386 sq mi or 247 acres) and river estuaries.

Bouvignies (French pronunciation: [buviɲi]) is a commune in the Nord department in northern France.

== Population ==
Historical population
Year	Pop.	±% p.a.
1968	1,114	—
1975	1,128	+0.18%
1982	1,257	+1.56%
1990	1,426	+1.59%
1999	1,537	+0.84%
2007	1,513	−0.20%
2012	1,541	+0.37%
2017	1,535	−0.08%
2023	1,580	+0.48%
Source: INSEE

== Heraldry ==
Arms of Bouvignies	The arms of Bouvignies are blazoned : Azure, a bend argent. (Bouvignies, Jolimetz and Ochtezeele use the same arms.)

== See also ==
- Communes of the Nord department
