= Neuville-Saint-Rémy =

- Commune
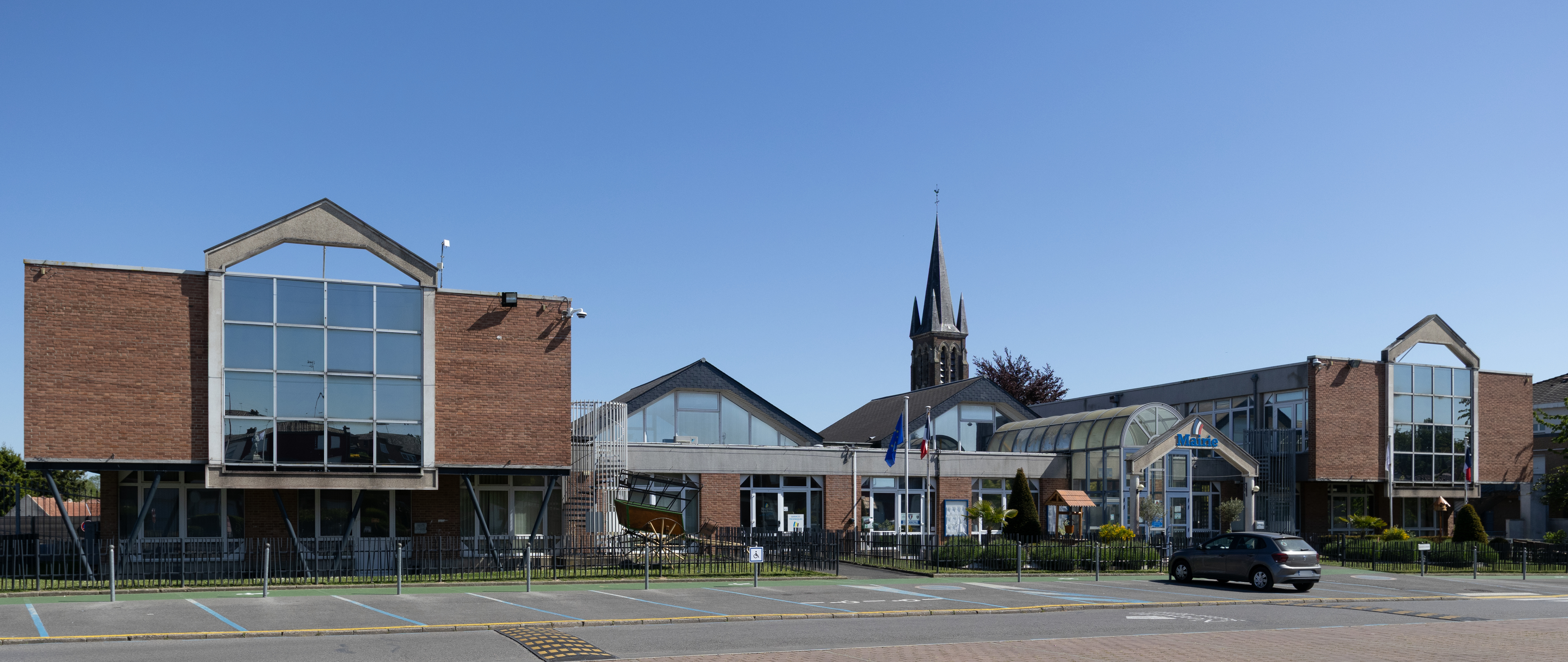
- The town hall in Neuville-Saint-Rémy

- Coat of arms
- Location of Neuville-Saint-Rémy
- Location within France Location within Hauts-de-France
- Coordinates: 50°11′18″N 3°13′23″E
- Country: France
- Region: Hauts-de-France
- Department: Nord
- Arrondissement: Cambrai
- Canton: Cambrai
- Intercommunality: CA Cambrai

Government
  - Mayor (2020–2026): Christian Dumont
- Area^{1}: 2.37 km^{2} (0.92 sq mi)
- Elevation: 60 m (200 ft)
- Highest elevation: 67 m (220 ft)
- Lowest elevation: 42 m (138 ft)
- Population (2023): 4,012
  - Density: 1,690/km^{2} (4,380/sq mi)
- Time zone: UTC+01:00 (CET)
  - Summer (DST): UTC+02:00 (CEST)
- INSEE/Postal code: 59428 /59554
- ^{1} French Land Register data, which excludes lakes, ponds, glaciers > 1 km^{2} (0.386 sq mi or 247 acres) and river estuaries.

Neuville-Saint-Rémy (French pronunciation: [nøvil sɛ̃ ʁemi]) is a commune in the Nord department in northern France.

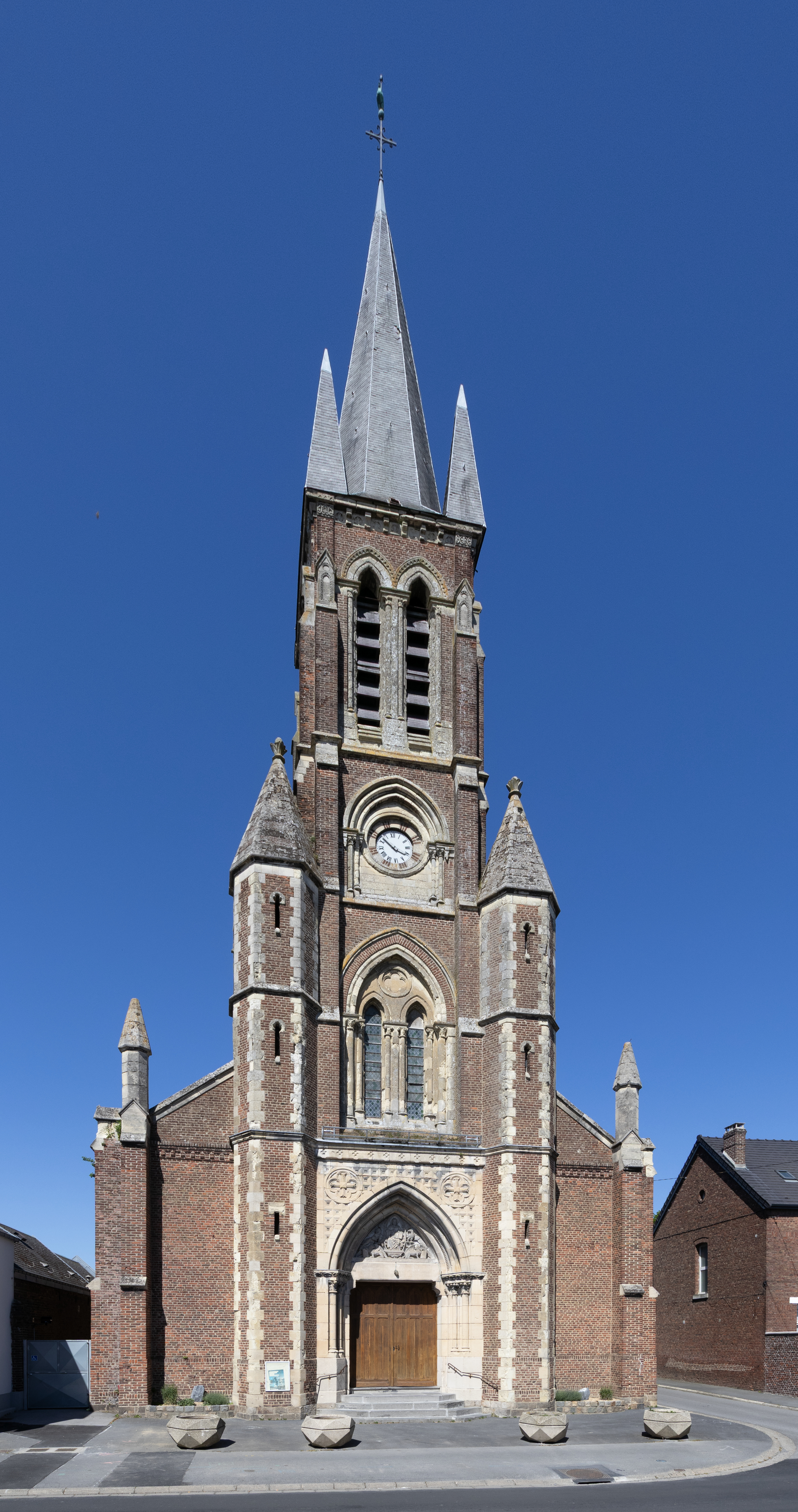
The church Saint-Rémi

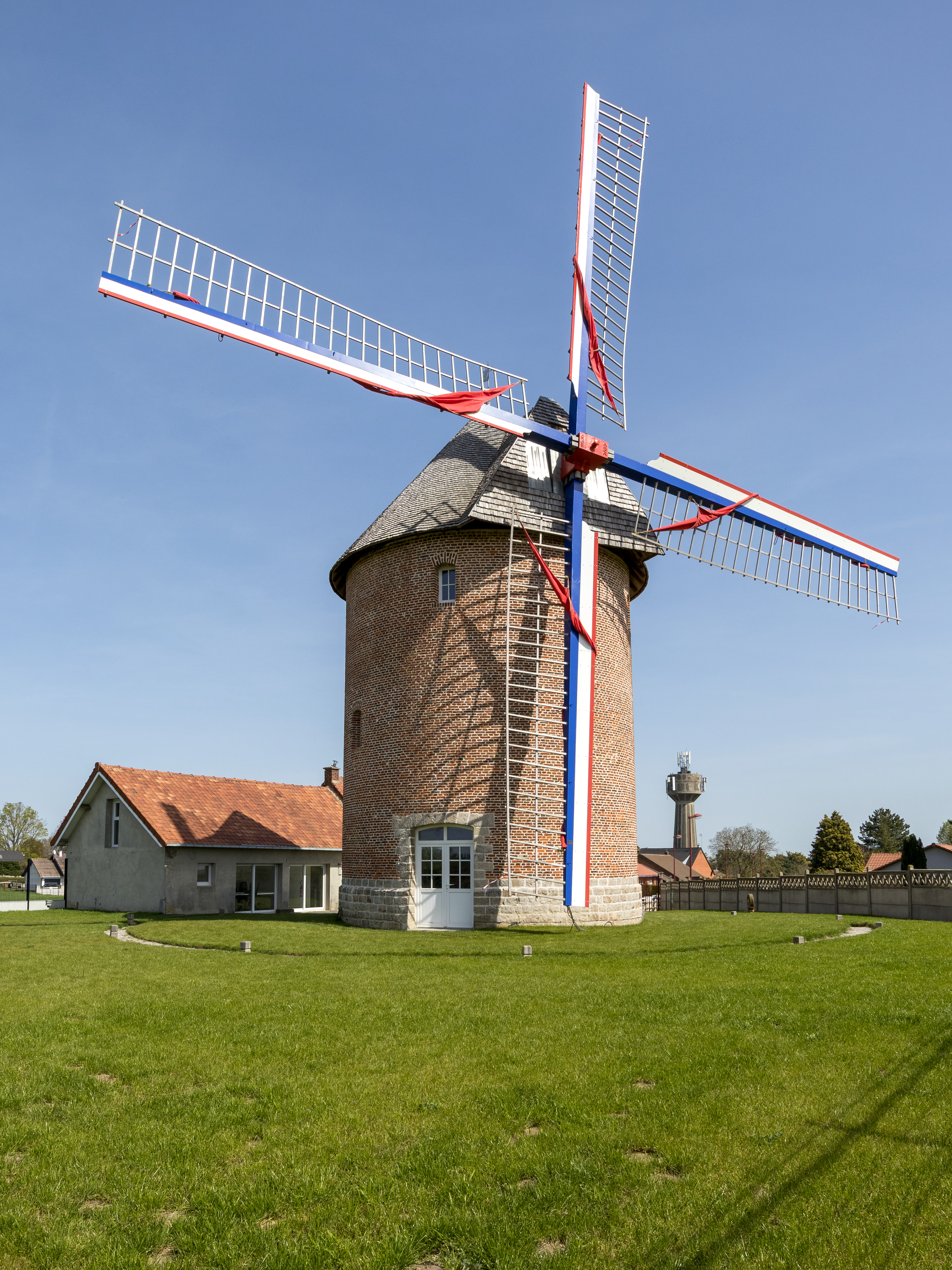
Mont-Farrand Mill

== Population ==
Historical population
Year	Pop.	±% p.a.
1968	4,127	—
1975	3,847	−1.00%
1982	4,107	+0.94%
1990	3,957	−0.46%
1999	3,962	+0.01%
2007	3,729	−0.75%
2012	3,810	+0.43%
2017	3,803	−0.04%
2023	4,012	+0.90%
Source: INSEE

== Heraldry ==
Arms of Neuville-Saint-Rémy	The arms of Neuville-Saint-Rémy are blazoned : Azure semy de lys Or, a stag argent. (Capelle, Loffre, Neuville-Saint-Rémy, Pecquencourt, and Vred use the same arms.)

== See also ==
- Communes of the Nord department
