= Battle of Albert (1914) =

Battle during the First World War

- Part of the Race to the Sea on the Western Front of the First World War
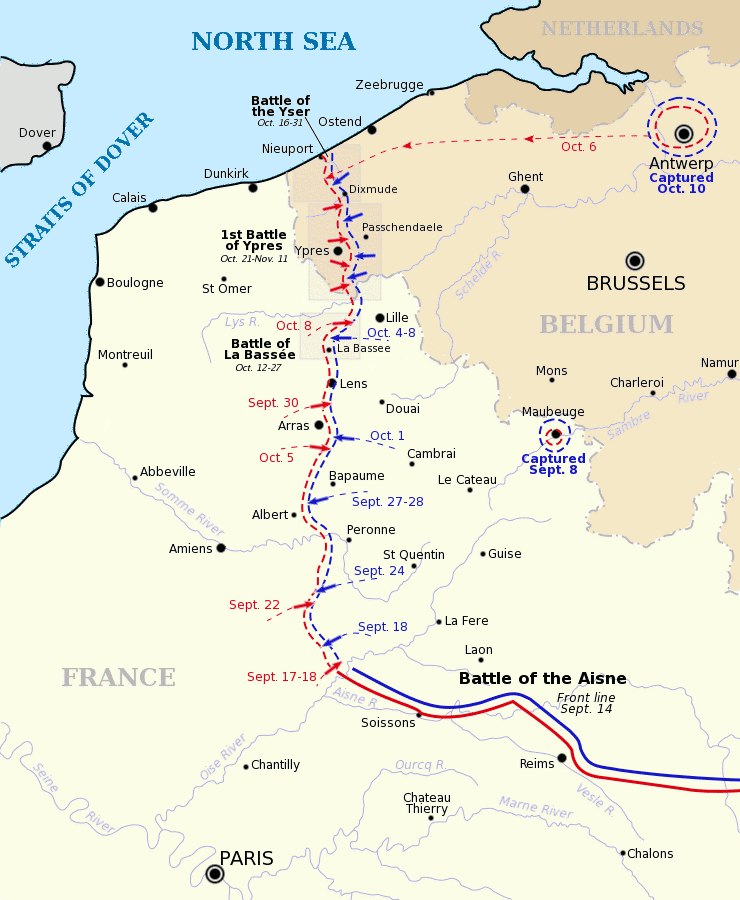
- Course of the Race to the Sea
| Date | 25–29 September 1914 (4 days) |
| Location | Somme, Picardy, France 50.01°N 2.69°E |
| Result | Inconclusive |

Belligerents
| France | German Empire |

Commanders and leaders
| (French Third Republic) Noël de Castelnau | (German Empire) Crown Prince Rupprecht |

Strength
| Second Army | 6th Army |

The Battle of Albert (also known as the First Battle of Albert) began on 25 September 1914, in what became known as the "Race to the Sea", during the First World War. It followed the First Battle of the Aisne as both sides moved northwards, trying to turn the northern flank of their opponent. The Second Army (Noël de Castelnau), began to assemble at Amiens in mid-September and was directed by General Joseph Joffre, the Generalissimo of the French Army, to attack near Albert.

On 25 September, the Second Army advanced eastwards but instead of advancing round an open northern flank, encountered the German 6th Army attacking in the opposite direction, reaching Bapaume on 26 September and Thiepval the next day. The Germans had intended to outflank the French and drive westwards to the English Channel, seizing the industrial and agricultural regions of northern France and isolating Belgium. Neither side could defeat their opponent and the battle ended in stalemate around 29 September, as both sides made another outflanking attempt to the north of Albert, at the Battle of Arras (1–4 October).

== Background ==
=== Battle of the Frontiers ===
On 18 August, General Albert d'Amade formed a defence line from Maubeuge to Dunkirk, to prevent the disruption of railways by German cavalry raids. The Scarpe, Escaut and Rhonelle sluices were opened to extend the floods of the Scarpe and the old forts of de Maulde, Flines, Curgies, Condé and Le Quesnoy around Valenciennes were re-occupied. On 20 August, d'Amade formed a line of three territorial divisions de campagne, with the 84th Territorial Division from the Scarpe to the Sambre, the 82nd Territorial Division from the Sambre to the Lys and the 81st Territorial Division from the Lys to the sea. When the BEF advanced to the west of Maubeuge, the 84th Territorial Division advanced to Condé and formed a new defensive line along the Escaut, from Condé to Maulde. On 23 August, the 88th Territorial Division arrived near Lille from Paris, with orders to recapture Tournai. The division was bombarded by heavy artillery when close to Cysoing the next morning and slowly retired to Templeuve and Arras. After the Battle of Charleroi (21 August) and the Battle of Mons (23 August), Amiens became vulnerable to the advance of the 1st Army as it pursued the British Expeditionary Force (BEF) and the Fifth Army. At 2:00 a.m. on 24 August, the Siege of Maubeuge began and the 84th Territorial Division fell back towards Cambrai and Marquion. The rearguard was attacked near Fresnes, just south of Condé and next day, the division was engaged near Haspres and defeated.

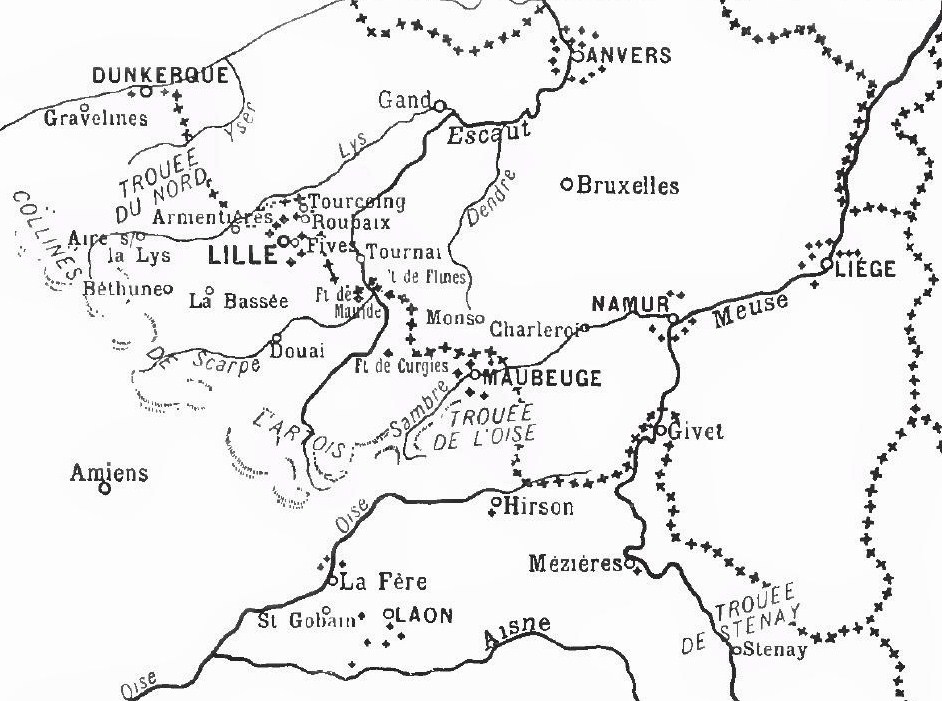
French-Belgian frontier zone, 1914

Orders came from Paris to abandon Lille, which was evacuated on 24 August and the 82nd Territorial Division formed a line from La Bassée to Corbehem, with the 81st Territorial Division forming a line from Aire to the sea. The Sixth Group of Reserve Divisions (also known as Groupe Ebener, with the 61st and 62nd Reserve divisions) were sent from Paris, increasing d'Amade's force to six divisions, to hold a 70 mi (110 km) line from Douai to Béthune and Aire, to the sea, with another 25,000 troops of the Lille garrison. On 25 August, the German II Corps advanced westwards through Denain, to get behind the left flank of the BEF and after dark reached the vicinity of Cambrai, where rearguards of the 84th Territorial Division defended the Sensée Canal at Bouchain, against a German attempt to cross. During 26 August, the division slowly retreated west of Cambrai; Groupe Ebener arrived at Marquion and were then ordered by Joffre to Combles and Péronne, to become part of the Sixth Army. The divisions retreated westwards, covered by the 84th Territorial Division, in actions which diverted part of the German II Corps from the BEF during the Battle of Le Cateau (26 August).

=== Action of Mesnil ===
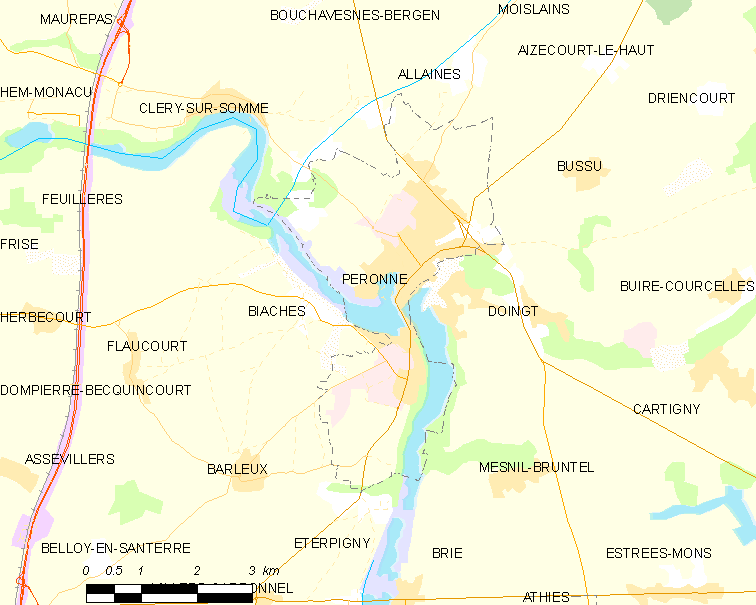
Map of Péronne and vicinity

Early on 28 August, the two reserve divisions advanced from Bapaume, taking the German II Cavalry Corps by surprise in its billets around Péronne. The action continued into the next day and the French divisions were then driven back from Manancourt, south-west of Bapaume, by elements of II Corps and the IV Reserve Corps. Further to the east, the French II Cavalry Corps, on the left of the BEF, failed to prevent the Germans from reaching the outskirts of Péronne on the evening of 27 August. The cavalry withdrew south of the Somme and next day Péronne was captured. The German advance continued towards Amiens and on 29 August, the Sixth Army counter-attacked the German advance guards, which had reached Bray-sur-Somme, Chuignolles and Framerville near Amiens. A Moroccan Chasseur brigade, the 14th Division of VII Corps, the 45th and 55th battalions of Chasseurs and the 55th Division on the right flank near Nesle, captured Proyart as the four Territorial divisions advanced on Amiens. During the evening, a German counter-attack retook Proyart and forced the French to the south. The Territorial divisions retreated from Amiens on 30 August, skirmishing with German patrols near Cagny. On 11 September, the German garrison withdrew from Amiens and next day the Territorial divisions arrived from Rouen and captured a few stragglers. The Territorial divisions advanced to the north-east towards Péronne and Fricourt on 17 September.

== Prelude ==
=== German offensive preparations ===
General Erich von Falkenhayn replaced Colonel-General Helmuth von Moltke the Younger as Chief of the German General Staff on 14 September, when the German front in France was being consolidated in Lorraine and on the Aisne. The open western flank beyond the 1st Army and the danger of attacks from the National redoubt of Belgium, where the Siege of Antwerp had begun on 20 August, created a dilemma. The German positions in France had to be maintained, when only offensive operations could lead to decisive victory. Appeals for the reinforcement of the Eastern Front could not be ignored and Falkenhayn cancelled a plan for the 6th Army to break through near Verdun. The army was sent to the right wing of the German armies, where the flank of 1st army was at Compiègne, beyond which there were no German forces until Antwerp. Falkenhayn could reinforce the 1st Army with the 6th Army, send it to Antwerp or divide the army by reinforcing the 1st Army and the Antwerp siege with part of the army, while the rest operated in the area between. Falkenhayn chose to move the 6th Army to Maubeuge and outflank the Franco-British left wing, withdrawing the 1st, 7th and 2nd armies to La Fère, Laon and Reims while the 6th Army was redeploying. The 3rd, 4th and 5th armies were to defend if the French attacked first and then attack to the south-west beginning on 18 September.

General Karl von Bülow, the 2nd Army commander and Colonel Gerhard Tappen of the Operations Branch of the Oberste Heeresleitung (OHL, Supreme Army Command) objected, because the time needed to move the 6th Army would concede the initiative to the French. Bülow and Tappen recommended an attack by the 1st and 7th armies, with reinforcements from the armies further to the east, for an offensive from Reims to Fismes and Soissons, since the French could redeploy troops on undamaged railways. The risk of separating the 1st and 2nd armies again would be avoided; Falkenhayn agreed and ordered the 6th Army to assemble at St Quentin. Attacks to encircle Verdun from the south and from Soissons to Reims would pin down French troops. On 21 September, Falkenhayn met Bülow and agreed that the 6th Army should concentrate close to Amiens, attack towards the Channel coast and then envelop the French south of the Somme, in a Schlachtentscheidung (decisive battle). The XXI Corps, which had moved from Lunéville on 15 September and the I Bavarian Corps which marched from Namur, arrived during 24 September but were diverted against the Second Army as soon as they arrived on 24 September, with orders to extend the front northwards from Chaulnes to Péronne, attack the French bridgehead and drive the French back over the Somme.

=== French preparations ===
French attempts to advance after the German retirement to the Aisne were frustrated after 14 September, when German troops were discovered to have stopped their rwithdrawal and dug in on the north bank of the Aisne. Joffre ordered attacks on the German 1st and 2nd armies but attempts by the Fifth, Ninth and Sixth armies to advance from 15 to 16 September had little success. The Deuxième Bureau (French Military Intelligence) reported German troop movements from east to west, which led Joffre to continue moving French troops from the east, which had begun on 2 September with IV Corps and continued on 9 September with XX Corps, 11 September with XIII Corps and XIV Corps on 18 September. The depletion of the French forces in the east, took place just before the Battle of Flirey (19 September – 11 October), a German offensive against the Third Army on either side of Verdun, the Fifth Army north of Reims and the Sixth Army along the Aisne, which ended with the creation of the St Mihiel Salient. Joffre maintained the French emphasis on the western flank, after receiving intercepted wireless messages, which showed that the Germans were moving an army to the western flank. Joffre continued to send units to the Second Army, north of the Sixth Army. On 24 September, the Second Army was attacked and found difficulty in holding ground, rather than advancing round the German flank as intended.

General Ferdinand Foch ordered the left flank of the French armies to move northward to Arras, Lens and Lille, to recreate a threat to the German northern flank, by moving through Arras to Cambrai and Le Cateau and from Lens to Valenciennes and Maubeuge. If the French occupied the area between Cambrai, Valenciennes, Maubeuge and Le Cateau, the German forces on the upper Somme, Oise and the Aisne would lose the use of the two main railways to Liege, although this would not be decisive, since the line from Laon to Vervins, Hirson, Charleroi, Namur and Liege and that from Laon to Mézières and Montmédy to either Luxemburg and Treves or Thionville and Metz, would still be available to the Germans. French moves to the north were also influenced by events in the siege of Antwerp, where Termonde fell on 26 September and increased the danger that the city and the Belgian army would be lost. The new Tenth Army was ordered to concentrate around Arras and Lens.

=== First Battle of Picardy ===
On 18 September, the Sixth Army advance was stopped on a south-east to north-west line at Carlepont on the south bank of the Oise and Noyon on the north bank, which ended the first French outflanking move. Joffre dissolved the Second Army in Lorraine and sent Castelnau and the Second Army headquarters to the north of the Sixth Army, to take over the IV and XIII corps, along with the 1st, 5th, 8th and 10th Cavalry divisions of the French II Cavalry Corps (General Louis Conneau) from the Sixth Army. The XIV Corps was transferred from the First Army and XX Corps from the original Second Army, to assemble south of Amiens, behind a screen of the 81st, 82nd, 84th and 88th Territorial divisions protecting French communications. The Second Army prepared to advance on 22 September, on a line from Lassigny northwards to Roye and Chaulnes, around the German flank. (Note: The German IX Reserve Corps had arrived from Belgium by 15 September and the 6th Army was expected to complete a move from Lorraine from 13 to 23 September.) Next day, the German II Corps joined the right flank of the 1st Army, for an attack to the south-west with the IV Corps, IX Reserve Corps and the 4th and 7th cavalry divisions. Bülow, ordered Kluck to cancel the offensive and withdraw the two corps behind the right flank of the 1st Army. On 16 September, the 2nd and 9th Cavalry divisions were dispatched from the Aisne front as reinforcements but before the retirement began, the French XIII and IV corps on the left flank of Sixth Army, with the 61st and 62nd divisions of the 6th Group of Reserve Divisions, began to advance along the Oise and met the right flank of the 1st Army between Carlepont and Noyon on 17 September. On the right flank, the French 17th and 45th divisions attacked near Soissons and gained a foothold on the plateau of Cuffies, just north of the city.

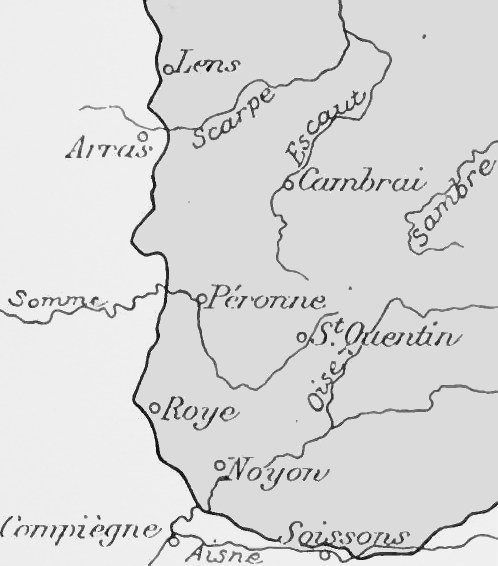
Outline of the Noyon Salient, formed from September–October 1914

The First Battle of Picardy (22–26 September 1914) was the first of the reciprocal outflanking attempts by the French and German armies after the First Battle of the Aisne (13 September – 28 September) and resulted in an encounter battle in Picardy. The French Sixth Army attacked up the Oise river valley towards Noyon, as the Second Army assembled further north, ready to advance round the northern flank of the German 1st Army. The Second Army crossed the Avre on a line from Lassigny northwards to Roye and Chaulnes but met the German II Corps from the 1st Army, that had arrived from the Aisne front, where new entrenchments had enabled fewer men to garrison the front line. The corps moved into line on the night of 18/19 September, on the right flank of the IX Reserve Corps. Despite the assistance of four divisions of the II Cavalry Corps (Lieutenant-General Georg von der Marwitz), the Germans were pushed back to a line from Ribécourt to Lassigny and Roye, which menaced German communications through Ham and St Quentin.

On 21 September, the German XVIII Corps had begun an 50 mi (80 km) forced march from Reims and reached Ham on the evening of 23 September. On 24 September, the corps attacked towards Roye and with II Corps, forced back the French IV Corps of the Sixth Army. To the north, the Second Army reached Péronne and formed a bridgehead on the east bank of the Somme, which exhausted the offensive capacity of the Second Army. Joffre sent the XI Corps, the last French reserve, to the Second Army and began to withdraw three more corps for dispatch to the Second Army. On 25 September, a German attack near Noyon pushed back the Second Army. French reinforcements attacked again and from 25 to 27 September, a general action took place along the Western Front from the Vosges to Péronne, after which the main effort of both sides took place further north.

== Battle ==
=== 25–29 September ===
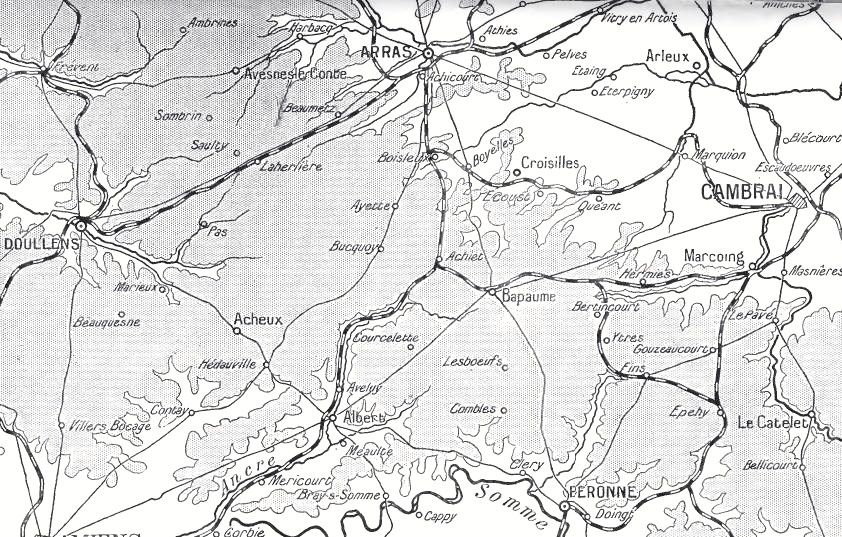
Terrain around Péronne, Albert and Arras

The offensive by the French Second Army forced Falkenhayn to divert the XXI Corps and the I Bavarian Corps as soon as they arrived, to extend the front northwards from Chaulnes to Péronne on 24 September and drive the French back over the Somme. Overcrowded and damaged railways behind the German front slowed the transit of German forces and infantry marched from Namur and Cambrai. On 25 September the German reinforcements attacked, crossed the Somme south of Péronne and then advanced to take a bridge between Hem and Feuillères. A French attack north of the Somme against the II Bavarian Corps, forced a hurried withdrawal. As more Bavarian units arrived in the north, the 3rd Bavarian Division advanced north of the Somme through Bouchavesnes, Leforest and Hardecourt until held up at Maricourt. The 4th Bavarian Division, further to the north, defeated the French Territorials and then attacked westwards towards Albert, through Sailly, Combles, Guillemont and Montauban. (Note: During the events at Péronne, the German 2nd, 7th and 1st armies attacked on the Aisne, to prevent the French from withdrawing more troops for the operations on the Somme and towards Arras. Joffre ordered XI Corps to Amiens and next day, the French Second Army dug in on a line from Lassigny north to Roye and Bray-sur-Somme, as the German cavalry moved north to enable the II Bavarian Corps, from Valenciennes, to occupy the vacated ground north of the Somme.)

On 27 September, the II Cavalry Corps drove back the 61st and 62nd Reserve divisions (General Joseph Brugère, d'Amade had been replaced), to make way for the XIV Reserve Corps to link with the right flank of the II Bavarian Corps, ready for an attack towards Albert. The French subdivision d'Armée (General Louis de Maud'huy) began to assemble at Arras and de Maud'huy found that instead of making another attempt to get round the German flank, the subdivision was menaced by a German offensive. The II Bavarian and XIV Reserve corps pushed back a French Territorial division from the area around Bapaume and advanced towards Bray-sur-Somme and Albert, as part of the offensive down the Somme valley to reach the sea. The German offensive was confronted north of the Somme by the French XXI Corps, X Corps and the 81st, 82nd, 84th and 88th Territorial divisions (Brugère) further north and the 1st, 3rd, 5th and 10th Cavalry divisions of the II Cavalry Corps (General Louis Conneau), east of Albert.

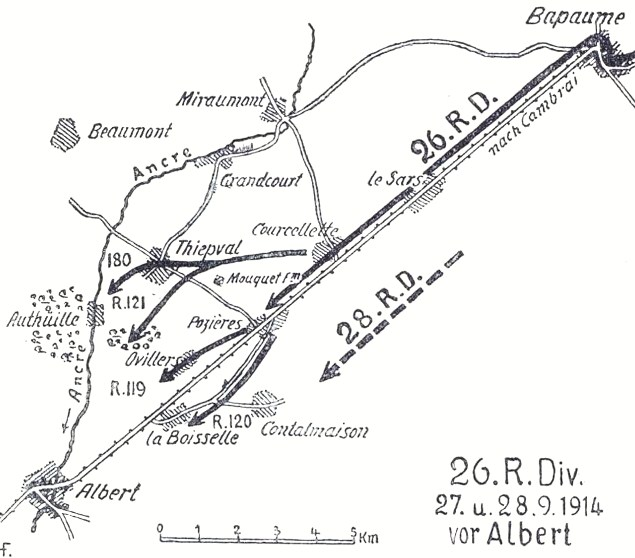
Diagram of the 26th (Württemberg) Reserve Division and the 28th (Baden) Reserve Division attacks towards Albert, late September 1914

The XIV Reserve Corps attacked on 28 September, along the Roman road from Bapaume to Albert and Amiens, intending to reach the Ancre and then continue westwards along the Somme valley. The 28th Reserve Division advanced close to Fricourt, against scattered resistance from French infantry and cavalry. On 28 September, the French were able to stop the German advance, on a line from Maricourt to Fricourt and Thiépval. The German II Cavalry Corps, moved north but was held up near Arras, by the French II Cavalry Corps. On 29 September, the 28th Reserve Division attacked Fricourt and captured the village but was prevented by French small-arms and artillery-fire, from advancing beyond. North of the road, the 26th Reserve Division advance was also stopped by the French. Next day French units counter-attacked several times and almost recaptured Fricourt.

A lull in the fighting occurred overnight and then both sides began to dig in haphazardly, where the opposing lines had stopped moving, which was not always on easily defended ground. At Maricourt, about 3.1 mi (5 km) to the south, the German advance had been stopped short of the village. North of the road, the 26th Reserve Division fought to capture the high ground of Bazentin Ridge, which overlooked the Ancre valley but instead of rolling up the French northern flank, was endangered by a reciprocal French attack. (The French attack reached Sapignies behind the right flank, until counter-attacked by the Guards Corps, which arrived at Bapaume on 2 October.) Joffre added X Corps, 32 km (20 mi) north of Amiens, the II Cavalry Corps, south-east of Arras and a provisional corps under General Victor d'Urbal, which had the 77th Reserve Division south-east of Arras and the 70th Reserve Division in Lens, to the subdivision which was renamed the Tenth Army, to make another outflanking move near Arras.

== Aftermath ==
=== Analysis ===
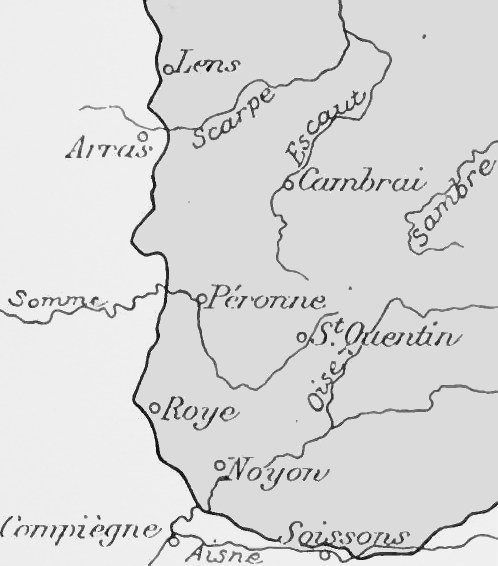
Outline of the Noyon Salient, formed from September to October 1914

The French had been able to use the undamaged railways behind their front to move troops more quickly than the Germans, who had to take long detours, wait for repairs to damaged tracks and replace rolling stock. The French IV Corps moved from Lorraine on 2 September in 109 trains and assembled by 6 September. The French had been able to move troops in up to 200 trains per day and use hundreds of motor-vehicles, co-ordinated by two staff officers, Commandant Gérard and Captain Doumenc. The French could also use Belgian and captured German rail wagons and the domestic telephone and telegraph systems. The initiative held by the Germans in August was not recovered and the troop movements to the right flank were piecemeal.

Until the end of the Siege of Maubeuge (24 August – 7 September), only the single line from Trier to Liège, Brussels, Valenciennes and Cambrai was available and had to be used to supply the German armies on the right as the 6th Army travelled in the opposite direction, limiting the army to forty trains a day, taking four days to move a corps. Information on German troop movements from wireless interception enabled the French to forestall German moves but the Germans had to rely on reports from spies, which were frequently wrong. The French resorted to more cautious infantry tactics, using cover to reduce casualties and a centralised system of control as the German army commanders followed contradictory plans. The French did not need quickly to obtain a decisive result and could concentrate on conserving the French army.

=== Subsequent operations ===
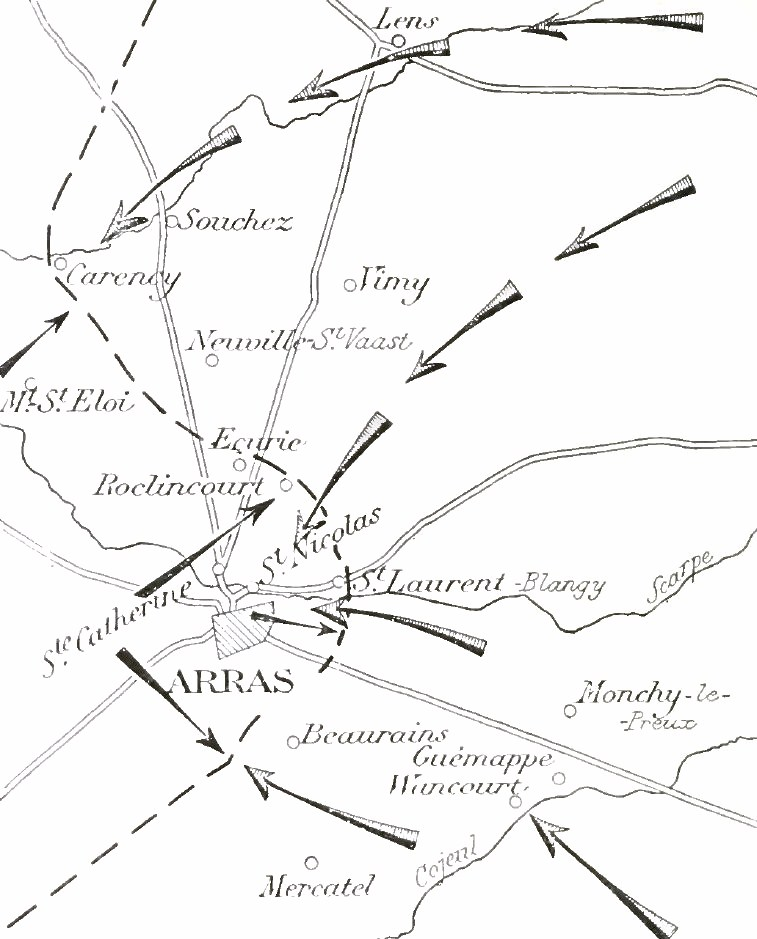
Attacks on Arras, October 1914

On 30 September, a French division arrived at Arras and on 1 October was slowly pushed back from Guémappe, Wancourt and Monchy-le-Preux until the arrival of X Corps. Two more French corps, three infantry and two cavalry divisions had been sent northwards to Amiens, Arras, Lens and Lille, which increased the Second Army to eight corps, along a front of 100 km (62 mi). On 28 September, Falkenhayn had ordered the 6th Army to conduct an offensive on the existing northern flank by the IV, Guard and I Bavarian corps near Arras and offensives further north. (Note: I Cavalry Corps with the Guard and 4th Cavalry divisions, II Cavalry Corps with the 2nd, 7th and 9th Cavalry divisions and the IV Cavalry Corps of the 3rd, 6th and Bavarian Cavalry divisions.) On 1 October, the French attacked to the south-east, expecting only a cavalry screen.

Three German corps attacked from Arras to Douai on 1 October, forestalling the French. From 3 to 4 October, costly German attacks were made on Beaurains, Mercatel and the Arras suburbs of St Laurent-Blangy and St Nicolas, which were repulsed and Lens fell. German attacks were made from the north of Arras to reach the Scarpe but were eventually repulsed by the X Corps. By 4 October, German troops had also reached Givenchy-en-Gohelle and on the right flank of the French to the south, several Territorial divisions were separated from X Corps. Joffre made Maud'huy's subdivision d'armée independent as the Tenth Army and told Castelnau to keep the Second Army in position, to wait while the increasing number of troops further north diverted German pressure.

By 6 October, the Second Army front from the Oise to the Somme and the Tenth Army front from Thiepval to Gommecourt, Blaireville, the eastern fringe of Arras, Bailleul, Vimy and Souchez had been stabilised. The operation by the cavalry under Marwitz to the north of the 6th Army, had pushed back the French Territorial divisions to a line between Lens and Lille and on 5 October, Marwitz issued orders for the cavalry to advance westwards to Abbeville on the Channel coast and cut the railways leading south. At the end of 6 October, Falkenhayn terminated attempts by the 2nd Army to break through in Picardy. To the north, the I and II Cavalry corps attacked between Lens and Lille, were quickly repulsed and forced back behind the Lorette Spur. Next day the cavalry was attacked by the first troops of the French XXI Corps, advancing from Béthune.
