= Ouvrage Eth =

- Part of Maginot Line New Fronts
- Northern France

Site information
- Controlled by: France

Location
- Coordinates: 50.31784°N 3.65608°E

Site history
- Materials: Concrete, steel, deep excavation
- Battles/wars: Battle of France

Ouvrage Eth is an isolated petit ouvrage of the Maginot Line, built as part of the "New Fronts" program to address shortcomings in the Line's coverage of the border with Belgium. It is located between the villages of Eth and Wargnies-le-Grand, in Nord département. Eth is the sole Maginot fortification in the Fortified Sector of the Escaut, which primarily consisted of individual casemates, blockhouses and the improved 19th-century Fort de Maulde. During the Battle of France the ouvrage resisted artillery attack for four days before the garrison evacuated through a drain to a neighboring casemate.

== Design and construction ==
The site was approved in 1934. Work cost 7.58 million francs.

== Description ==
Eth comprises two combat blocks 250 metres (820 ft) apart, one of which had a new mixed-arms turret mounting a JM machine gun and a 25mm gun. (Note: English-language sources use the French term ouvrage as the preferred term for the Maginot positions, in preference to "fort", a term usually reserved for older fortifications with passive defenses in the form of walls and ditches, although in this case ouvrage also applies to a lesser fortification with a small garrison. The literal translation of ouvrage in the sense of a fortification in English is "work." A Maginot gros ouvrage is a large fortification with a significant artillery component, while a petit ouvrage is smaller, with lighter arms.) An underground gallery connects the two blocks, with underground service and barracks spaces along the short gallery. The nearby Casemate Jenlain is linked to Eth by 600 metres (2,000 ft) of drain large enough for personnel to traverse.

- Block 1: infantry/entry block with two automatic rifle cloches (GFM-B), one mixed-arms cloche (AM), one automatic rifle embrasure and one and one machine gun/47mm anti-tank gun (JM/AC47) embrasure.
- Block 2: infantry/entrance block with one GFM cloche, one JM embrasure, one (JM/AC47) embrasure, one grenade launcher cloche (LG) and one retractable mixed arms AM/50mm mortar turret.

A second phase of work was planned to provide a third block with a twin 75mm gun turret, as well as much larger underground barracks and separate personnel and ammunition entrances about 600 metres (2,000 ft) away in the direction of Wargnies.

A number of small blockhouses are associated with Eth, as well as a casemate:

- Casemate de Jenlain: Single block with one JM/AC47 embrasure, one JM embrasure, two AM cloches and one GFM-B cloche. It is connected to the ouvrage as described above.

== Manning ==
The 1940 manning of the ouvrage under the command of Captain Dubos comprised 134 men and 5 officers of the 54th Fortress Infantry Regiment. The units were under the umbrella of the 1st Army, Army Group 1.

== History ==
See Fortified Sector of the Escaut for a broader discussion of the events of 1940 in the Escaut sector of the Maginot Line.

During the Battle of France in 1940, the invading German forces began to bombard Eth on 22 May. German 8.8 cm guns fired against Block 2 and the Casemate de Jenlain, causing significant damage. By the next day the positions were surrounded. Firing continued into the 26th, with Eth replying with what armament that remained operable. At 0345, rounds penetrated Block 2. At 0600 a German infantry assault was launched. Before the ouvrage could be taken, Captain Dobos organized an evacuation to the casemate through the drain, surprising the Germans when 160 men emerged from an embrasure in the casemate. Happily for the garrison, the Jenlain casemate had successfully dispersed an 8.8 cm gun crew that had been firing on the casemate on the 23rd, and had not regained their piece on the 26th. Combat ceased at 1020 hours

== Current ==
Eth is privately owned and is not accessible to the public. It is reported to be in poor condition.

== See also ==
- List of all works on Maginot Line
- Siegfried Line
- Atlantic Wall
- Czechoslovak border fortifications

== Bibliography ==
- Allcorn, William. The Maginot Line 1928-45. Oxford: Osprey Publishing, 2003. ISBN 1-84176-646-1
- Kaufmann, J.E. and Kaufmann, H.W. Fortress France: The Maginot Line and French Defenses in World War II, Stackpole Books, 2006. ISBN 0-275-98345-5
- Kaufmann, J.E., Kaufmann, H.W., Jancovič-Potočnik, A. and Lang, P. The Maginot Line: History and Guide, Pen and Sword, 2011. ISBN 978-1-84884-068-3
- Mary, Jean-Yves; Hohnadel, Alain; Sicard, Jacques. Hommes et Ouvrages de la Ligne Maginot, Tome 1. Paris, Histoire & Collections, 2001. ISBN 2-908182-88-2 (in French)
- Mary, Jean-Yves; Hohnadel, Alain; Sicard, Jacques. Hommes et Ouvrages de la Ligne Maginot, Tome 2. Paris, Histoire & Collections, 2003. ISBN 2-908182-97-1 (in French)
- Mary, Jean-Yves; Hohnadel, Alain; Sicard, Jacques. Hommes et Ouvrages de la Ligne Maginot, Tome 3. Paris, Histoire & Collections, 2003. ISBN 2-913903-88-6 (in French)
- Mary, Jean-Yves; Hohnadel, Alain; Sicard, Jacques. Hommes et Ouvrages de la Ligne Maginot, Tome 5. Paris, Histoire & Collections, 2009. ISBN 978-2-35250-127-5 (in French)
