= Fortified Sector of Lille =

The Fortified Sector of Lille (Secteur Fortifié de Lille) was the French military organization that in 1940 controlled the section of the French border with Belgium opposite Lille. The sector was part of a system of fortifications that included the Maginot Line in other sectors. In the case of the Lille sector, no large fortifications of the kind typified by the Maginot Line were built in the area. Fortifications were confined to a total of 65 blockhouses and 23 infantry shelters within a few kilometers of the border, mainly between Roubaix and Tourcoing and the border. The Fortified Sector of Lille was bordered on the east by the Fortified Sector of the Escaut and on the west by the Fortified Sector of Flanders. The sector figured in the Pillbox affair of 1939-40. It was quickly overrun by German forces during the Battle of France.

== Command ==
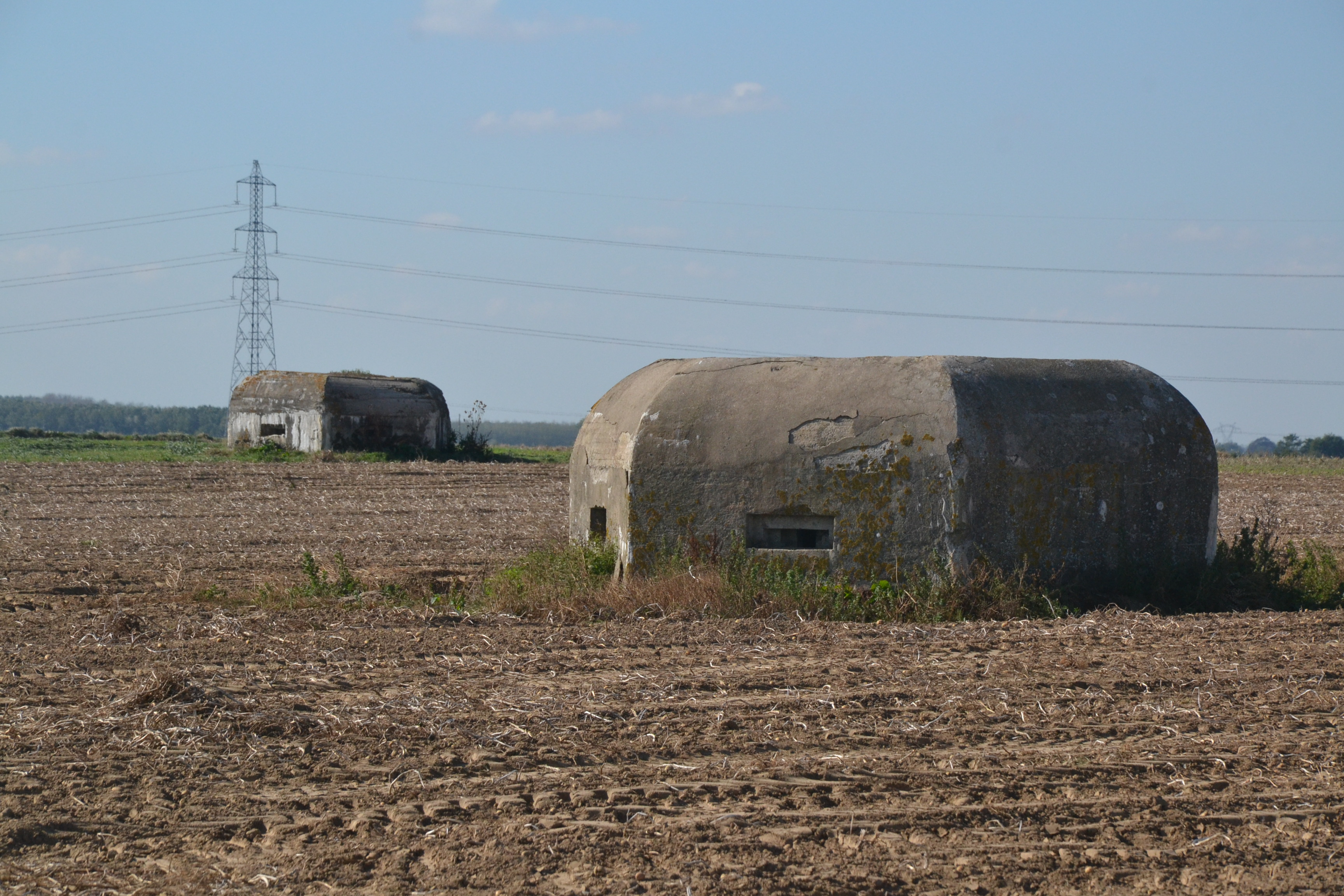
Casemates near Cysoing

In 1940 the Lille sector was under the overall command of the British Expeditionary Force, under the command of General Gort, which was in turn part of Army Group 1 under General Gaston Billotte. The sector was commanded by French general Bertschi. Until 16 March 1940 the sector was known as the Defensive Sector of Lille (Secteur Défensif de Lille).

== Concept and organization ==
Unlike the Maginot fortifications, the Lille sector fortifications were comparatively light structures built close to the frontier. Most were built in the 1930s. A total of 65 blockhouses of eleven types were built, 23 infantry firing shelters (abris de tir) of four types, and nine turrets using small armored vehicle turrets and weapons. As many as 700 light blockhouses existed in all, many built by the British Expeditionary Force or adapted from German World War I positions. Other positions were built by the Main d'Oeuvre Militaire (MOM), Section Technique du Génie (STG) or the Fortifications de Campagne Renforcées (FCR).

== Bibliography ==
- Allcorn, William. The Maginot Line 1928-45. Oxford: Osprey Publishing, 2003. ISBN 1-84176-646-1
- Kaufmann, J.E. and Kaufmann, H.W. Fortress France: The Maginot Line and French Defenses in World War II, Stackpole Books, 2006. ISBN 0-275-98345-5
- Kaufmann, J.E., Kaufmann, H.W., Jancovič-Potočnik, A. and Lang, P. The Maginot Line: History and Guide, Pen and Sword, 2011. ISBN 978-1-84884-068-3
- Mary, Jean-Yves; Hohnadel, Alain; Sicard, Jacques. Hommes et Ouvrages de la Ligne Maginot, Tome 1. Paris, Histoire & Collections, 2001. ISBN 2-908182-88-2 (in French)
- Mary, Jean-Yves; Hohnadel, Alain; Sicard, Jacques. Hommes et Ouvrages de la Ligne Maginot, Tome 3. Paris, Histoire & Collections, 2003. ISBN 2-913903-88-6 (in French)
- Mary, Jean-Yves; Hohnadel, Alain; Sicard, Jacques. Hommes et Ouvrages de la Ligne Maginot, Tome 5. Paris, Histoire & Collections, 2009. ISBN 978-2-35250-127-5 (in French)
- Romanych, Marc; Rupp, Martin. Maginot Line 1940: Battles on the French Frontier. Oxford: Osprey Publishing, 2010. ISBN 1-84176-646-1
