= Fortified Sector of the Escaut =

The Fortified Sector of the Escaut (Secteur Fortifié de l'Escaut), also known as the Fortified Sector of the Schelde, was the French military organization that in 1940 controlled the section of the Maginot Line between the French border with Belgium and Valenciennes, a distance of about 30 kilometres (19 mi). Named for the Escaut River (more commonly known as the Schelde), the Maginot line in the Escaut sector consists of a single position, the petit ouvrage Eth, together with its supporting casemate Jeanlain, as well as an upgraded fort of the Séré de Rivières system, the Fort de Maulde. The remainder of the sector's fortifications consist of blockhouses and casemates arranged along a line of principal resistance about 2 kilometres (1.2 mi) behind the frontier, with a second line on the edge of the Raismes Forest. The Escaut sector and the Fortified Sector of Maubeuge were the final sections of the Maginot line to be authorized, and were termed the "New Fronts." The Escaut sector was attacked during the Battle of France in late May 1940, resisting for a few days.

== Concept and organization ==
Initial work in the sector established a series of casemates in the Raismes Forest, between Valenciennes and the Belgian border. The casemates were built by the Commission d'Organisation des Régions Fortifiées (CORF), the Maginot Line's design and construction agency. As the fortification of the Escaut Front was commenced later than the main section of the Line to the east, funds were restricted by the impact of the Great Depression, which had reached France. The plan was also affected by political considerations, in which the fortification of the Belgian frontier was seen as a betrayal of the French plan for forward defense on Belgian territory. Most of the Escaut blockhouses built in 1936-37 were built under local initiatives to designs by the Army Engineering Service Section Technique du Génie (STG). The CORF lines in the Raismes Forest were augmented by lesser positions in the principal line of resistance constructed in 1936-37. In 1940 a few hasty fortifications were built to the rear of Valenciennes under the authority of the Study Commission for the Fortified Zones (Commission des Études des Zones Fortifiées (CEZF) ).

Ouvrage Eth is the sole Maginot fortification in the sector, two blocks linked by a deep underground gallery. A third block was planned but never completed, to be equipped with a 75mm gun turret, along with expanded support facilitates and a separate entrance block. A drainage tunnel of sufficient size for human passage linked Eth to the Casemate de Jeanlain, about 600 metres (2,000 ft) away to the west. The Fort de Maulde was improved under the auspices of STG, with a unique casemate for 155mm Fillioux field gun. Work was begun on an underground link between the observation post and the 75mm and 155mm casemates in 1939, but was never completed.

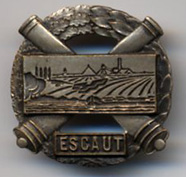
Insignia of the fortified sector.

== Command ==
The Escaut sector was under the overall command of the French 1st Army, under the command of General Blanchard, which was in turn part of Army Group 1 under General Gaston Billotte. The SF Escaut was commanded by General Echard, then General Béjard from May 1940.

== Description ==
The sector included, in order from west to east, the following major fortified positions, together with the most significant casemates and infantry shelters in each sub-sector: (Note: English-language sources use the French term ouvrage as the preferred term for the Maginot positions, in preference to "fort", a term usually reserved for older fortifications with passive defenses in the form of walls and ditches. The literal translation of ouvrage in the sense of a fortification in English is "work." A gros ouvrage is a large fortification with a significant artillery component, while a petit ouvrage is smaller, with lighter arms.)

54th Fortress Infantry Regiment (54e Régiment d'Infanterie de Forteresse (RIF)), Lt. Colonel Delcure

Raismes Forest Line (CORF) (108th CEO)

- Casemate de Notre-Dame d'Armour (1)
- Casemate du Cimitière-du-Mont-des-Bruyères (2)
- Casemate de Rosières (3)
- Casemate de Marlières (4)
- Casemate de l'Haute-Rive (5)
- Casemate de la Drève-dSaint-Antoine (6)
- Casemate du Lièvre Ouest (7)
- Casemate du Lièvre Est (8)
- Casemate de Trieux-d'Escaupont Ouest (9)
- Casemate de Trieux-d'Escaupont Est (10)
- Casemate du Cimitière-d'Escaupont Ouest (11)
- Casemate du Cimitière-d'Escaupont Est (12)

Resistance line (FCR/STG): 107th CEO

- Blockhaus du Sud-Ouest de Maulde 3
- Blockhaus du Sud-Ouest de Maulde 2
- Blockhaus du Sud-Ouest de Maulde 1
- Fort de Maulde
- Casemate de l'Ouest du Fort de Maulde
- Observatoire du Fort de Maulde
- Casemate de l'155 du Fort de Maulde
- Casemate de l'Est du Fort de Maulde
- Blockhaus du Sud de Maulde
- Blockhaus de la Trinquette
- Blockhaus du Mont-de-la-Justice
- Blockhaus de la Chapelle
- Abri du Pont-de-l'Imbécile
- Abri de Rodignies Ouest
- Blockhaus de Rodignies Est
- Blockhaus de la Château-l'Abbaye
- Blockhaus de l'Écluse-de-Rodignies
- Blockhaus du Petit-Marais
- Blockhaus de Long-Bruhot
- Abri de Bruille Sud
- Blockhaus de 'Église-de-Bruille
- Blockhaus de Bruille Nord
- Blockhaus de Bruille Sud
- Blockhaus de l'Écluse
- Blockhaus de Terril-de-la-Valresse
- Blockhaus de l'Ancienne Fosse Trouvez
- Blockhaus du Pont de l'Escaut
- Blockhaus de la Rue-de-la-Gare
- Blockhaus des Quatorze
- Blockhaus de la Chemin-de-Fer d'Onnaing
- Blockhaus de Rombies Nord
- Blockhaus de Rombies Sud
- Blochaus de la Chemin-de-la-Buse
- Blockhaus de Cyclamen
- Blockhaus du Rouge-Haie
- Blockhaus de l'Èpinette
- Blockhaus des Gobelins
- Casemate de Talandier
- Blockhaus de la Petite-Aunelle
- Blockhaus de la Fond-Delwarde
- Blockhaus de Mansard Ouest (Hortensia)
- Blockhaus de Mansard Est
- Blockhaus du Lys

106th CEO

- Casemate de Jeanlain
- Ouvrage Eth, petit ouvrage of two combat blocks, linked to Jeanlain
- Blockhaus de l'Aunelle
- Blockhaus de Wargnies-le-Petit
- Blockhaus de Wargnies (two blockhouses)
- Blockhaus de Noyer
- Blockhaus du Grand Condé (Muguet)
- Blockhaus de la Fosse-Cuvinot
- Blockhaus de la Noire-Voie
- Blockhaus d'Onnaing
- Blockhaus du Cimitière-d'Onnaing
- Blockhaus de Quarouble
- Blockhaus du Grand-Val
- Blockhaus du Rouge-Haie
- Ouvrage d'Estreux, petit ouvrage, never built
- Blockhaus d'Estreux Nord
- Blockhaus d'Estreux Sud
- Blockhaus de la Calvaire-Saint-Druon
- Blockhaus de Bry
- Blockhaus du Stade-d'Onnaing
- Blockhaus de la Réservoir-d'Onnaing
- Blockhaus du Baraque-des-Chasseurs
- Blockhaus du Château-d'Estreux
- Blockhaus de la Ferme-du-Moulin
- Blockhaus du Cimitière-de-Curgies
- Blockhaus de la Chapelle-Saint-Roch

Second line in front of Valenciennes (FCR/STG)

- Blockhaus d'Estreux
- Blockhaus du Petit-Champ (Saultain)
- Blockhaus des Longues-Rayes
- Blockhaus du Cimitière-de-Saultain (Château-de-Saultain)
- Blockhaus de Sud de Curgies (Ferme-du-Château)
- Blockhaus du Champ-du-Pont-de-Curgies
- Blockhaus du Champ-des-Roseaux
- Blockhaus du Fort-de-Curgies
- Blockhaus de la Fond-des-Grands-Prés (Ouest de Jeanlain)
- Blockhaus du Chemin-de-Jeanlain (Est du Préseau)
- Blockhaus des Recoets
- Blockhaus de la Fabrique (La Sucrerie)
- Blockhaus des Quatre-Vents
- Blockhaus de la Flaque (Sud des Tourelles)

Second Position (CEZF) (1940)

- Blockhaus de Iwuy (Croix-Saint-Hubert)
- Blockhaus de Saint-Vaast
- Blockhaus de Saint-Hilaire
- Blockhaus de Qulévy
- Blockhaus du Fontaine-au-Tertre
- Blockhaus de la Ferme-des-Tilleuls

== History ==
=== Battle of France ===
Following the surrender or evacuation of the Fortified Sector of Maubeuge to the east, the German 253rd Infantry Division began to bombard the Fort de Maulde on 20 May 1940, reaching the fort with infantry on 23 May. Ouvrage Eth was bombarded starting 22 May, and invested by infantry and close-range artillery the next day. Pressure was increased on 26 May, when Block 2 of Eth was damaged by the German 28th Infantry Division's artillery and Maulde's peripheral casemates were captured. Captain Dobos of Eth moved his garrison by a connecting drainage tunnel to Casemate Jeanlain, but was forced to surrender there. The Casemate Talandier followed suit. The garrison at Maulde received orders to sabotage the position and evacuate, accomplishing this the night of 26–27 June. A German patrol the next day found the fort empty. The remaining blockhouses and casemates played no significant role in combat on the Escaut front as the Germans efficiently targeted gun embrasures in the relatively weak blockhouses.

The Germans stripped the Escaut fortifications during the Occupation, removing weapons for re-use and salvaging the massive steel cloches for scrap.

==== Units ====
The 54th Fortress Infantry Regiment spent much of 1939 and 1940 completing and extending the fortifications in the sector. First contact with the Germans was made on 17 May when two mobile companies of the 54th undertook the defense of the Escaut bridges between Valenciennes and Bouchain, holding until the 26th when they fell back towards Dunkerque. The bridges at Hergnies, Renaissance and Quiévrain were destroyed. The battalions assigned to fixed positions held until 25 June, when they too fell back to Dunkerque. The unit was evacuated during the Dunkirk evacuation to Plymouth, England.

The 54th RIF returned to France as part of the French 54th Infantry Regiment of the 43rd Infantry Division in the June 1944 Invasion of Normandy. Much of the unit was captured by German forces near Falaise on 17 June 1944.

== Present status ==
Both the Ouvrage d'Eth and the Fort de Maulde are abandoned. The Casemate du Cimitière-du-Mont-des-Bruyères has been open to visits by the public since 2009.

== See also ==
- Fortified Sector of Lille, a more lightly fortified border sector to the west

== Bibliography ==
- Allcorn, William. The Maginot Line 1928-45. Oxford: Osprey Publishing, 2003. ISBN 1-84176-646-1
- Kaufmann, J.E. and Kaufmann, H.W. Fortress France: The Maginot Line and French Defenses in World War II, Stackpole Books, 2006. ISBN 0-275-98345-5
- Kaufmann, J.E., Kaufmann, H.W., Jancovič-Potočnik, A. and Lang, P. The Maginot Line: History and Guide, Pen and Sword, 2011. ISBN 978-1-84884-068-3
- Mary, Jean-Yves; Hohnadel, Alain; Sicard, Jacques. Hommes et Ouvrages de la Ligne Maginot, Tome 1. Paris, Histoire & Collections, 2001. ISBN 2-908182-88-2 (in French)
- Mary, Jean-Yves; Hohnadel, Alain; Sicard, Jacques. Hommes et Ouvrages de la Ligne Maginot, Tome 3. Paris, Histoire & Collections, 2003. ISBN 2-913903-88-6 (in French)
- Mary, Jean-Yves; Hohnadel, Alain; Sicard, Jacques. Hommes et Ouvrages de la Ligne Maginot, Tome 5. Paris, Histoire & Collections, 2009. ISBN 978-2-35250-127-5 (in French)
- Romanych, Marc; Rupp, Martin. Maginot Line 1940: Battles on the French Frontier. Oxford: Osprey Publishing, 2010. ISBN 1-84176-646-1
