= Fortified Sector of Flanders =

The Fortified Sector of Flanders (Secteur Fortifié des Flandres) was the French military organization that in 1940 controlled the section of the French border with Belgium between Lille and the North Sea. The sector was part of a system of fortifications that, in other sectors, included the Maginot Line. In the case of the Flanders sector, no large fortifications of the kind typified by the Maginot Line were built in the area. Fortifications were confined to almost two hundred blockhouses built during the 1930s, and some defensive inundations in the vicinity of Dunkirk. The Fortified Sector of Flanders was bordered on the east by the Fortified Sector of Lille It was quickly overrun by German forces during the Battle of France.

== Concept and organization ==
Unlike the Maginot fortifications, the Flanders sector fortifications were comparatively light structures built close to the frontier. Most were built in the 1930s. About 200 blockhouse were built along the Belgian border. Scattered among the smaller blockhouses were more elaborate blockhouses termed "positions of resistance", designed either by local forces or by the Service Technique du Génie (STG), the French Army engineering corps. Most of the larger positions were built in 1939-40, but none approached the scale of Maginot fortifications.

A secondary line, running east–west and perpendicular to the frontier in the area, was termed the Cassel Belt (Bretelle de Cassel). It consisted of eight STG casemates, whose armament (a GFM cloche), was never installed.

== Command ==
In 1940 the Flanders sector was under the overall command of the French 7th Army, under the command of General Henri Giraud, which was in turn part of Army Group 1 under General Gaston Billotte. The sector was commanded by General Bathélémy. Until 20 January 1940 the sector was known as the Defensive Sector of Flanders (Secteur Défensif des Flandres).

== Bibliography ==
- Allcorn, William. The Maginot Line 1928-45. Oxford: Osprey Publishing, 2003. ISBN 1-84176-646-1
- Kaufmann, J.E. and Kaufmann, H.W. Fortress France: The Maginot Line and French Defenses in World War II, Stackpole Books, 2006. ISBN 0-275-98345-5
- Kaufmann, J.E., Kaufmann, H.W., Jancovič-Potočnik, A. and Lang, P. The Maginot Line: History and Guide, Pen and Sword, 2011. ISBN 978-1-84884-068-3
- Mary, Jean-Yves; Hohnadel, Alain; Sicard, Jacques. Hommes et Ouvrages de la Ligne Maginot, Tome 1. Paris, Histoire & Collections, 2001. ISBN 2-908182-88-2 (in French)
- Mary, Jean-Yves; Hohnadel, Alain; Sicard, Jacques. Hommes et Ouvrages de la Ligne Maginot, Tome 3. Paris, Histoire & Collections, 2003. ISBN 2-913903-88-6 (in French)
- Mary, Jean-Yves; Hohnadel, Alain; Sicard, Jacques. Hommes et Ouvrages de la Ligne Maginot, Tome 5. Paris, Histoire & Collections, 2009. ISBN 978-2-35250-127-5 (in French)
- Romanych, Marc; Rupp, Martin. Maginot Line 1940: Battles on the French Frontier. Oxford: Osprey Publishing, 2010. ISBN 1-84176-646-1
