= Hestrud =

- Commune
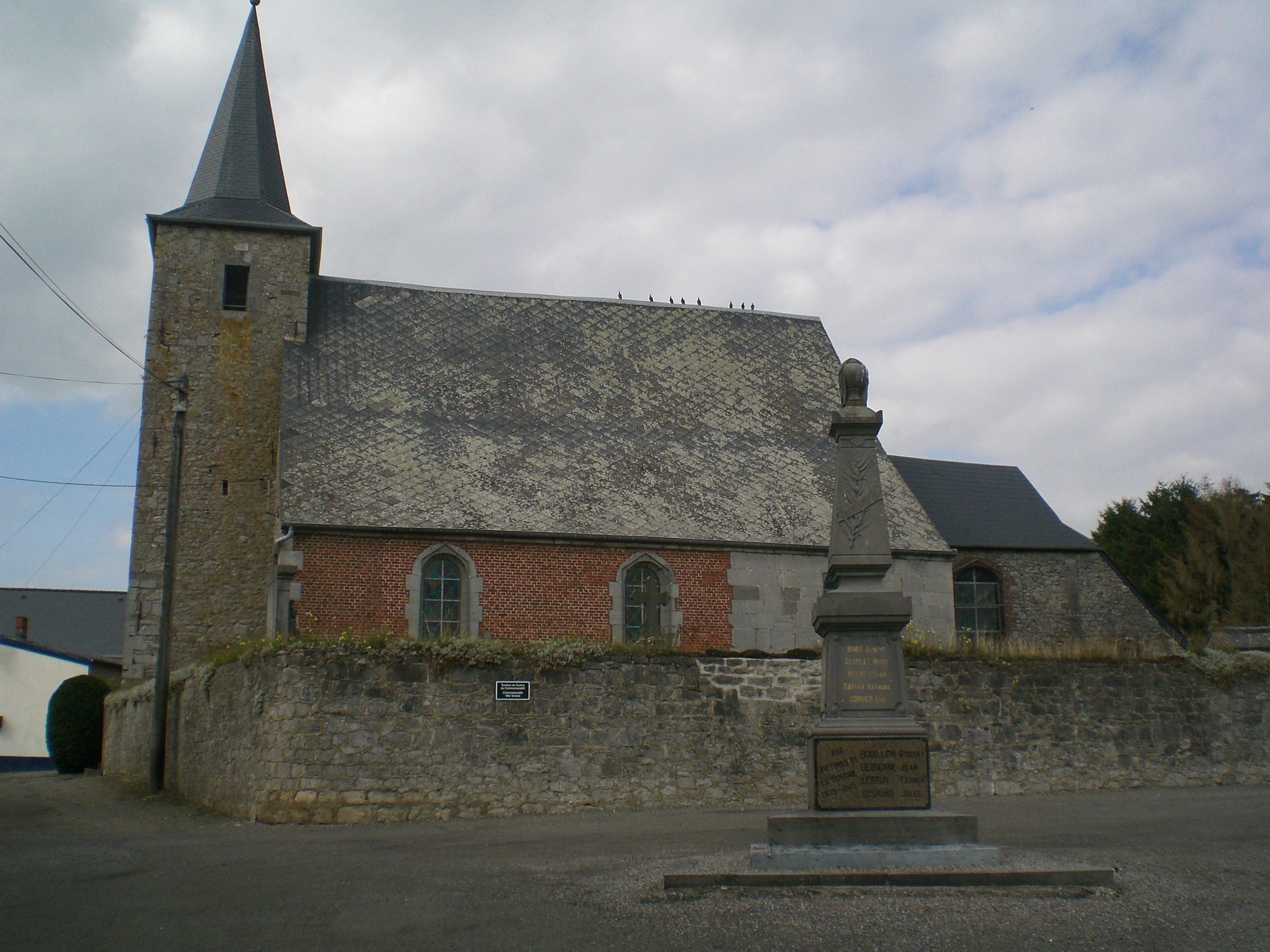
- The church in Hestrud

- Coat of arms
- Location of Hestrud
- Location within France Location within Hauts-de-France
- Coordinates: 50°12′00″N 4°09′08″E
- Country: France
- Region: Hauts-de-France
- Department: Nord
- Arrondissement: Avesnes-sur-Helpe
- Canton: Fourmies
- Intercommunality: CC Cœur de l'Avesnois

Government
  - Mayor (2020–2026): André Berteaux
- Area^{1}: 6.09 km^{2} (2.35 sq mi)
- Elevation: 177 m (581 ft)
- Highest elevation: 232 m (761 ft)
- Lowest elevation: 165 m (541 ft)
- Population (2023): 288
  - Density: 47.3/km^{2} (122/sq mi)
- Time zone: UTC+01:00 (CET)
  - Summer (DST): UTC+02:00 (CEST)
- INSEE/Postal code: 59306 /59740
- ^{1} French Land Register data, which excludes lakes, ponds, glaciers > 1 km^{2} (0.386 sq mi or 247 acres) and river estuaries.

Hestrud (French pronunciation: [ɛstʁyd]) is a commune in the Nord department in northern France.

== Heraldry ==
Arms of Hestrud	The arms of Hestrud are blazoned : Or, a bend gules. (Hestrud and Maulde use the same arms.)

== See also ==
- Communes of the Nord department
