= Fort de Maulde =

- Part of Maginot Line New Frontiers, Séré de Rivières system
- Maulde, France

Site information
- Type: Fort
- Controlled by: France
- Condition: Abandoned

Location
- Location within France
- Coordinates: 50.49526°N 3.42858°E

Site history
- Built: 1881–1884
- Built by: STG (1930s)
- Materials: Masonry, concrete
- Battles/wars: Battle of France

The Fort de Maulde, also known as Fort de Beurnonville and the Ensemble de Maulde, is located to the south of Maulde, France. It is part of the Fortified Sector of the Escaut, an extension of the Maginot Line. The Séré de Rivières system fort was built 1881–1884. In 1936–1937 the old fort, commanding high ground behind Maulde, was altered for more modern fortifications. It was evacuated by its garrison in 1940 during the Battle of France as part of the French retreat from the border with Belgium.

The site at the top of the Mont de Ligne dominates the plains of the Scarpe and the Escaut, occupying the site of an old military encampment used in 1792 by General Dumouriez against the Austrians. It is within 900 metres (3,000 ft) of the Belgian border. The fort is named for Pierre de Ruel, marquis de Beurnonville, a Marshal of France.

== Description ==
The original fort is typical of the Séré de Rivières system, with a low wall, surrounded by a ditch, which is in turn defended by two caponiers. The roof of the single-level barracks is concreted and supports an artillery platform, or cavalier. A relatively small fort, it was disarmed in 1912, then rearmed in 1914 with 90 mm guns.

In the 1930s the fort was chosen as a site for fortifications associated with the Maginot Line extension around Valenciennes, part of the "New Fronts" program. An observation post and two casemates were built in 1936–1937 within the walls of the fort. The casemates, facing east and west, were each furnished with two 75 mm guns and two automatic rifle ports. To the south, just outside the walls, a north-facing casemate for a 155 mm field gun was built, aligned to cover the bridges at Tournai. None of the casemates or the observatory were connected by underground passages in the manner of a fully developed Maginot fortification. A short distance to the north, a chain of casemates covered an anti-tank ditch extending about 2,000 metres (6,600 ft). The position is described as an "ensemble" rather than an ouvrage, as a true Maginot fortification would be termed, due to the absence of connecting underground galleries and support facilities. Nevertheless, with four 75 mm guns and a 155 mm gun, the position was heavily armed. Mauldet was not constructed by CORF (Commission d'Organisation des Régions Fortifiées), the Maginot Line's design and construction agency, but by the Army Engineer Service (Service Technique du Génie [STG]), further removing it from the main Maginot Line; five artillery casemates were planned but only three were built. In 1939 work was undertaken to link the observation post, 75 mm and 155 mm casemates by underground passages in a manner similar to Maginot works. The excavation was not completed before the outbreak of war in 1940.

=== Casemates and positions ===
The casemates are named for their relation to the town of Maulde, rather than to the fort.

- Casemate de 75 du Fort de Maulde Ouest: two 75 mm gun embrasures and two automatic rifle embrasures (inside the fort)
- Casemate de 75 du Fort de Maulde Est: two 75 mm gun embrasures and two automatic rifle embrasures (inside the fort)
- Observatiore du Fort de Maulde: two automatic rifle cloches (GFM-B) (inside the fort)
- Casemate du 155 du Fort de Maulde: one 155mm gun
- Blockhaus de Sud-Ouest de Maulde 1: one GFM-B cloche covering the anti-tank ditch
- Blockhaus de Sud-Ouest de Maulde 2: one GFM-B cloche covering the anti-tank ditch
- Blockhaus de Sud-Ouest de Maulde 3: double blockhouse with automatic rifle embrasures
- Blockhaus de Sud de Maulde 1: one GFM-B cloche covering the anti-tank ditch
- Blockhaus de la Trinquette: one GFM-B cloche covering the anti-tank ditch

== History ==
In 1870, France was partly occupied by the Prussian army. As a result of this defeat, the Séré de Rivières system of fortifications was planned and constructed to defend the nation. Valenciennes, located close by the border between France and Belgium, received additional fortifications. Construction on the Fort de Maulde started in 1881, completing in 1884 for a garrison of 431 men armed with 27 artillery pieces. In 1890 Valenciennes was declared an open city, and its Vauban-era fortifications in the city center were razed, while the new forts were disarmed. They were hastily rearmed in 1914, but were captured by the Germans in the opening stages of World War I. Before retreating in 1918 the Germans blew up the fort's powder magazine.

See Fortified Sector of the Escaut for a broader discussion of the Escaut sector of the Maginot Line.

In the 1930s, France invested in the construction of the Maginot Line, which covered the eastern frontiers of France. The frontier with Belgium was regarded as a lesser priority because France's war plan called for the French Army to advance into Belgium and conduct an offensive there. Belatedly, France began construction of a limited series of defenses around Valenciennes in the mid-1930s. These fortifications were individually assaulted and captured in the opening phases of World War II.

Following the fall of Maubeuge in May 1940, German forces advanced on Maulde, reaching the fort, commanded by Captain Schwengler, by 20 May. Bombardment began that day, but infantry units did not reach the area until the next day, delayed by fire from the 75 mm guns of the eastern casemate of Maulde. By 26 May, Maulde's peripheral casemates had been captured, and Schwengler was ordered to sabotage and evacuate the fort in the night. The Germans found the fort abandoned on 27 May.

After 1940, the Fort de Maulde was used by the Germans for explosives effects testing, leaving significant damage. After the war it became the property of a tile factory.

== Present condition ==
The Fort de Maulde was closed to public access in 2009, due to the dangers of falling into pits in the darkness of its interior and from falling masonry. Toxic waste from the tileworks was dumped in the fort until the 1980s. Its subsidiary bunkers remain visible in the surrounding fields.
