= Maulde =

- Commune
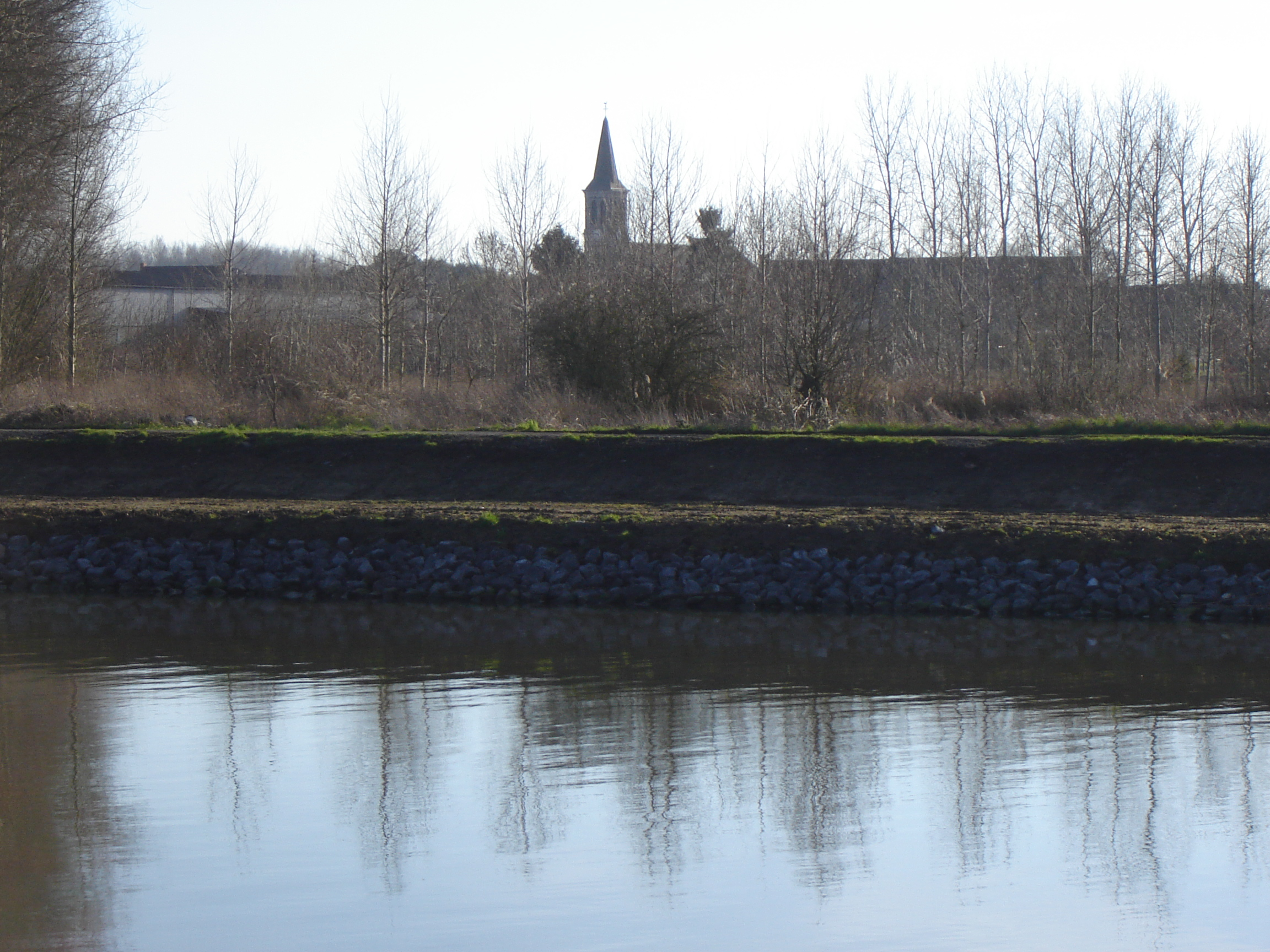
- A general view of the Escaut river in Maulde

- Coat of arms
- Location of Maulde
- Location within France Location within Hauts-de-France
- Coordinates: 50°30′11″N 3°26′41″E
- Country: France
- Region: Hauts-de-France
- Department: Nord
- Arrondissement: Valenciennes
- Canton: Saint-Amand-les-Eaux
- Intercommunality: CA Porte du Hainaut

Government
  - Mayor (2024–2026): Jean-François Hourdeau
- Area^{1}: 5.18 km^{2} (2.00 sq mi)
- Elevation: 18 m (59 ft)
- Highest elevation: 42 m (138 ft)
- Lowest elevation: 13 m (43 ft)
- Population (2023): 949
  - Density: 183/km^{2} (474/sq mi)
- Time zone: UTC+01:00 (CET)
  - Summer (DST): UTC+02:00 (CEST)
- INSEE/Postal code: 59393 /59158
- ^{1} French Land Register data, which excludes lakes, ponds, glaciers > 1 km^{2} (0.386 sq mi or 247 acres) and river estuaries.

Maulde (French pronunciation: [mold]) is a commune in the Nord department in northern France.

== Heraldry ==
Arms of Maulde	The arms of Maulde are blazoned : Or, a bend gules. (Hestrud and Maulde use the same arms.)

== See also ==
- Communes of the Nord department
