= Jeumont =

- Commune
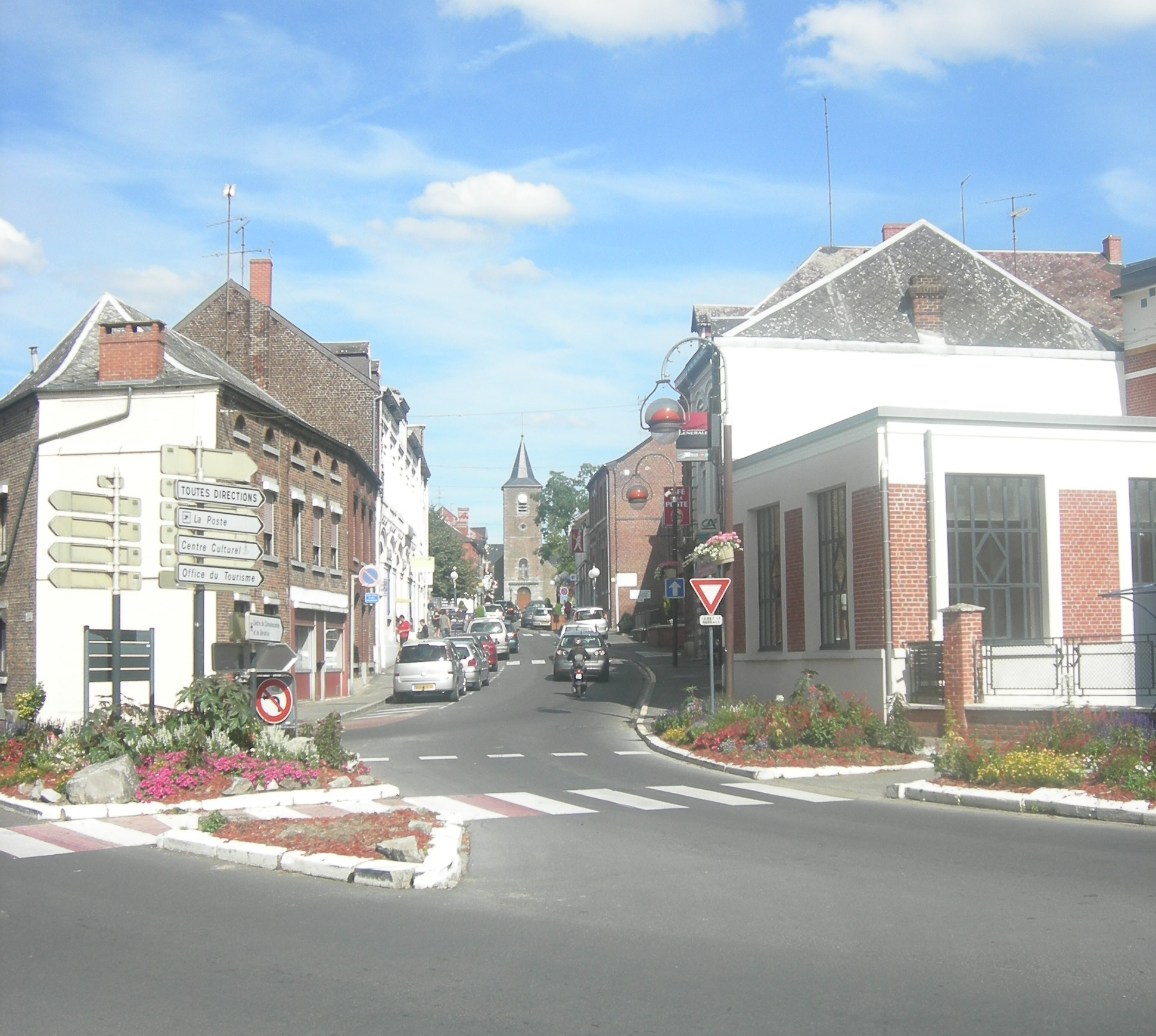
- A view within Jeumont

- Coat of arms
- Location of Jeumont
- Location within France Location within Hauts-de-France
- Coordinates: 50°17′43″N 4°06′07″E
- Country: France
- Region: Hauts-de-France
- Department: Nord
- Arrondissement: Avesnes-sur-Helpe
- Canton: Maubeuge
- Intercommunality: CA Maubeuge Val de Sambre

Government
  - Mayor (2022–2026): Pascal Ori
- Area^{1}: 10.21 km^{2} (3.94 sq mi)
- Elevation: 150 m (490 ft)
- Highest elevation: 201 m (659 ft)
- Lowest elevation: 122 m (400 ft)
- Population (2023): 10,160
  - Density: 995.1/km^{2} (2,577/sq mi)
- Time zone: UTC+01:00 (CET)
  - Summer (DST): UTC+02:00 (CEST)
- INSEE/Postal code: 59324 /59460
- ^{1} French Land Register data, which excludes lakes, ponds, glaciers > 1 km^{2} (0.386 sq mi or 247 acres) and river estuaries.

Jeumont (French pronunciation: [ʒømɔ̃]) is a commune in the Nord department in northern France. It lies on the Belgian border and on the river Sambre, adjacent to the Belgian town Erquelinnes. It is part of the agglomeration (unité urbaine) of Maubeuge.

== Population ==
Historical population
Year	Pop.	±% p.a.
1968	10,178	—
1975	10,120	−0.08%
1982	11,661	+2.05%
1990	11,048	−0.67%
1999	10,775	−0.28%
2007	9,956	−0.98%
2012	9,788	−0.34%
2017	10,159	+0.75%
2023	10,160	+0.00%
Source: INSEE

== Electrical engineering ==
The name of Jeumont is associated with several companies making heavy electrical equipment for wind turbines, nuclear reactors and naval propulsion. They have their origins in the Atelier de Construction Electrique du Nord et de l’Est (ACENE), which became part of the Empain group under the name Forges et Ateliers de Construction Electriques de Jeumont (FACEJ) in 1921, merged with Schneider Westinghouse in 1964 and in 1993 Jeumont Industrie became part of the Framatome group. Framatome became Areva, which in 2007 sold the generators and motors division of Jeumont SA to Altawest as Jeumont ELECTRIC. Areva retained the nuclear and wind turbine divisions, which were renamed JSPM.

== Heraldry ==
Arms of Jeumont	The arms of Jeumont are blazoned : Argent, 3 lions gules, overall a bend engrailed vert.

== See also ==
- Decauville railway of the Watissart quarries
- Communes of the Nord department
