= Decauville railway of the Watissart quarries =

Coordinates: 50.28494°N 4.0965°E

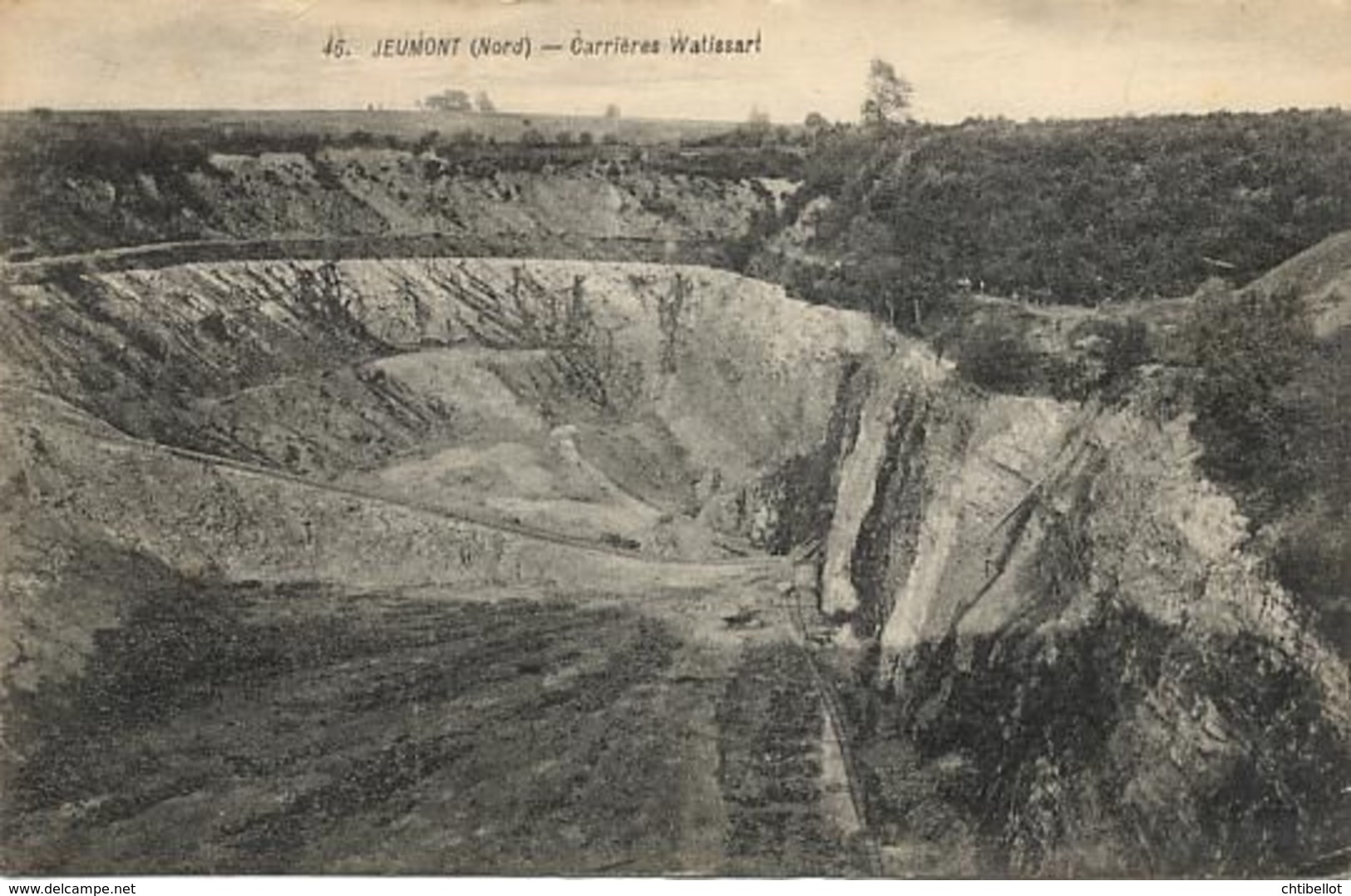
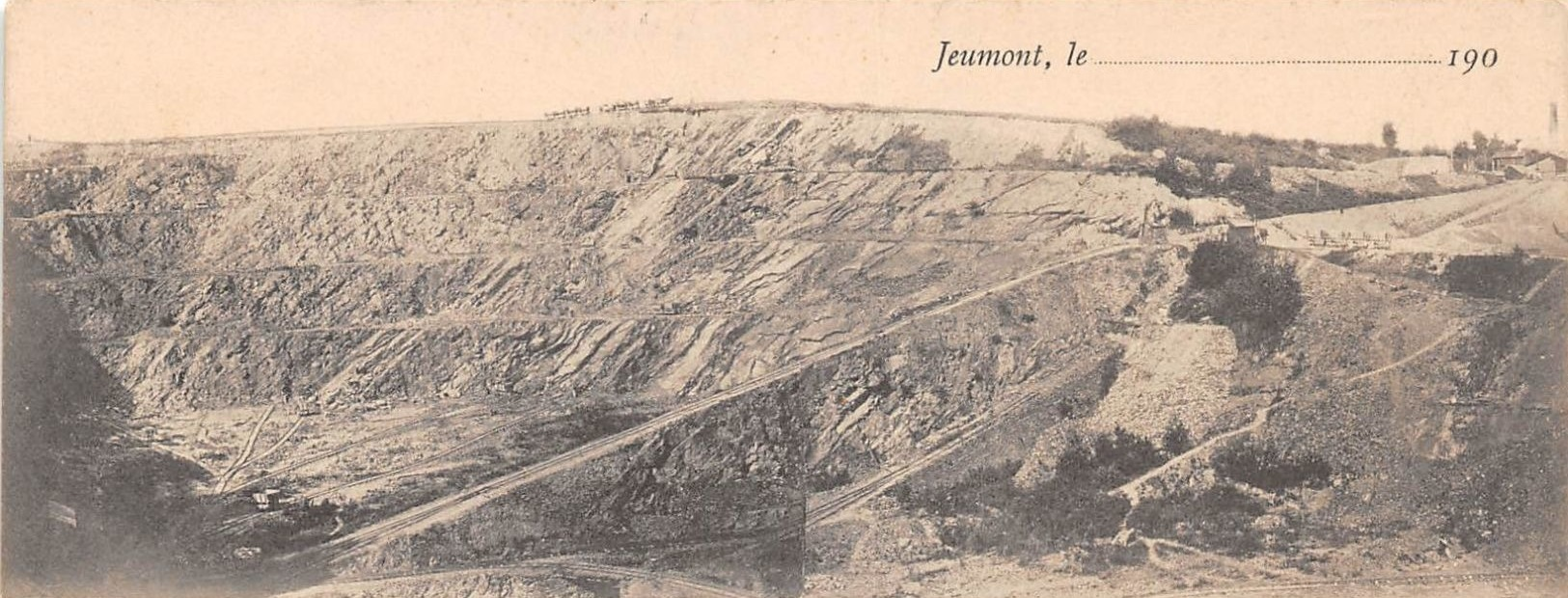
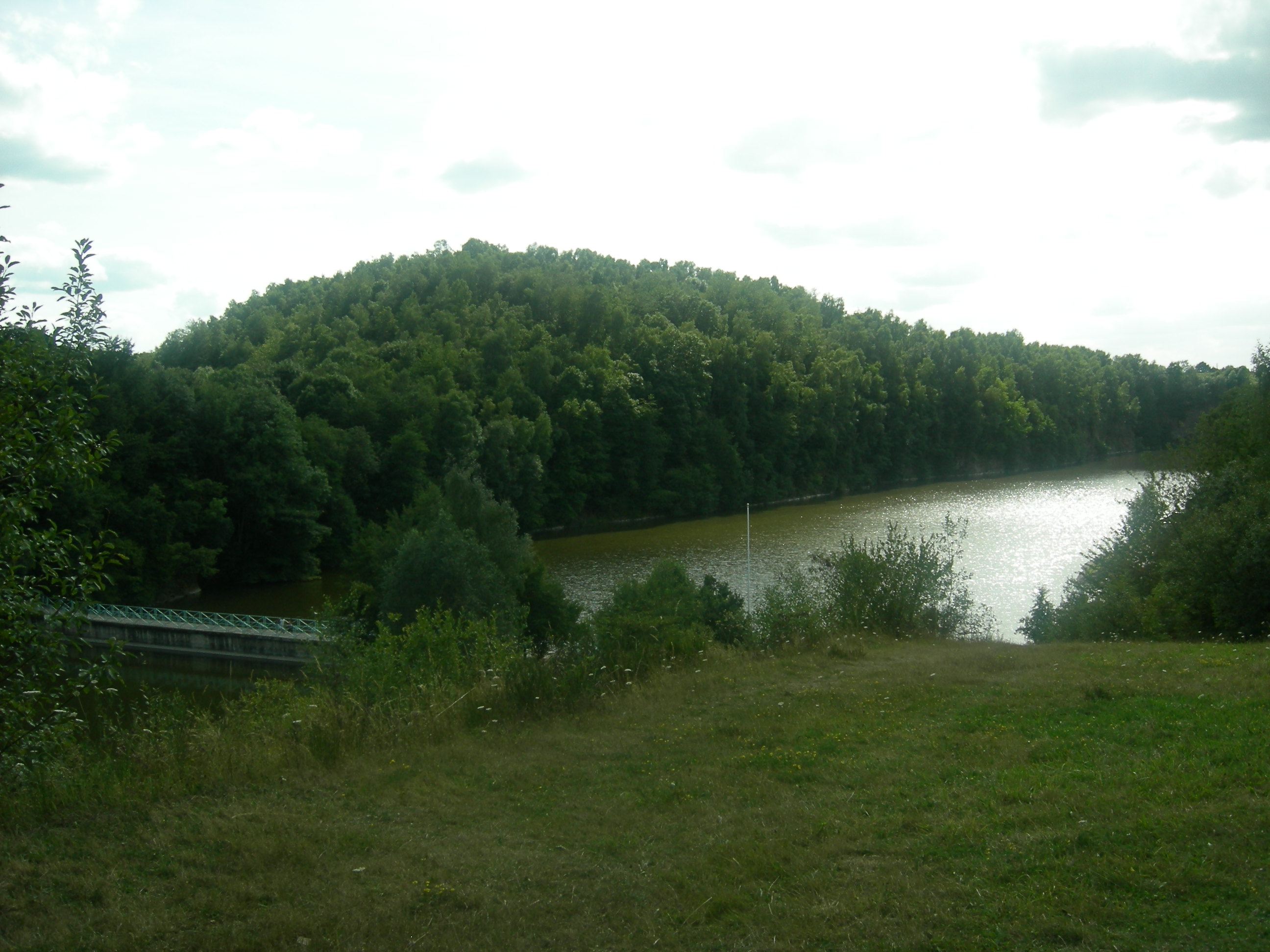
Carrières Watissart around 1909 and Lac du Watissart around 2009

The Decauville railway of the Watissart quarries was a narrow-gauge railway of the quartzite and marble quarries in Jeumont in the Département Nord in the Hauts-de-France region. The former quarries have been flooded to create a lake that is now used as a nature reserve and recreational area for fishing, swimming and diving.

== History ==
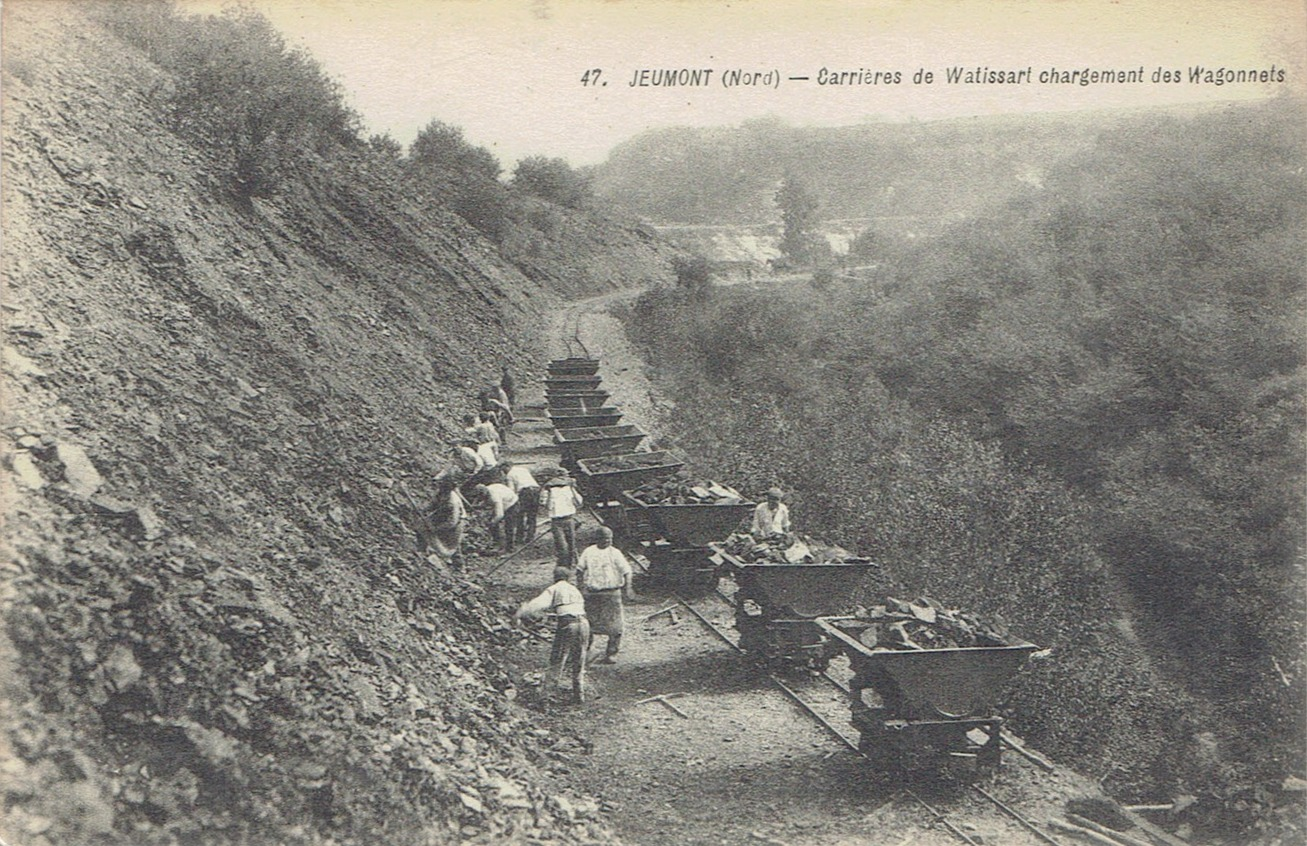
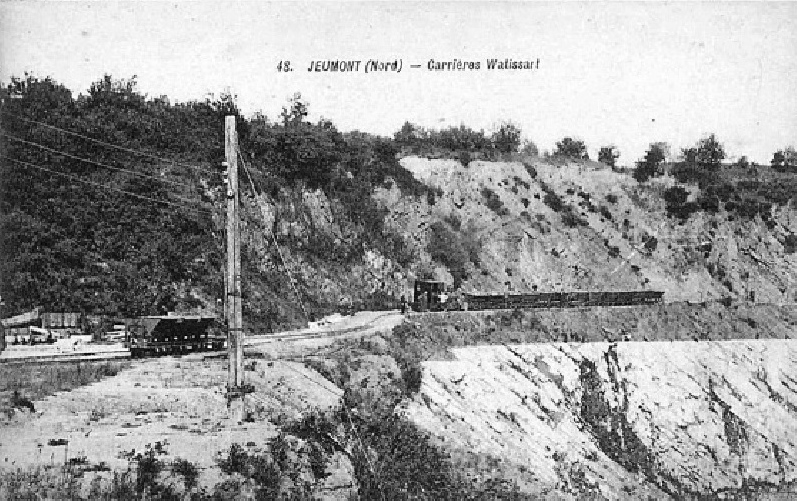
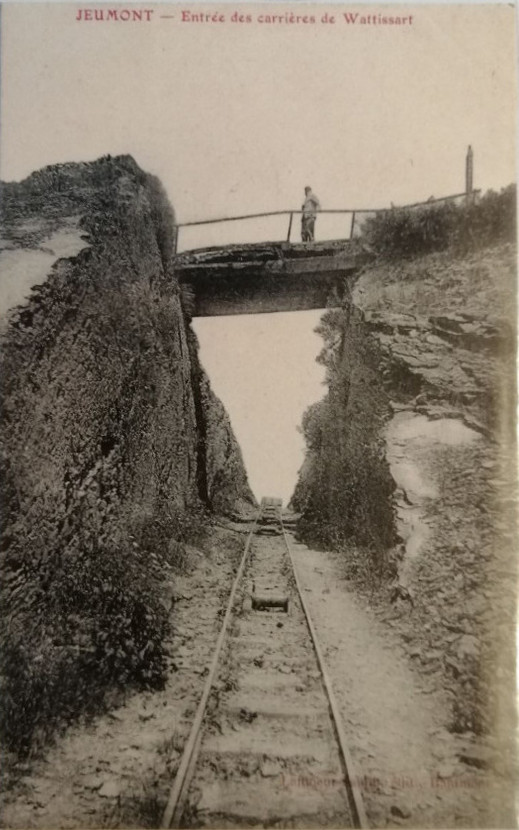
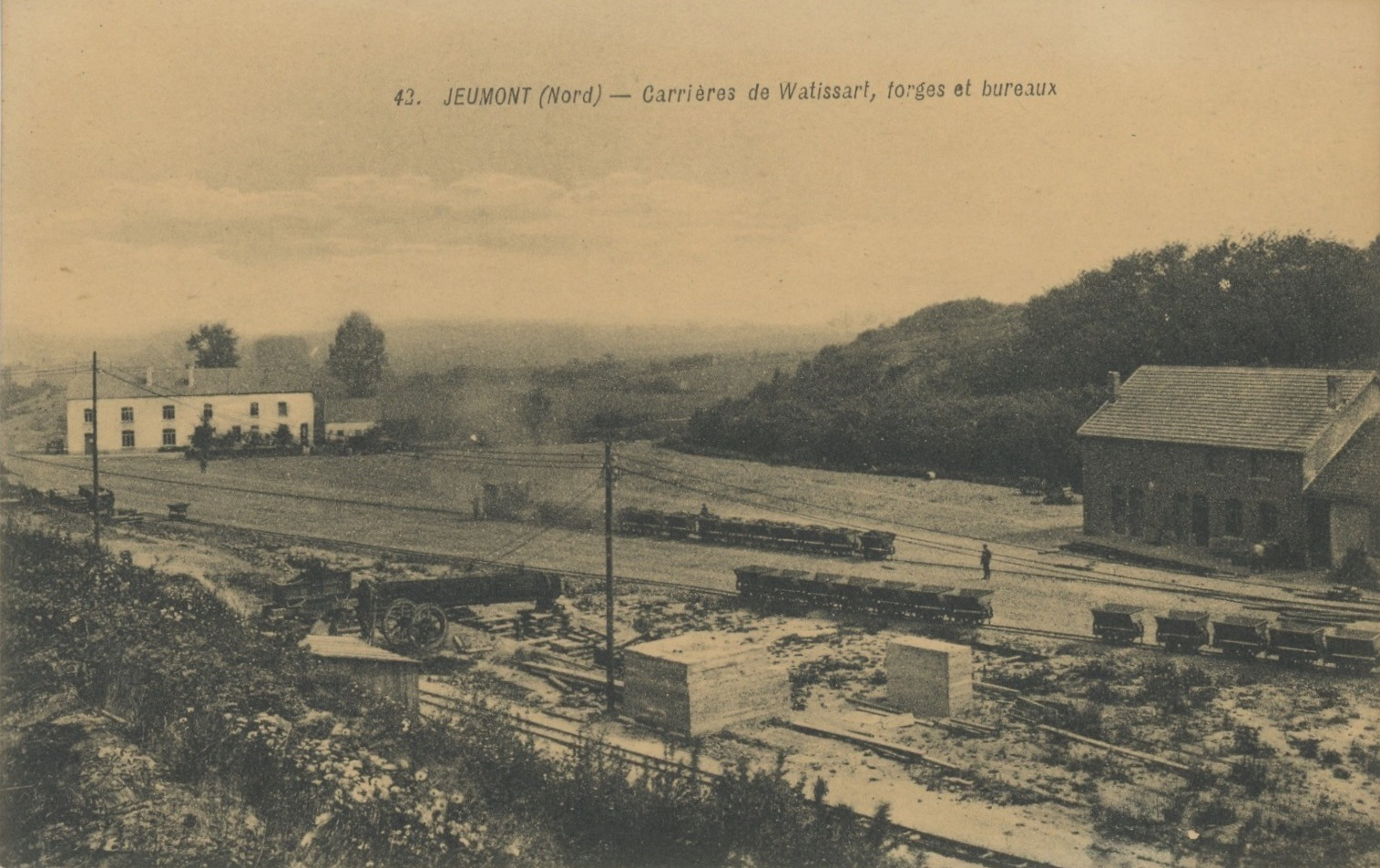
The V-skip-waggons of the Decauville railway were moved by hand, by steam locomotives and by winches

A quarry had already been excavated in 1790 in Jeumont on the orders of Charles Joseph de Ligne, but it was abandoned around 1900.

In 1930, there was a granite, marble and natural stone factory in Jeumont owned by Edouard Rombaux-Roland, who specialised in green, blue and red-black Labrador granite, syenite and porphyry. He imported, for example, Belgian granite for the Preuilly-la-Ville fallen monument and green and pearly Labrador granite from Norway for the erection of monuments. At that time, the former marble quarries had already been exhausted.

In the 1950s, the Belgian geological engineer Paul Dumon was the director of the company Les Marbres Français in Jeumont. He published two articles in the journal Le Mausolée, La géologie about the quarries.

== Tramway ==
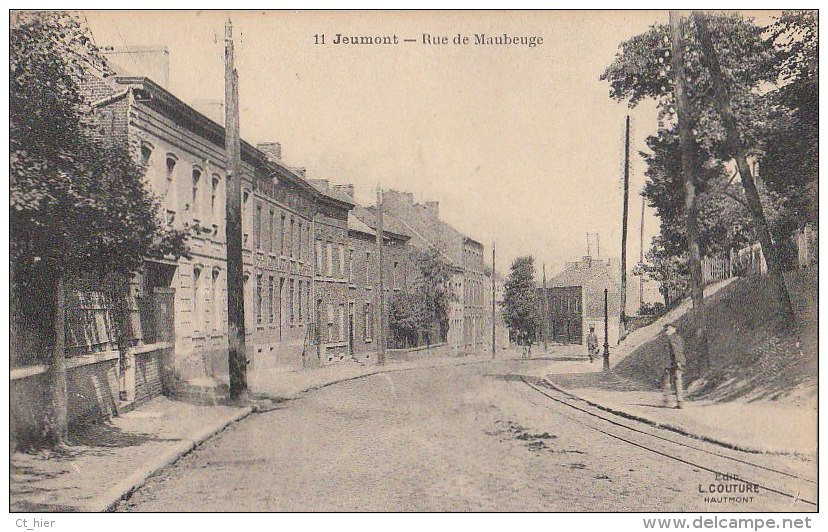
Old Decauville track in der Rue de Maubeuge

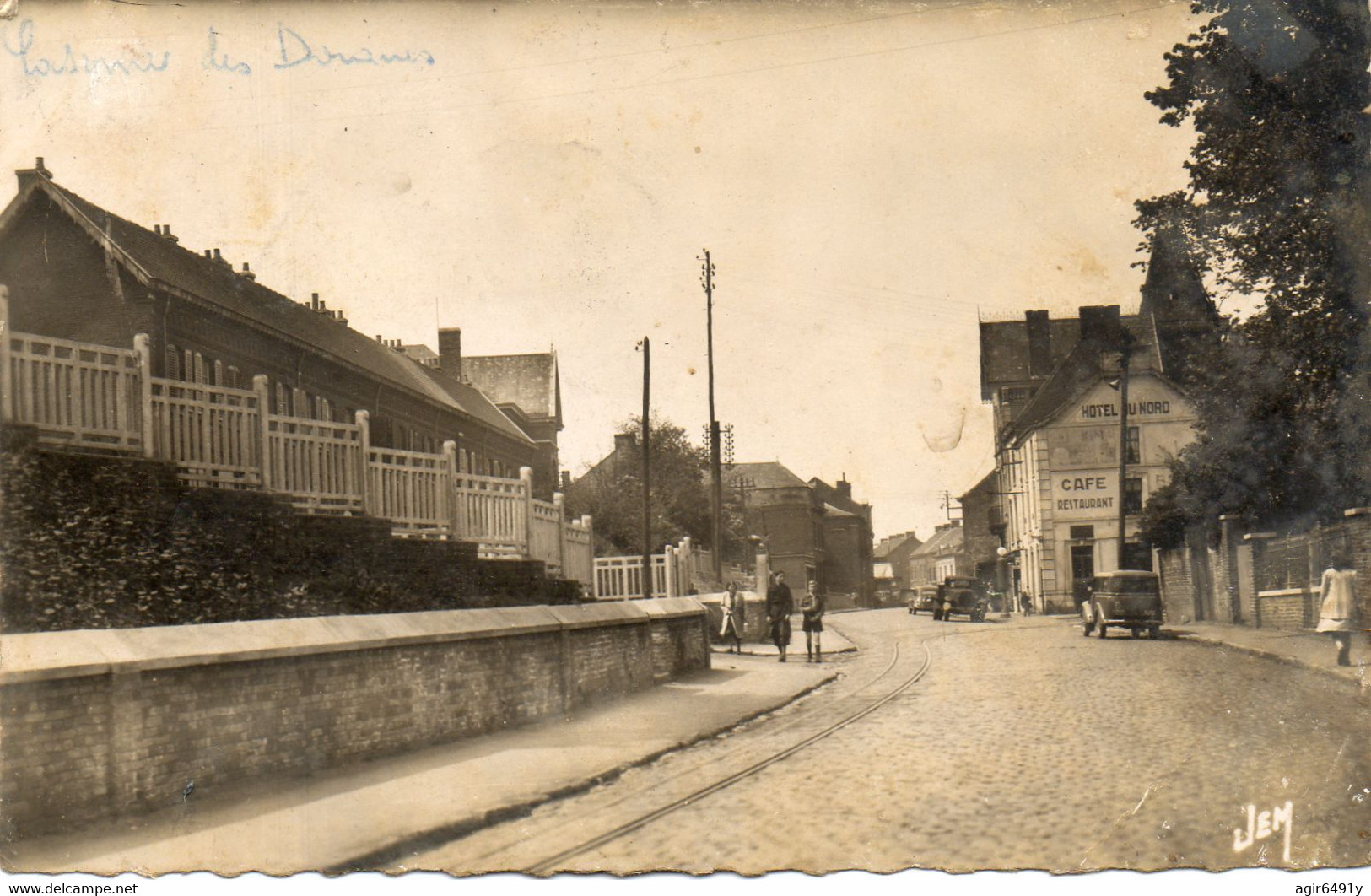
New tramway rails in the Rue de Maubeuge at the Hôtel du Nord

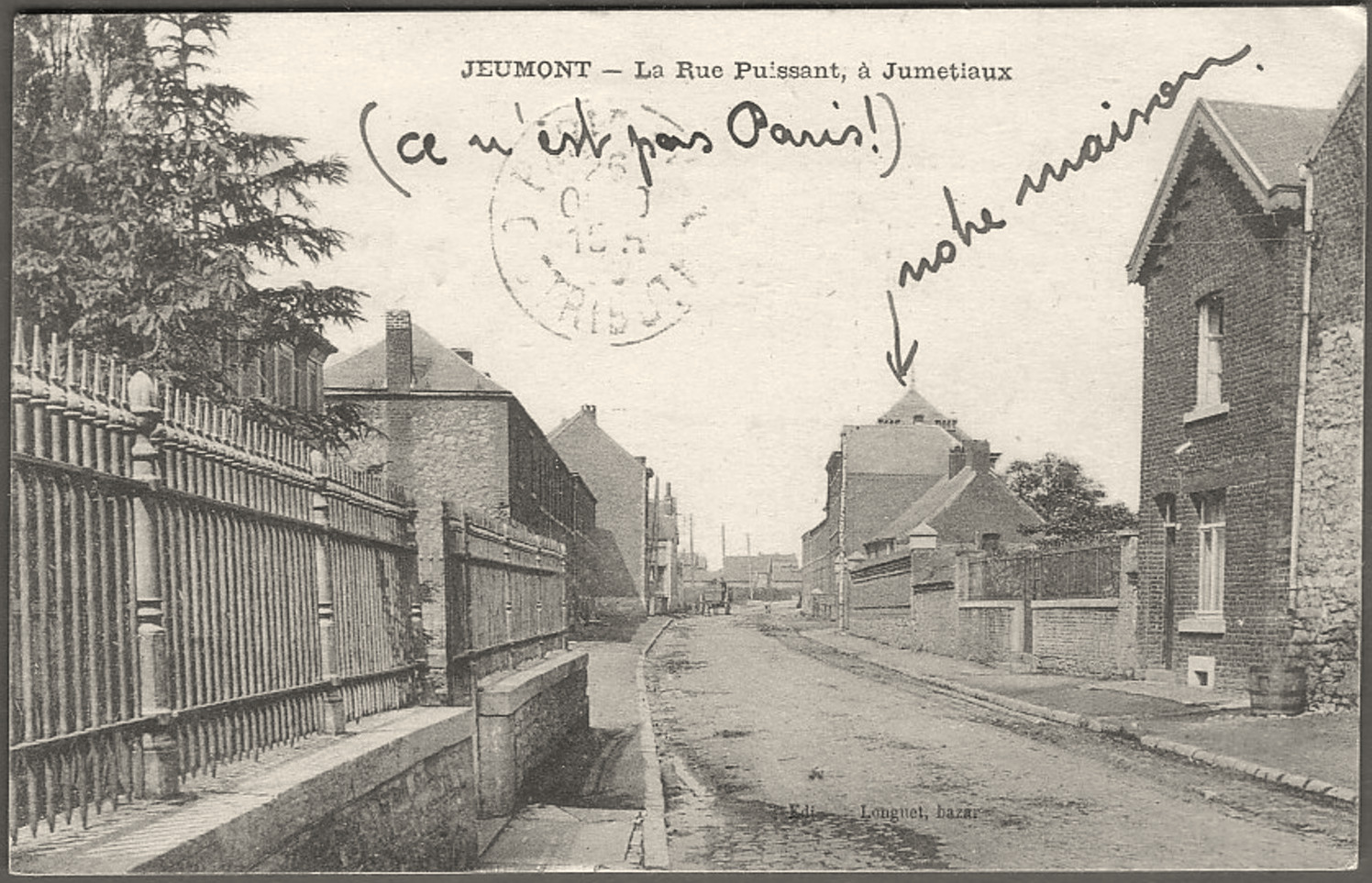
Disused rail track in der Rue Puissant

Companies served by the narrow gauge railway

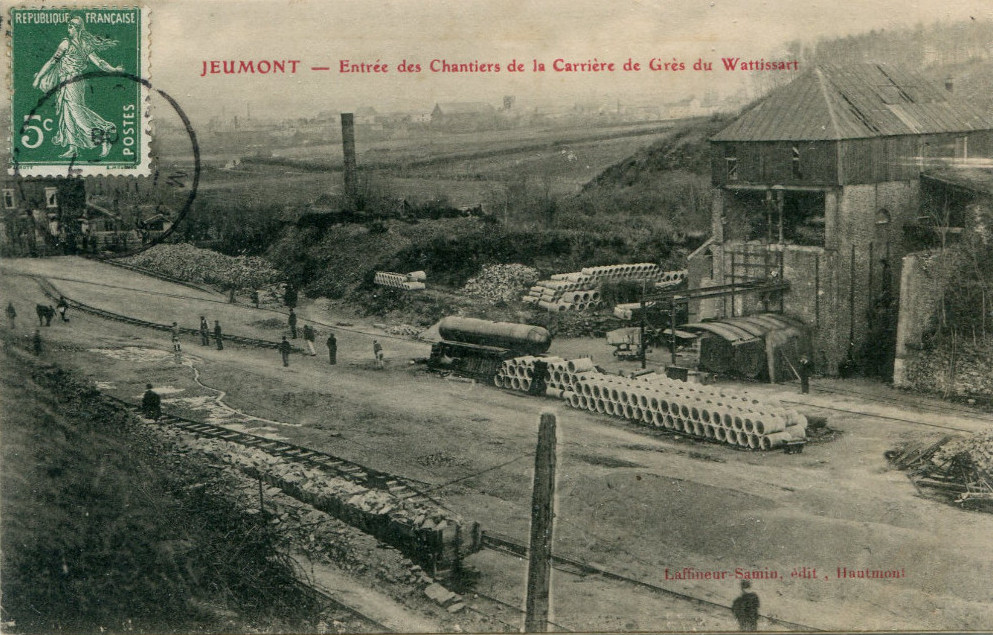
Tube store at the gate of the Carrière de Grès du Wattissart

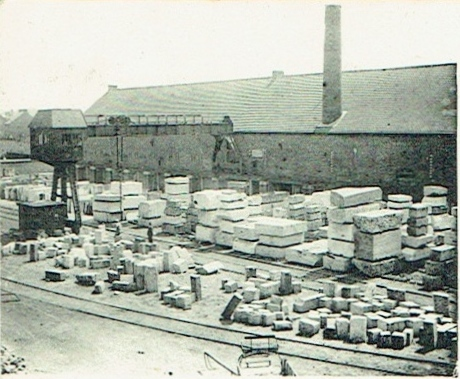
Société Anonyme de Merbes-le-Château

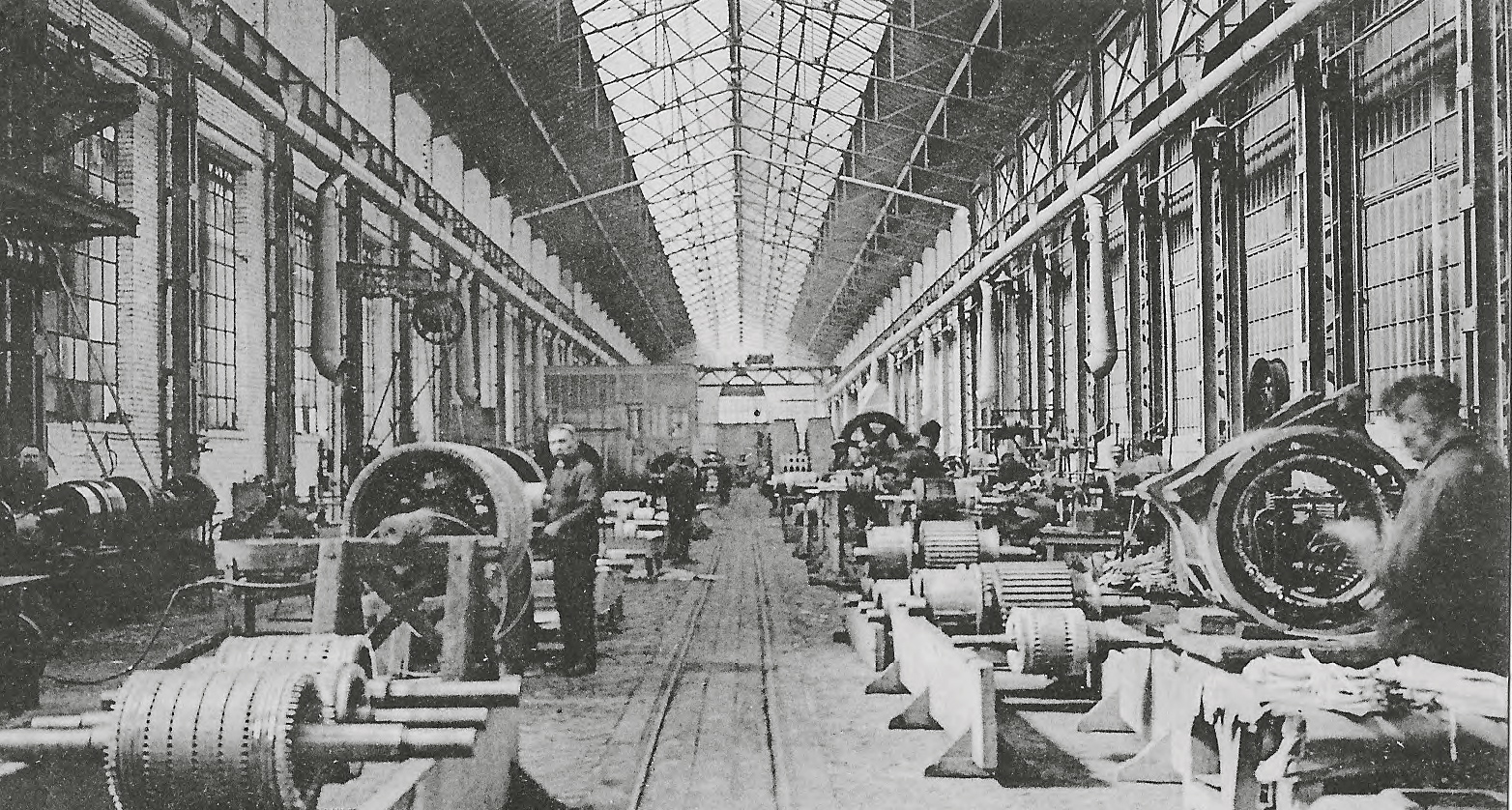
Assembly hall for large electrical motors of Ateliers de Construction Electriques

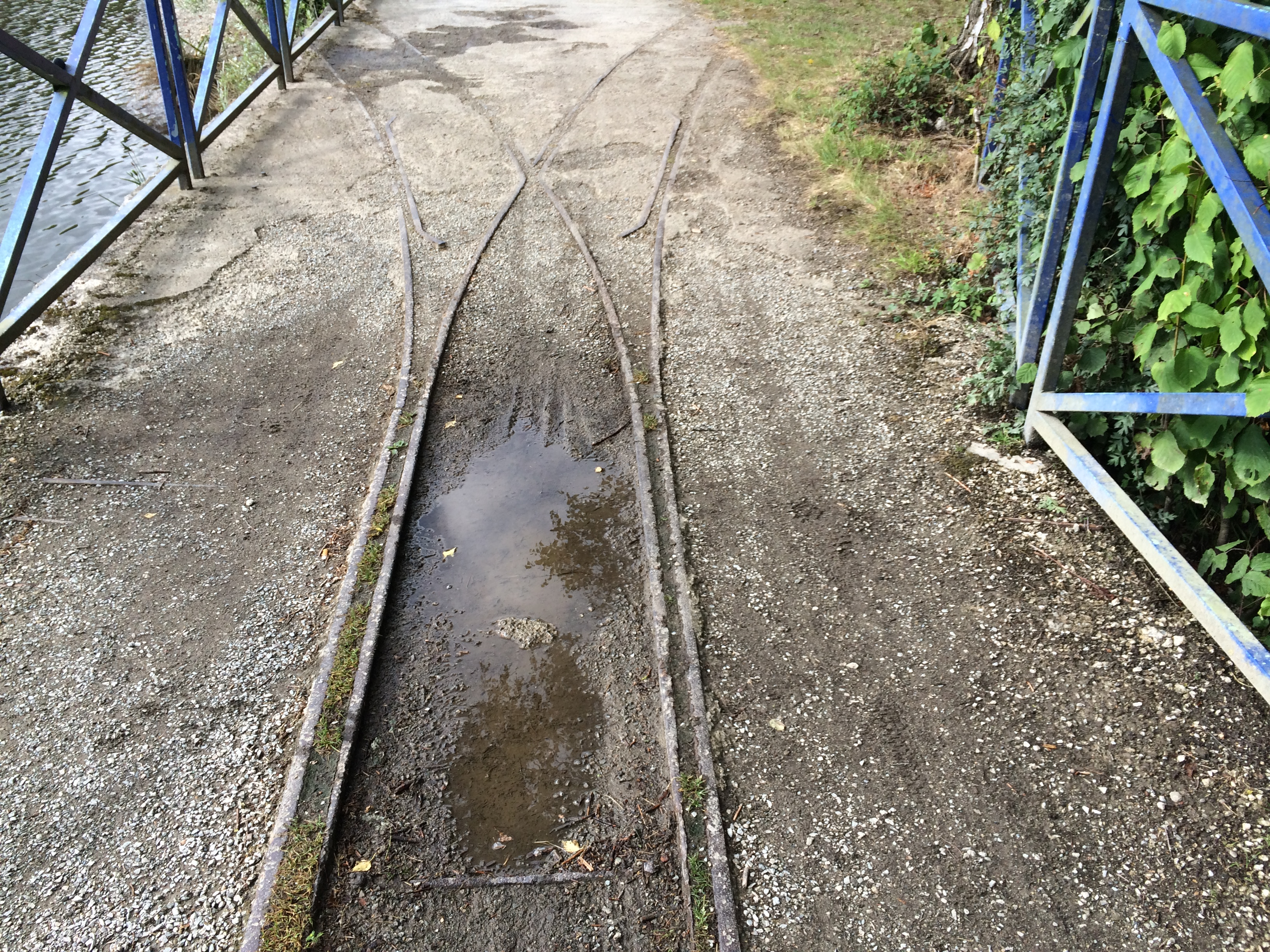
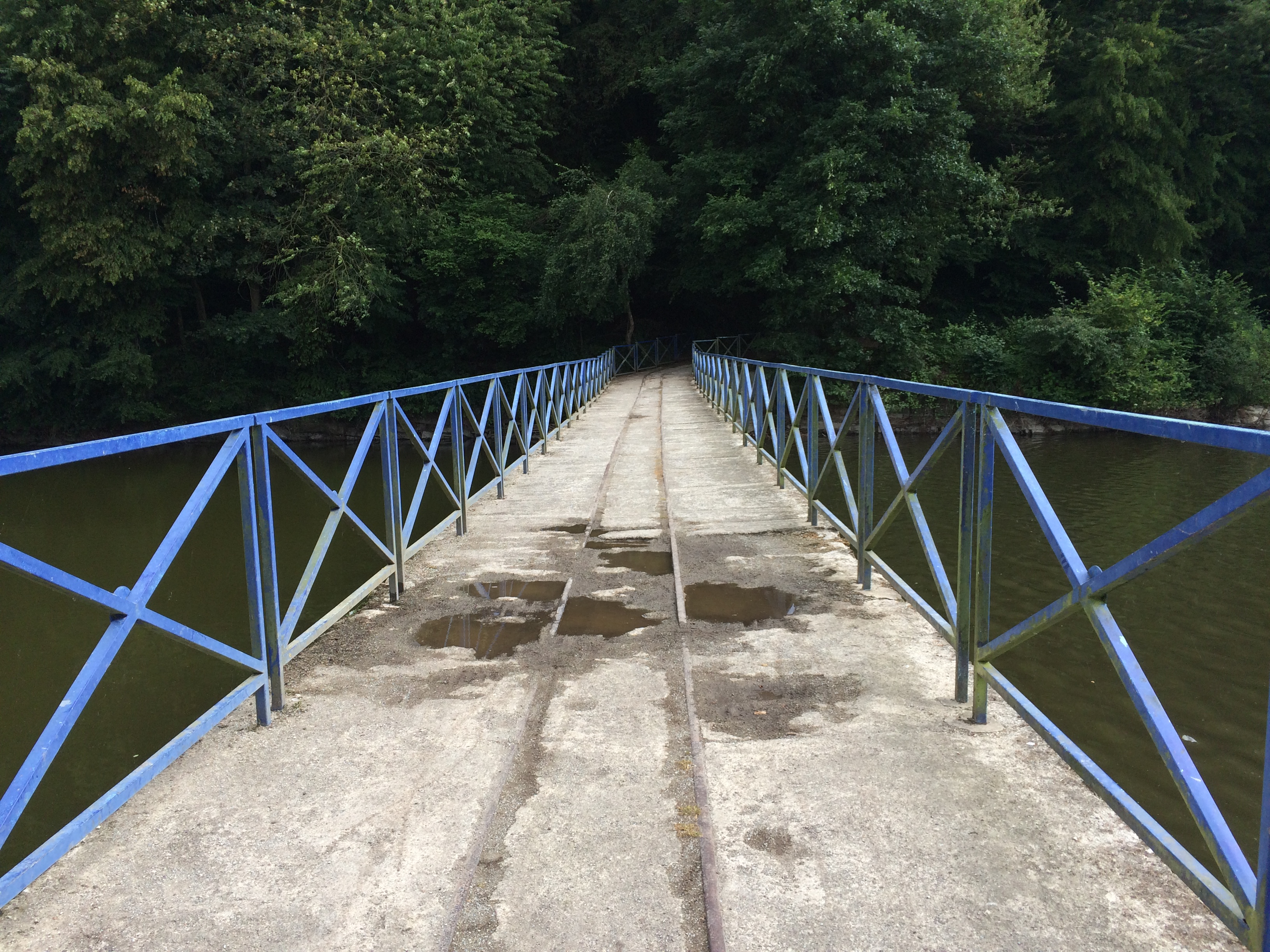
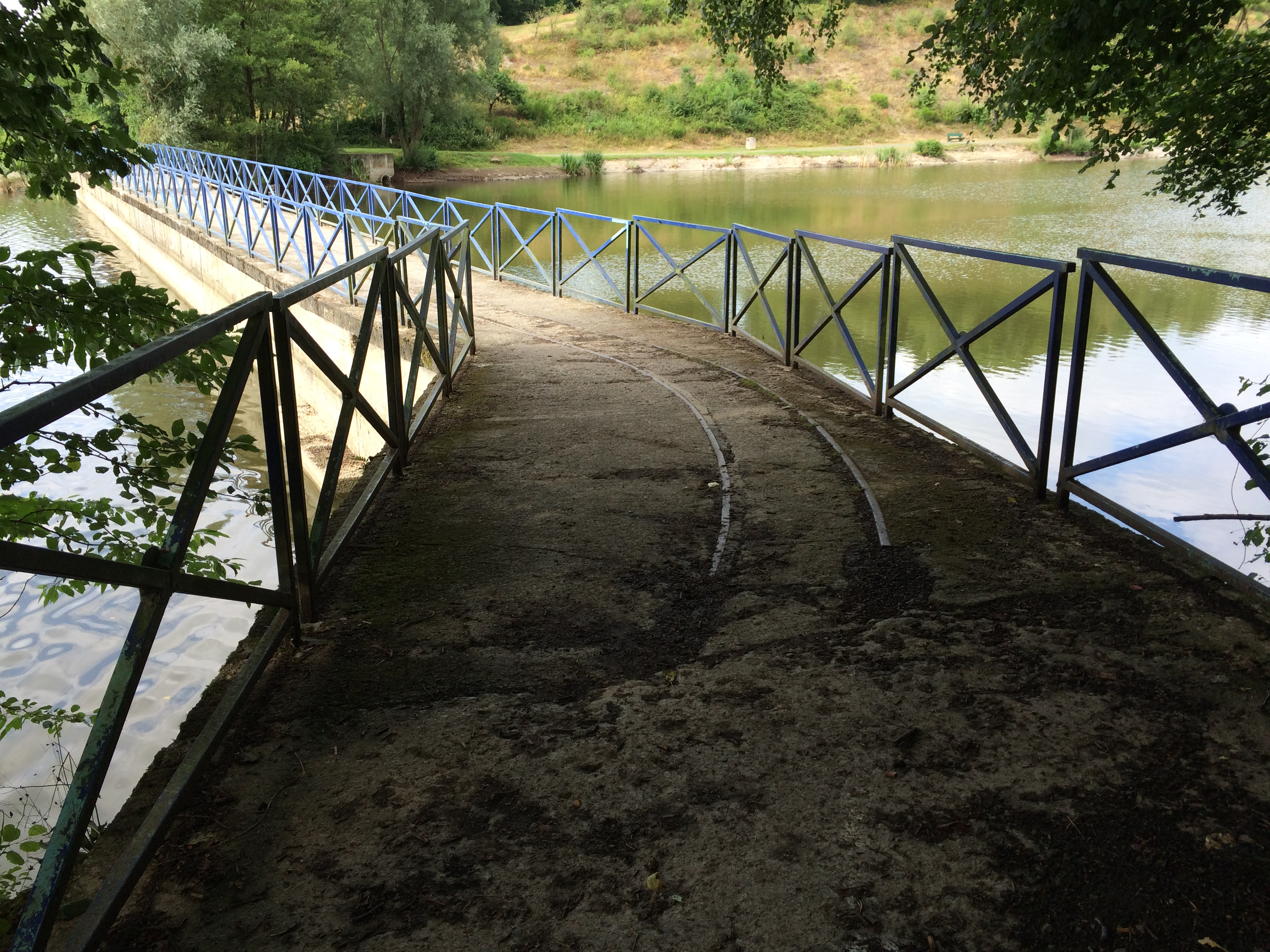
Remains of the narrow gauge railway

In Jeumont, the rock was used for steelmaking and loaded onto canal ships and the standard gauge railway, as it was needed in large quantities as ballast for road and railway construction.

The Decauville railway with a gauge of 600 mm (1 ft 11 5/8 in) ran from the quarries to the forges and offices at the railway station, near which other metalworking factories and electric motor works were opened up via the narrow-gauge railway around 1932. The Decauville railway was operated with steam locomotives and numerous tipping lorries. Remains of the tracks are still preserved on the embankment that divides the lake into two parts. In the newly created park on Rue de la Gare, the park paths follow the route of the former light railway.
