= Villers-au-Tertre =

- Commune
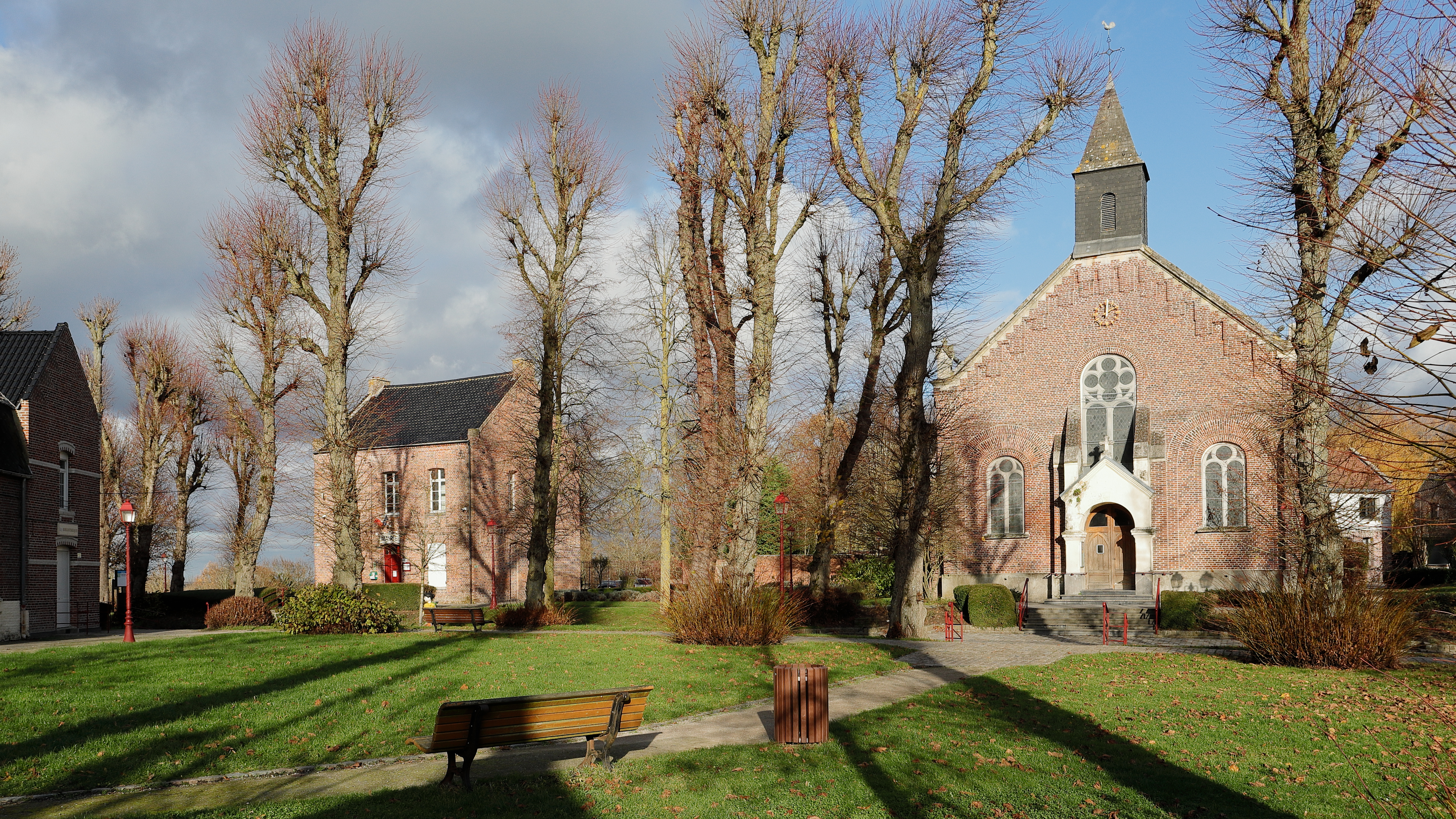
- Mont Tilleul Square

- Coat of arms
- Location of Villers-au-Tertre
- Location within France Location within Hauts-de-France
- Coordinates: 50°18′10″N 3°11′00″E
- Country: France
- Region: Hauts-de-France
- Department: Nord
- Arrondissement: Douai
- Canton: Aniche
- Intercommunality: Douaisis Agglo

Government
  - Mayor (2020–2026): Patrick Mercier
- Area^{1}: 4.57 km^{2} (1.76 sq mi)
- Highest elevation: 86 m (282 ft)
- Lowest elevation: 48 m (157 ft)
- Population (2023): 670
  - Density: 150/km^{2} (380/sq mi)
- Time zone: UTC+01:00 (CET)
  - Summer (DST): UTC+02:00 (CEST)
- INSEE/Postal code: 59620 /59234
- ^{1} French Land Register data, which excludes lakes, ponds, glaciers > 1 km^{2} (0.386 sq mi or 247 acres) and river estuaries.

Villers-au-Tertre (French pronunciation: [vilɛʁ o tɛʁtʁ]) is a commune in the Nord department in northern France. It is around 10 km south-east of Douai.

== Surrounding communes ==
Neighbouring communes are Erchin to the north, Monchecourt to the east, Fressain to the south-east and Bugnicourt to the south-west.

== Heraldry ==
Arms of Villers-au-Tertre	The arms of Villers-au-Tertre are blazoned : Azure, an inescutcheon between in orle 11 billets argent. (Ligny-en-Cambrésis, Masnières and Villers-au-Tertre use the same arms.)

== Unwelcome fame ==
Villers-au-Tertre hit the headlines at the end of July 2010 because the new owner of a house in the village, while trying to plant a tree, found the bones of two newly born children buried in the garden. Subsequently six more bodies were discovered at the recently acquired home of the former proprietor's daughter and son in law. The presumed mother of the deceased children has been placed under judicial investigation

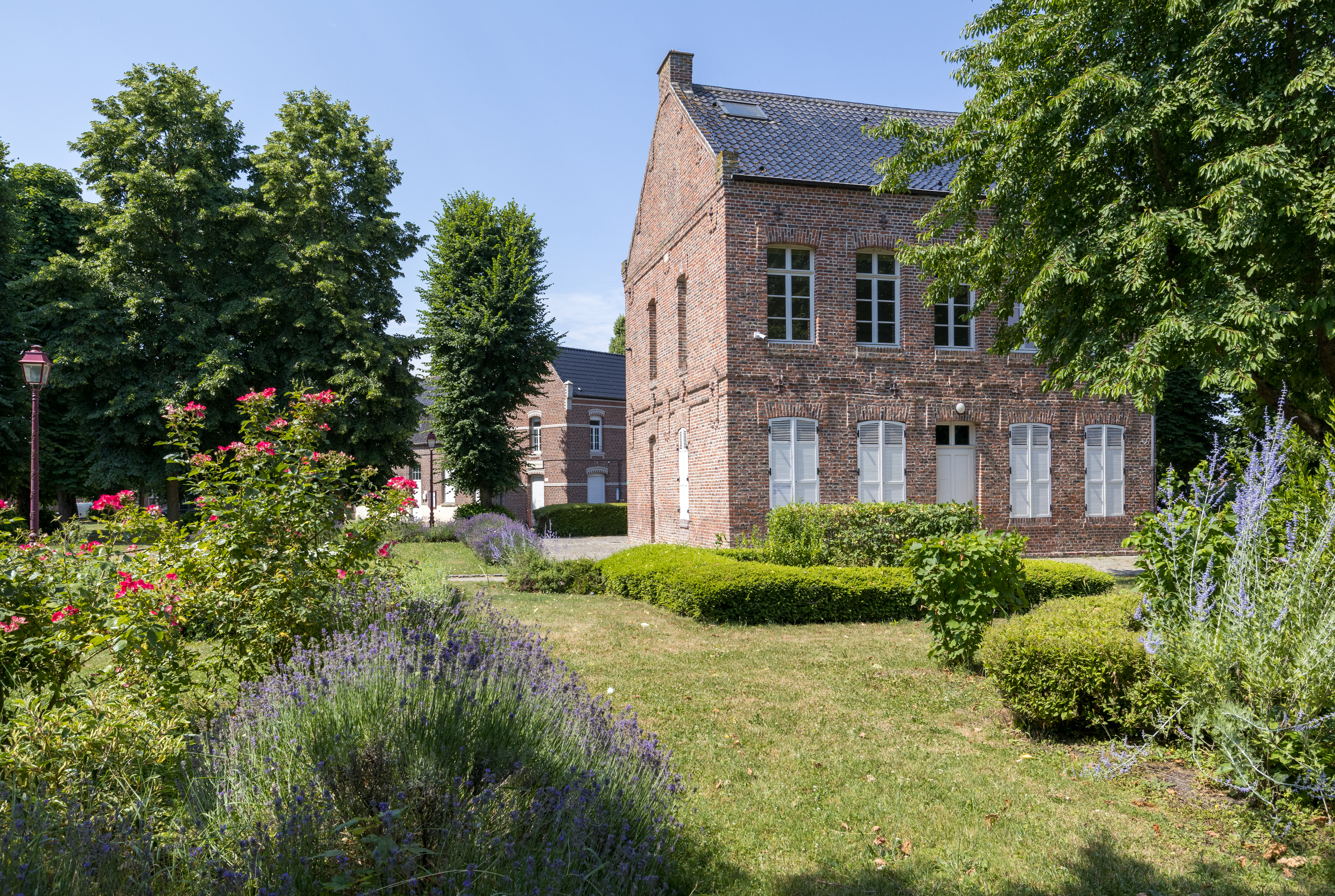
The town hall from 1881

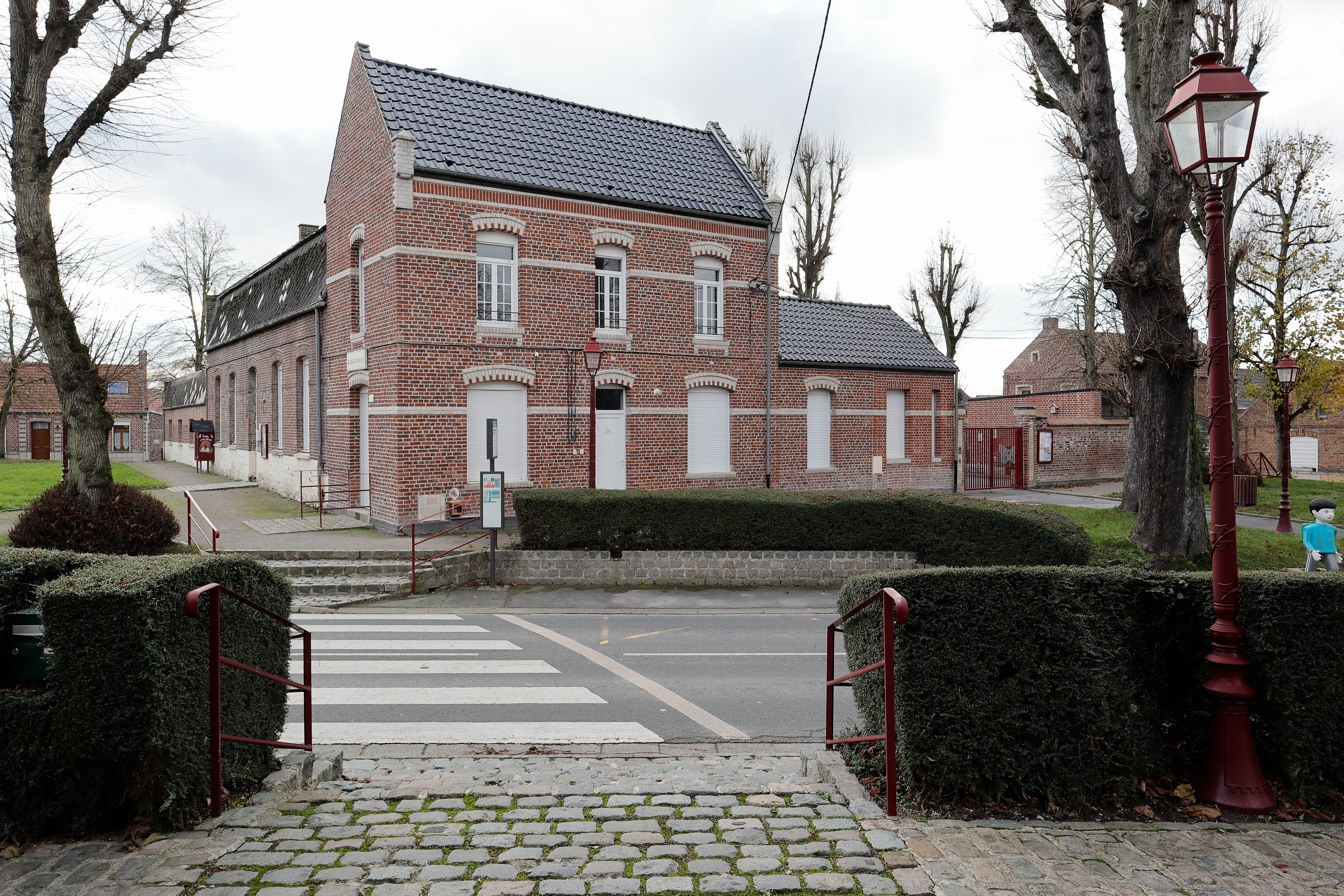
The school

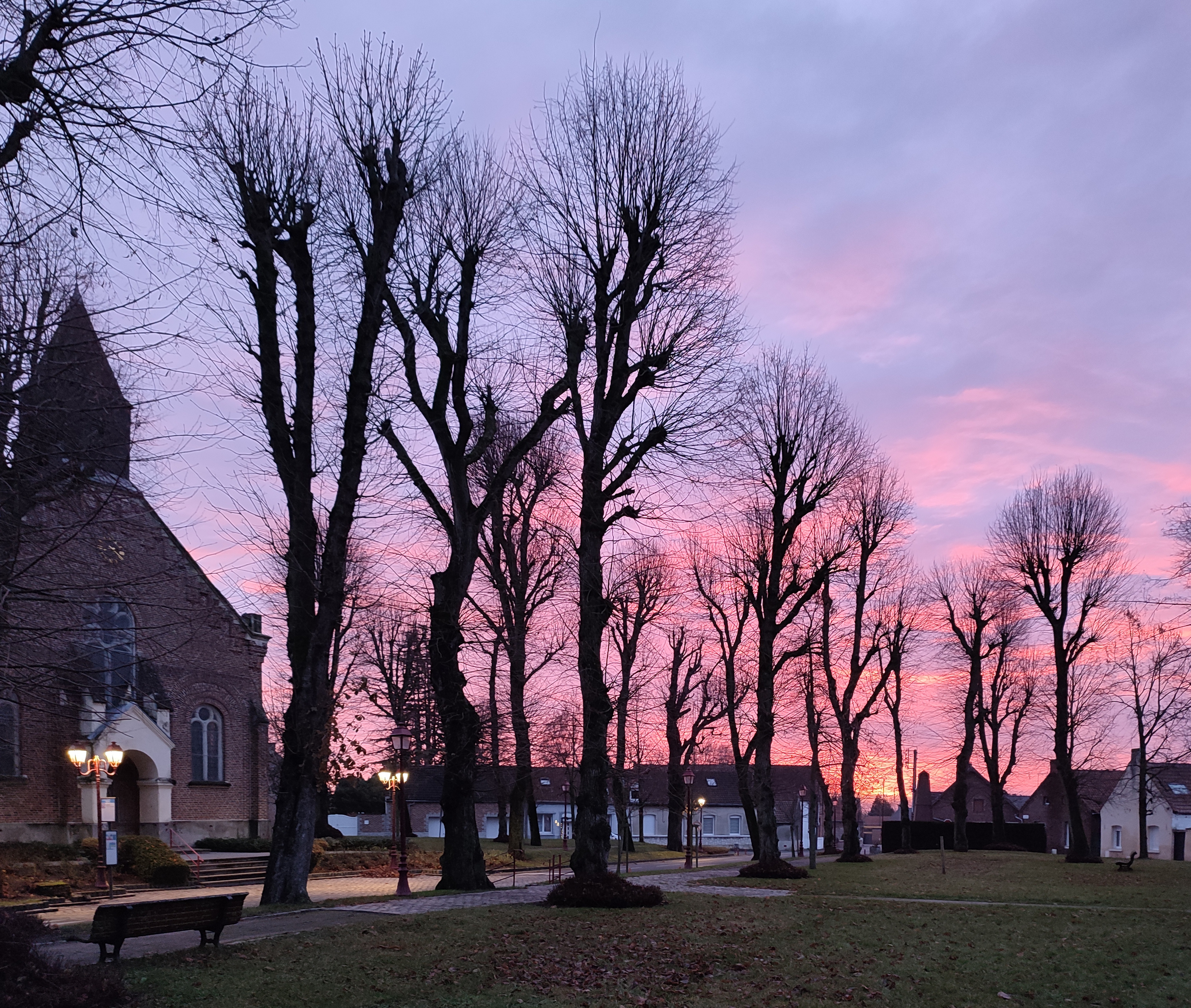
Sunrise over Mont Tilleul Square

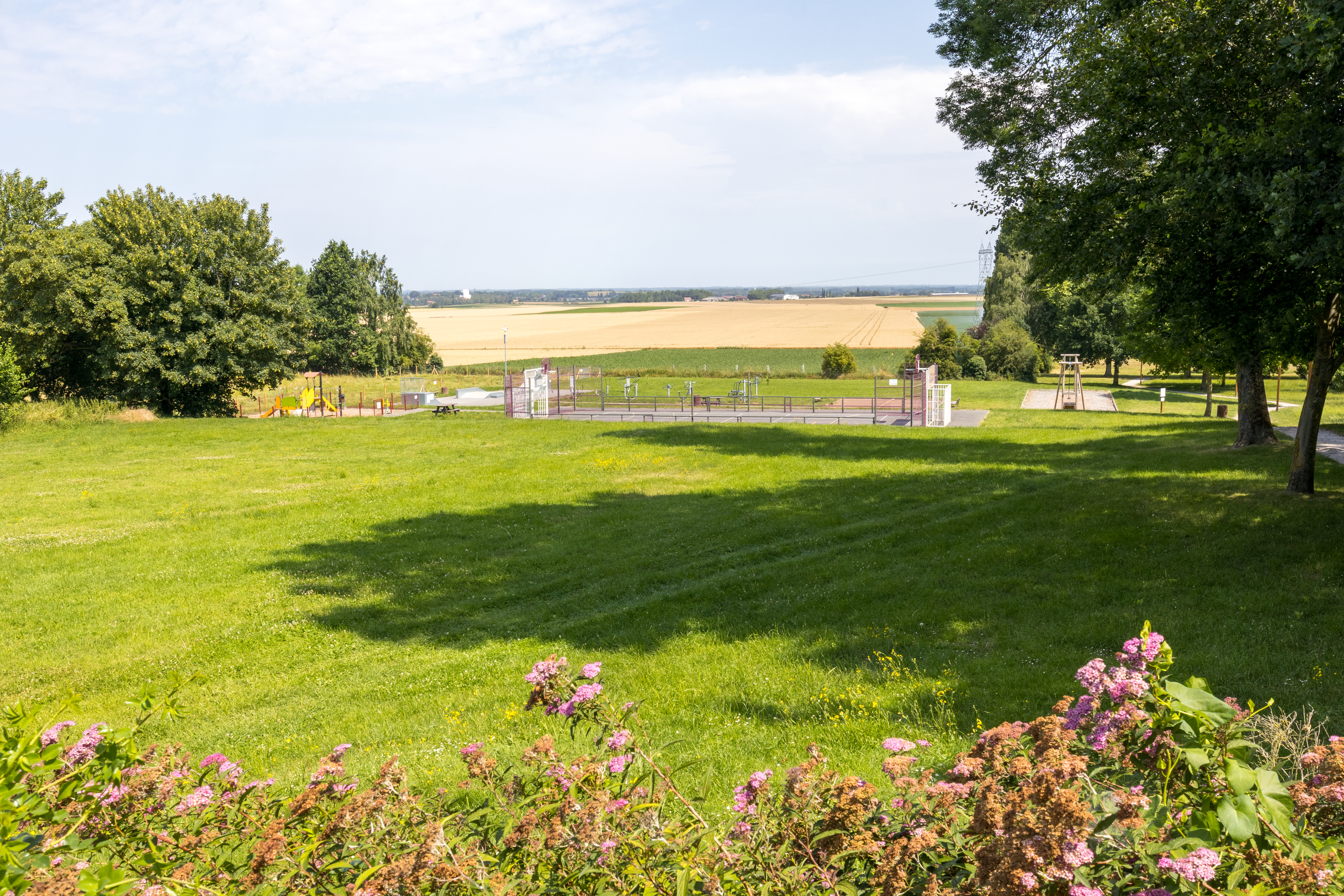
The sports complex

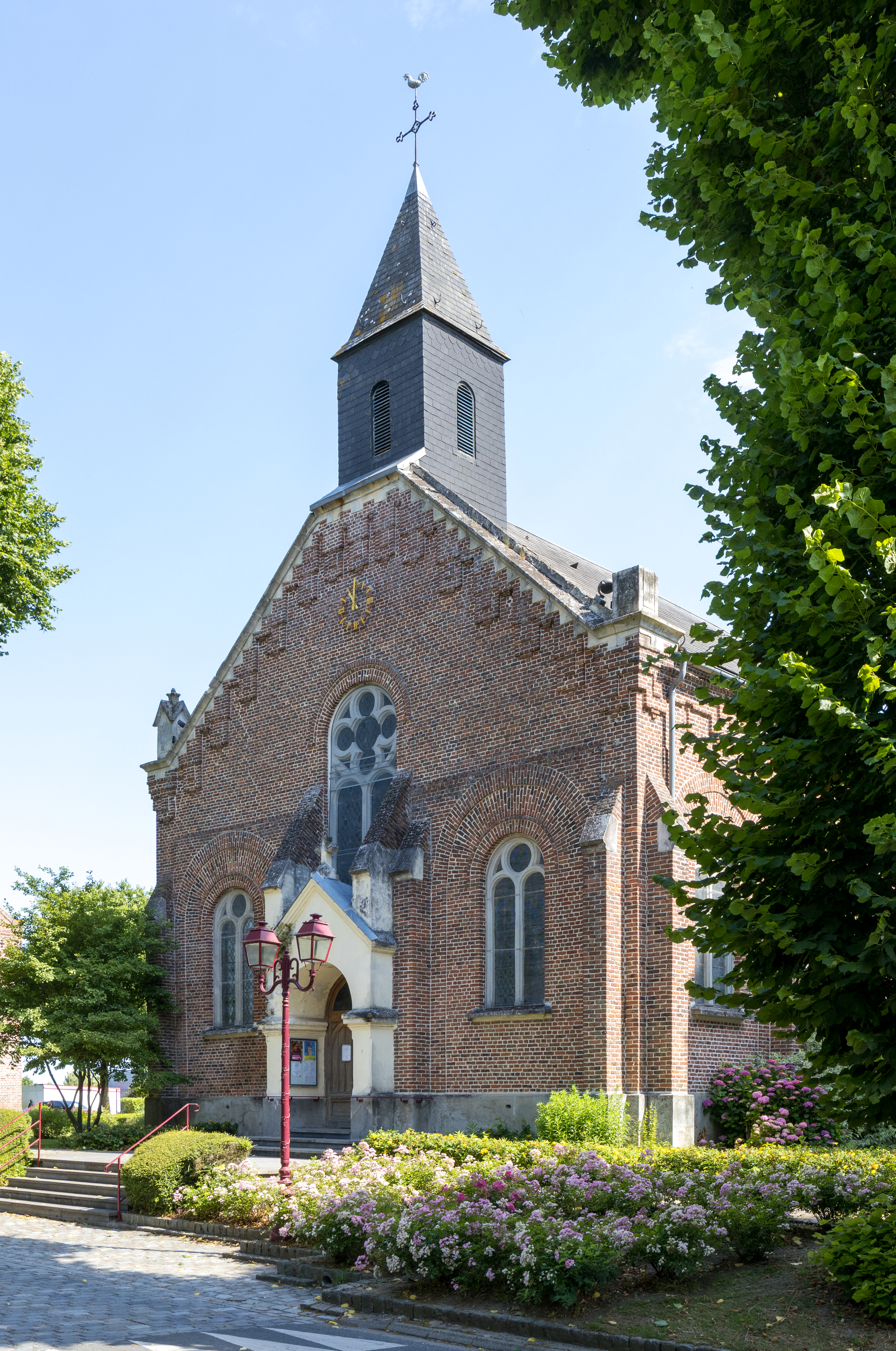
The church, built in 1873

== See also ==
- Communes of the Nord department
