= Anhiers =

- Commune
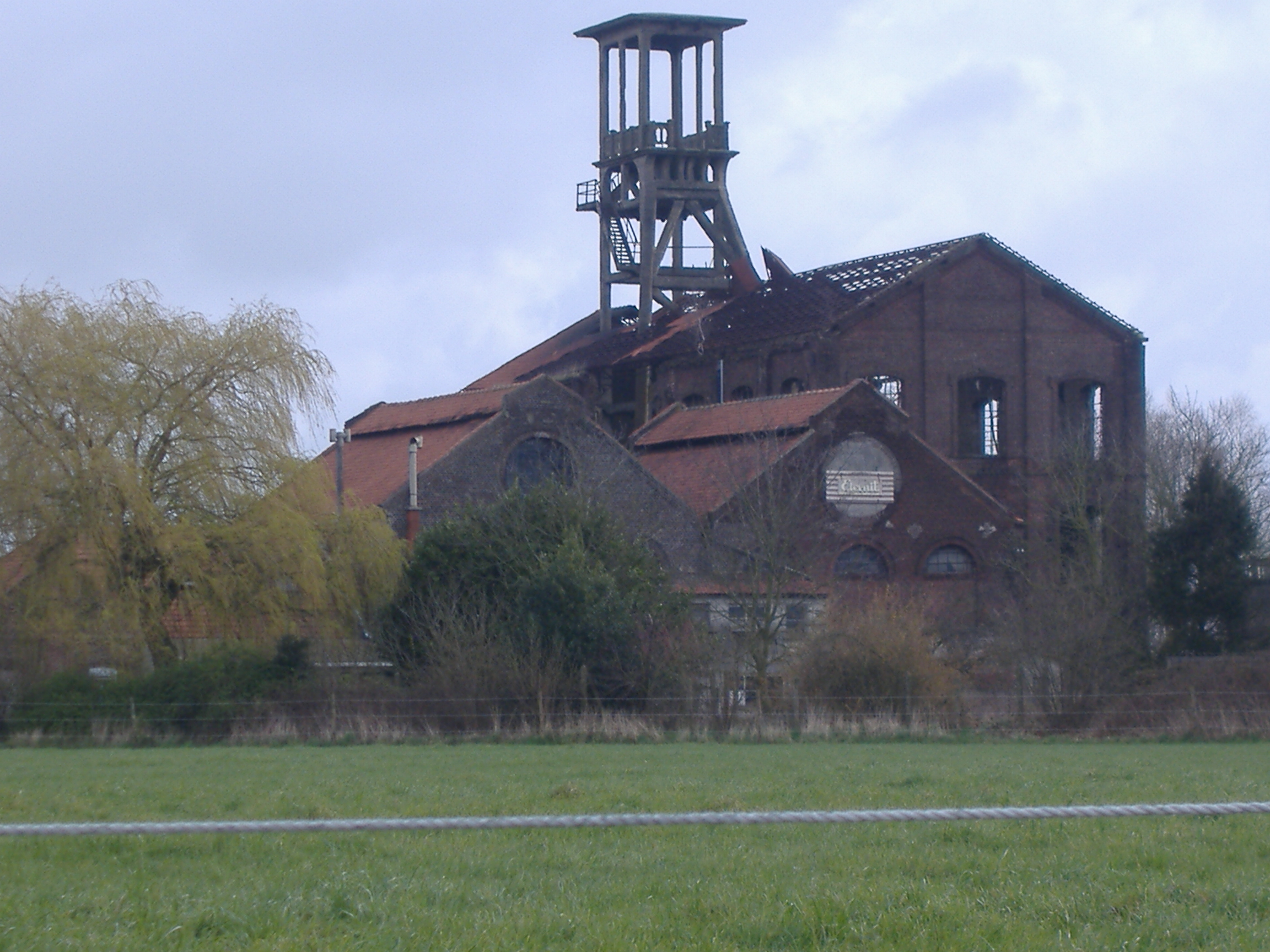
- Former coal mine

- Coat of arms
- Location of Anhiers
- Location within France Location within Hauts-de-France
- Coordinates: 50°24′27″N 3°09′24″E
- Country: France
- Region: Hauts-de-France
- Department: Nord
- Arrondissement: Douai
- Canton: Orchies
- Intercommunality: Douaisis Agglo

Government
  - Mayor (2020–2026): Nadine Mortelette-Vahé
- Area^{1}: 1.71 km^{2} (0.66 sq mi)
- Elevation: 23 m (75 ft)
- Highest elevation: 22 m (72 ft)
- Lowest elevation: 17 m (56 ft)
- Population (2023): 888
  - Density: 519/km^{2} (1,340/sq mi)
- Time zone: UTC+01:00 (CET)
  - Summer (DST): UTC+02:00 (CEST)
- INSEE/Postal code: 59007 /59194
- ^{1} French Land Register data, which excludes lakes, ponds, glaciers > 1 km^{2} (0.386 sq mi or 247 acres) and river estuaries.

Anhiers is a commune in the Nord department in northern France.

== Population ==
Historical population
Year	Pop.	±% p.a.
1968	780	—
1975	754	−0.48%
1982	687	−1.32%
1990	954	+4.19%
1999	985	+0.36%
2007	992	+0.09%
2012	949	−0.88%
2017	898	−1.10%
2023	888	−0.19%
Source: INSEE

== Heraldry ==
Arms of Anhiers	The arms of Anhiers are blazoned : Per fess Or and azure, 3 fleurs de lys counterchanged. (Anhiers and Merville use the same arms.)

== See also ==
- Communes of the Nord department
