= Aubigny-au-Bac =

- Commune
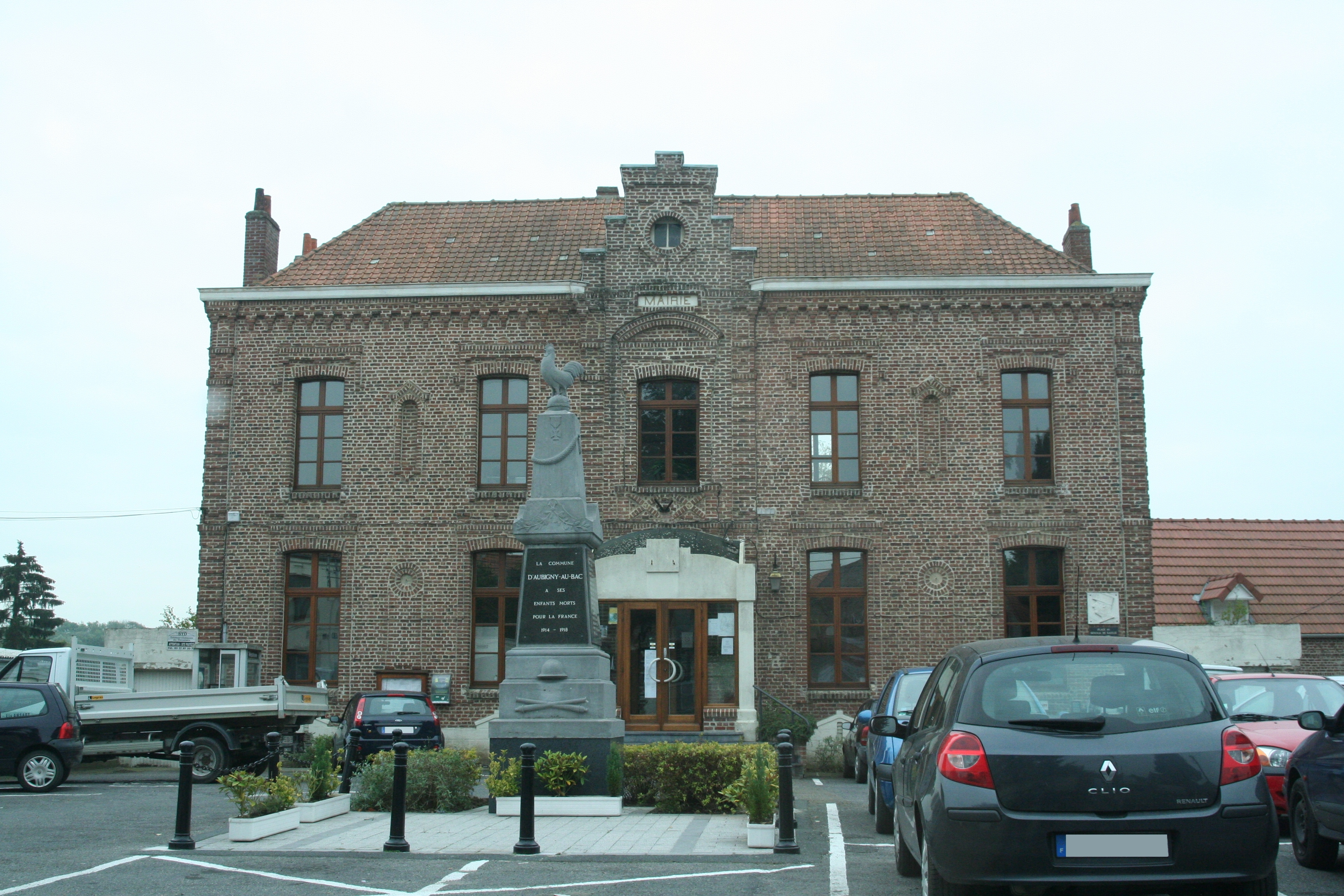
- The town hall in Aubigny-au-Bac

- Coat of arms
- Location of Aubigny-au-Bac
- Location within France Location within Hauts-de-France
- Coordinates: 50°15′48″N 3°09′55″E
- Country: France
- Region: Hauts-de-France
- Department: Nord
- Arrondissement: Douai
- Canton: Aniche
- Intercommunality: Douaisis Agglo

Government
  - Mayor (2025–2026): Marie-Madeleine Lefebvre
- Area^{1}: 5.16 km^{2} (1.99 sq mi)
- Highest elevation: 61 m (200 ft)
- Lowest elevation: 32 m (105 ft)
- Population (2023): 1,143
  - Density: 222/km^{2} (574/sq mi)
- Time zone: UTC+01:00 (CET)
  - Summer (DST): UTC+02:00 (CEST)
- INSEE/Postal code: 59026 /59265
- ^{1} French Land Register data, which excludes lakes, ponds, glaciers > 1 km^{2} (0.386 sq mi or 247 acres) and river estuaries.

Aubigny-au-Bac (French pronunciation: [obiɲi o bak]) is a commune in the Nord department in northern France.

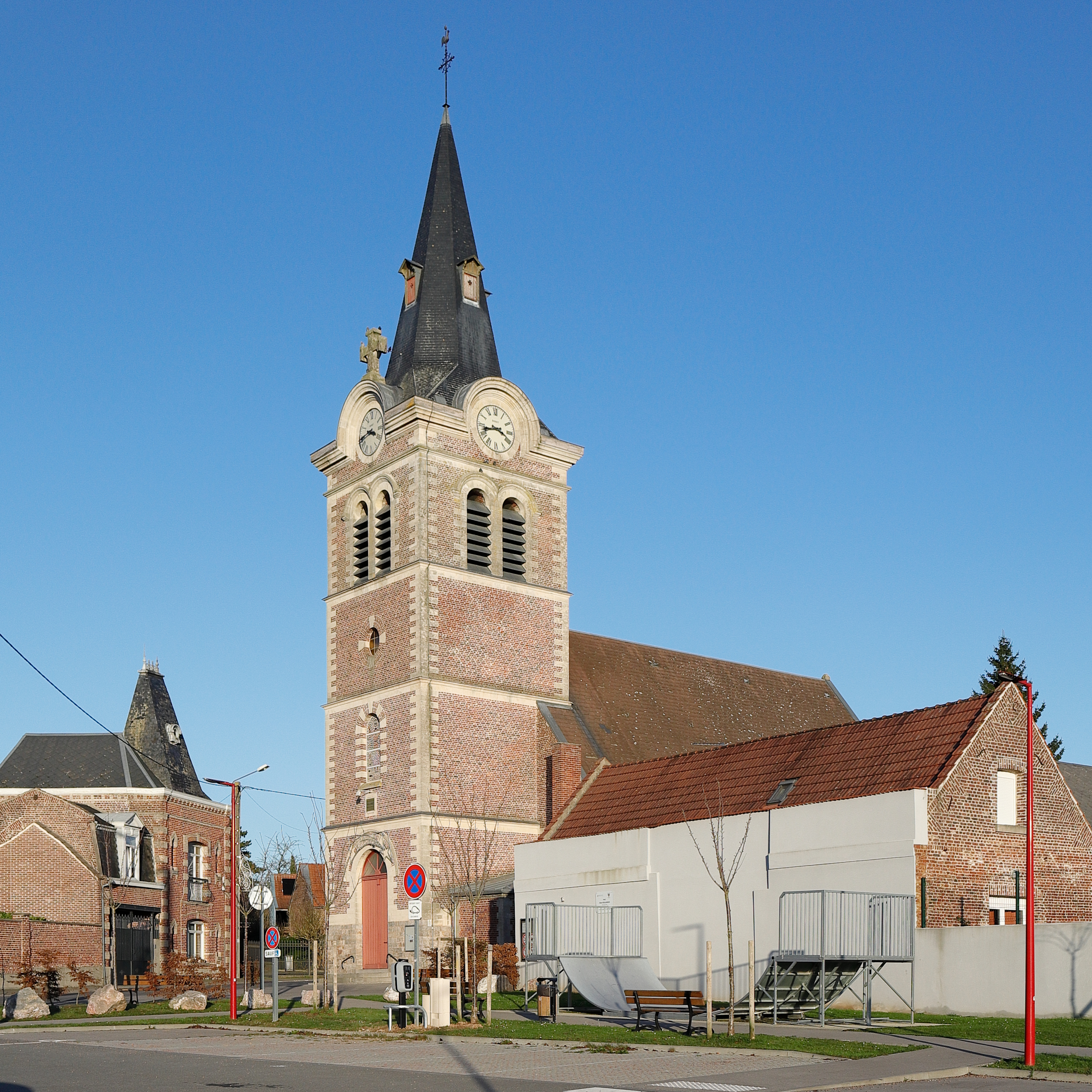
Saint-Amand Church

== Population ==
Historical population
Year	Pop.	±% p.a.
1968	1,063	—
1975	1,077	+0.19%
1982	1,022	−0.75%
1990	1,018	−0.05%
1999	1,048	+0.32%
2007	1,086	+0.45%
2012	1,217	+2.30%
2017	1,178	−0.65%
2023	1,143	−0.50%
Source: INSEE

== Heraldry ==
Arms of Aubigny-au-Bac	The arms of Aubigny-au-Bac are blazoned : Azure, 3 chevrons Or.

== See also ==
- Communes of the Nord department
