= Brunémont =

- Commune
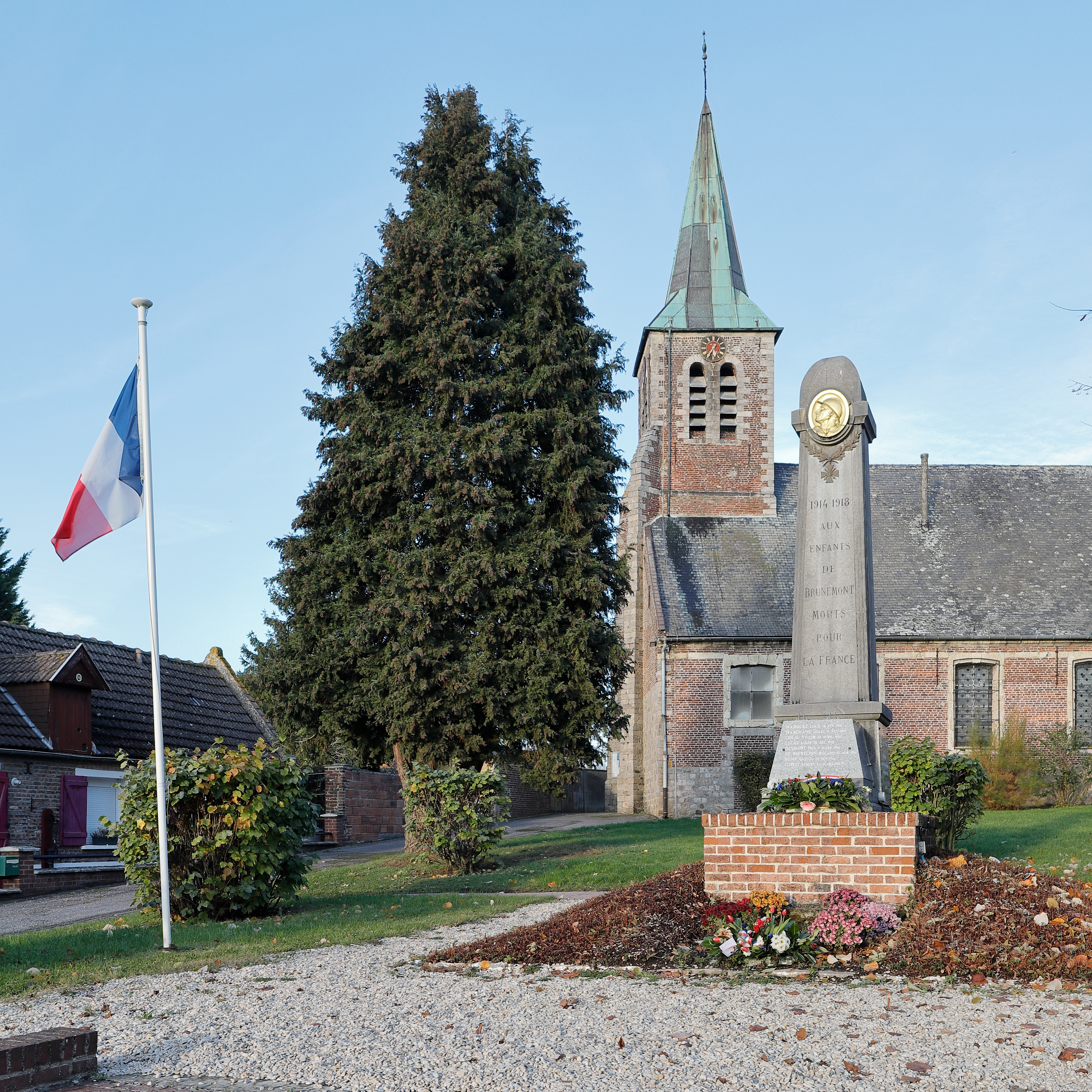
- A view within Brunémont

- Coat of arms
- Location of Brunémont
- Location within France Location within Hauts-de-France
- Coordinates: 50°16′25″N 3°08′23″E
- Country: France
- Region: Hauts-de-France
- Department: Nord
- Arrondissement: Douai
- Canton: Aniche
- Intercommunality: Douaisis Agglo

Government
  - Mayor (2020–2026): Alain Dupont
- Area^{1}: 1.95 km^{2} (0.75 sq mi)
- Elevation: 38 m (125 ft)
- Highest elevation: 53 m (174 ft)
- Lowest elevation: 34 m (112 ft)
- Population (2023): 704
  - Density: 361/km^{2} (935/sq mi)
- Time zone: UTC+01:00 (CET)
  - Summer (DST): UTC+02:00 (CEST)
- INSEE/Postal code: 59115 /59151
- ^{1} French Land Register data, which excludes lakes, ponds, glaciers > 1 km^{2} (0.386 sq mi or 247 acres) and river estuaries.

Brunémont (French pronunciation: [bʁynemɔ̃]) is a commune in the Nord department in northern France.

== Population ==
Historical population
Year	Pop.	±% p.a.
1968	372	—
1975	390	+0.68%
1982	355	−1.33%
1990	376	+0.72%
1999	408	+0.91%
2007	545	+3.69%
2012	694	+4.95%
2017	711	+0.49%
2023	704	−0.16%
Source: INSEE

== Heraldry ==
Arms of Brunémont	The arms of Brunémont are blazoned : Barry argent and azure, in chief on the first blue bit, 3 hearts Or.

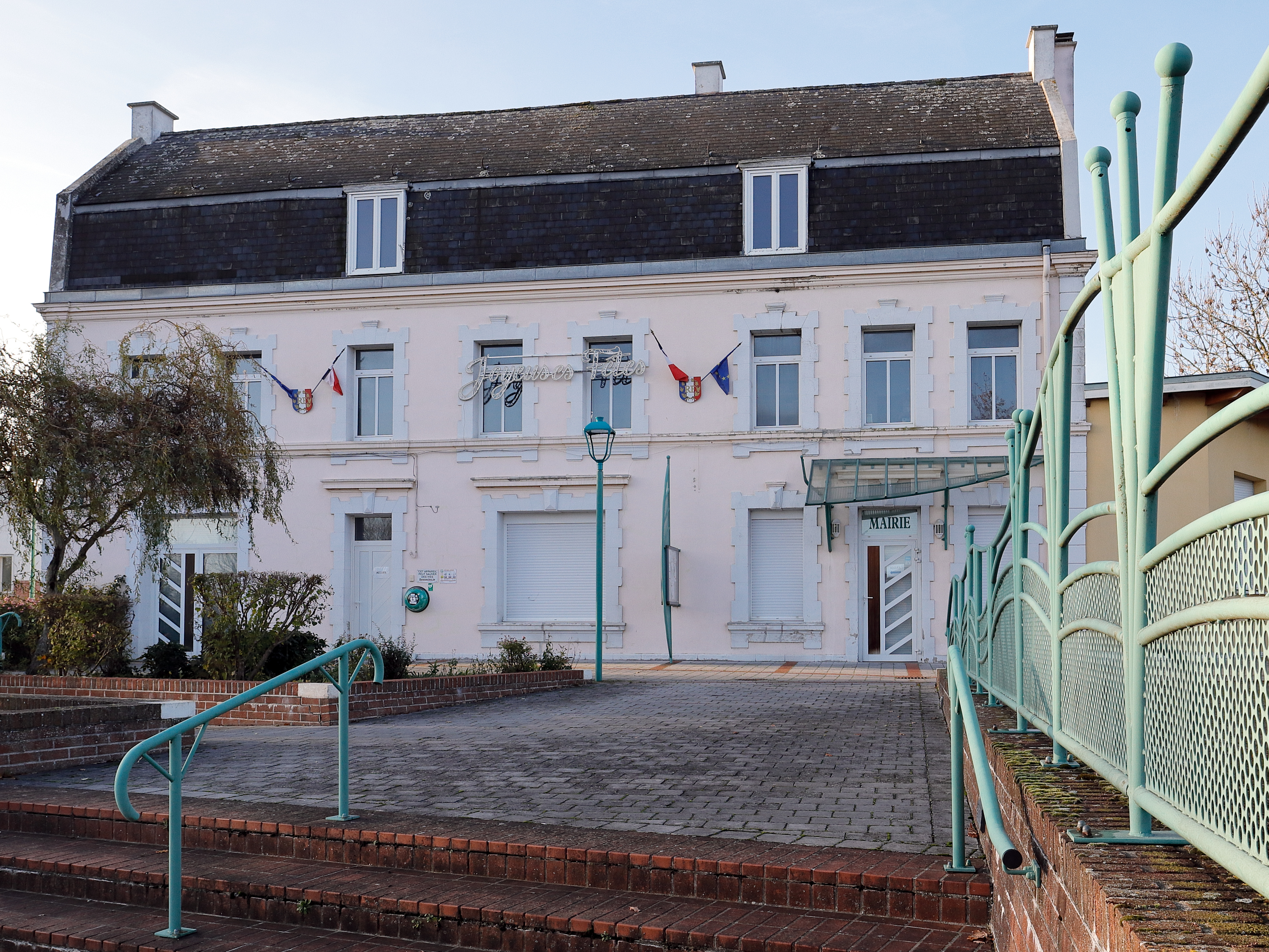
The town hall

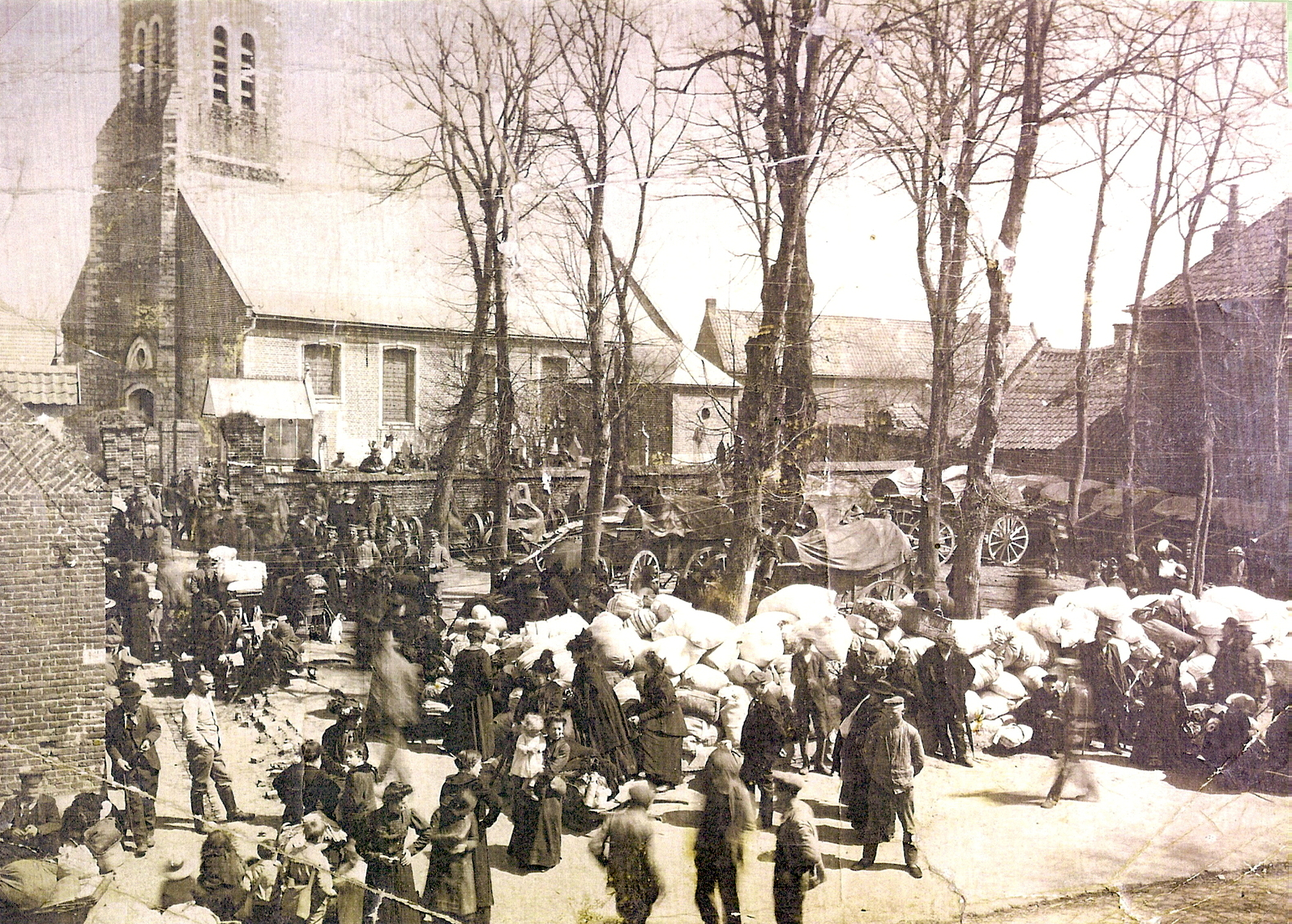
1917 - Evacuation of the village to Belgium

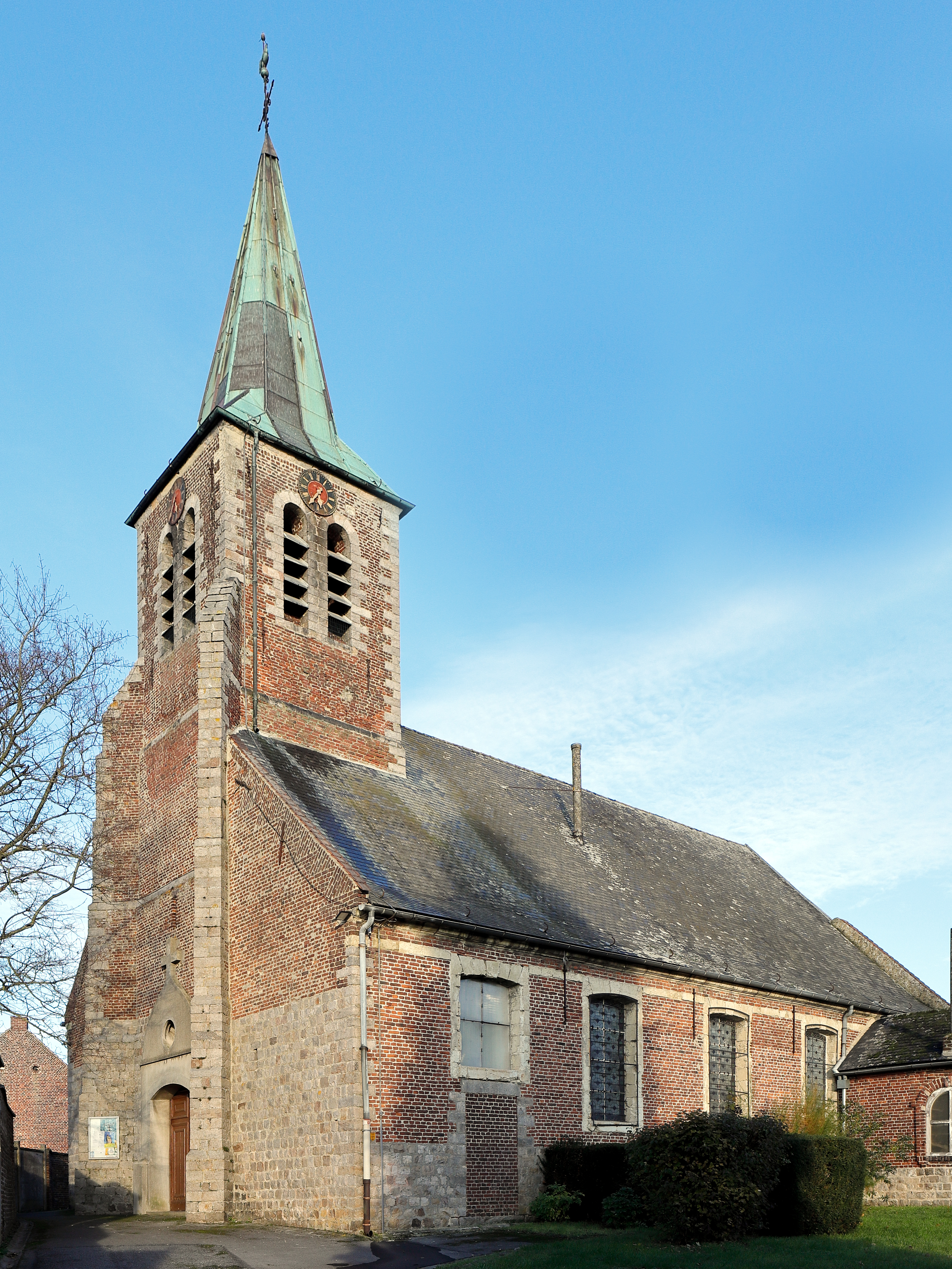
The church from the 18th and 19th centuries

== See also ==
- Communes of the Nord department
