= Douaisis Agglo =

- Communauté d'agglomération
- Interactive map of Douaisis Agglo
- Coordinates: 50°22′N 03°05′E
- Country: France
- Region: Hauts-de-France
- Department: Nord
- No. of communes: {{{nbcomm}}}
- Established: 2014
- Area: 235.7 km^{2} (91.0 sq mi)
- Population (2019): 148,784
  - Density: 631.2/km^{2} (1,635/sq mi)
- Website: www.douaisis-agglo.com

Douaisis Agglo (before 2019: Communauté d'agglomération du Douaisis) is the communauté d'agglomération, an intercommunal structure, centred on the city of Douai. It is located in the Nord department, in the Hauts-de-France region, northern France. It was created in January 2014. Its seat is in Douai. Its area is 235.7 km^{2}. Its population was 148,784 in 2019, of which 39,613 in Douai proper.

== Composition ==
The communauté d'agglomération consists of the following 35 communes:

1. Anhiers
2. Arleux
3. Aubigny-au-Bac
4. Auby
5. Brunémont
6. Bugnicourt
7. Cantin
8. Courchelettes
9. Cuincy
10. Dechy
11. Douai
12. Erchin
13. Esquerchin
14. Estrées
15. Faumont
16. Féchain
17. Férin
18. Flers-en-Escrebieux
19. Flines-lez-Raches
20. Fressain
21. Gœulzin
22. Guesnain
23. Hamel
24. Lallaing
25. Lambres-lez-Douai
26. Lauwin-Planque
27. Lécluse
28. Marcq-en-Ostrevent
29. Râches
30. Raimbeaucourt
31. Roost-Warendin
32. Roucourt
33. Sin-le-Noble
34. Villers-au-Tertre
35. Waziers
