= Roost-Warendin =

- Commune
- Château de Bernicourt

- Coat of arms
- Location of Roost-Warendin
- Location within France Location within Hauts-de-France
- Coordinates: 50°25′16″N 3°06′22″E
- Country: France
- Region: Hauts-de-France
- Department: Nord
- Arrondissement: Douai
- Canton: Orchies
- Intercommunality: Douaisis Agglo

Government
  - Mayor (2020–2026): Lionel Courdavault
- Area^{1}: 7.16 km^{2} (2.76 sq mi)
- Elevation: 21 m (69 ft)
- Highest elevation: 27 m (89 ft)
- Lowest elevation: 18 m (59 ft)
- Population (2023): 5,956
  - Density: 832/km^{2} (2,150/sq mi)
- Time zone: UTC+01:00 (CET)
  - Summer (DST): UTC+02:00 (CEST)
- INSEE/Postal code: 59509 /59286
- ^{1} French Land Register data, which excludes lakes, ponds, glaciers > 1 km^{2} (0.386 sq mi or 247 acres) and river estuaries.

Roost-Warendin (French pronunciation: [ʁo vaʁɑ̃dɛ̃]) is a commune in the Nord department in northern France.

== Population ==
Historical population
Year	Pop.	±% p.a.
1968	6,292	—
1975	6,356	+0.14%
1982	6,439	+0.19%
1990	6,413	−0.05%
1999	5,744	−1.22%
2007	6,157	+0.87%
2012	6,178	+0.07%
2017	6,141	−0.12%
2023	5,956	−0.51%
Source: INSEE

== Twin towns ==
Roost-Warendin is twinned with:

- Haltern am See, Germany

== Heraldry ==
Arms of Roost-Warendin	The arms of Roost-Warendin are blazoned : Sable semy de lys Or.

== See also ==
- Communes of the Nord department
