= Gœulzin =

- Commune
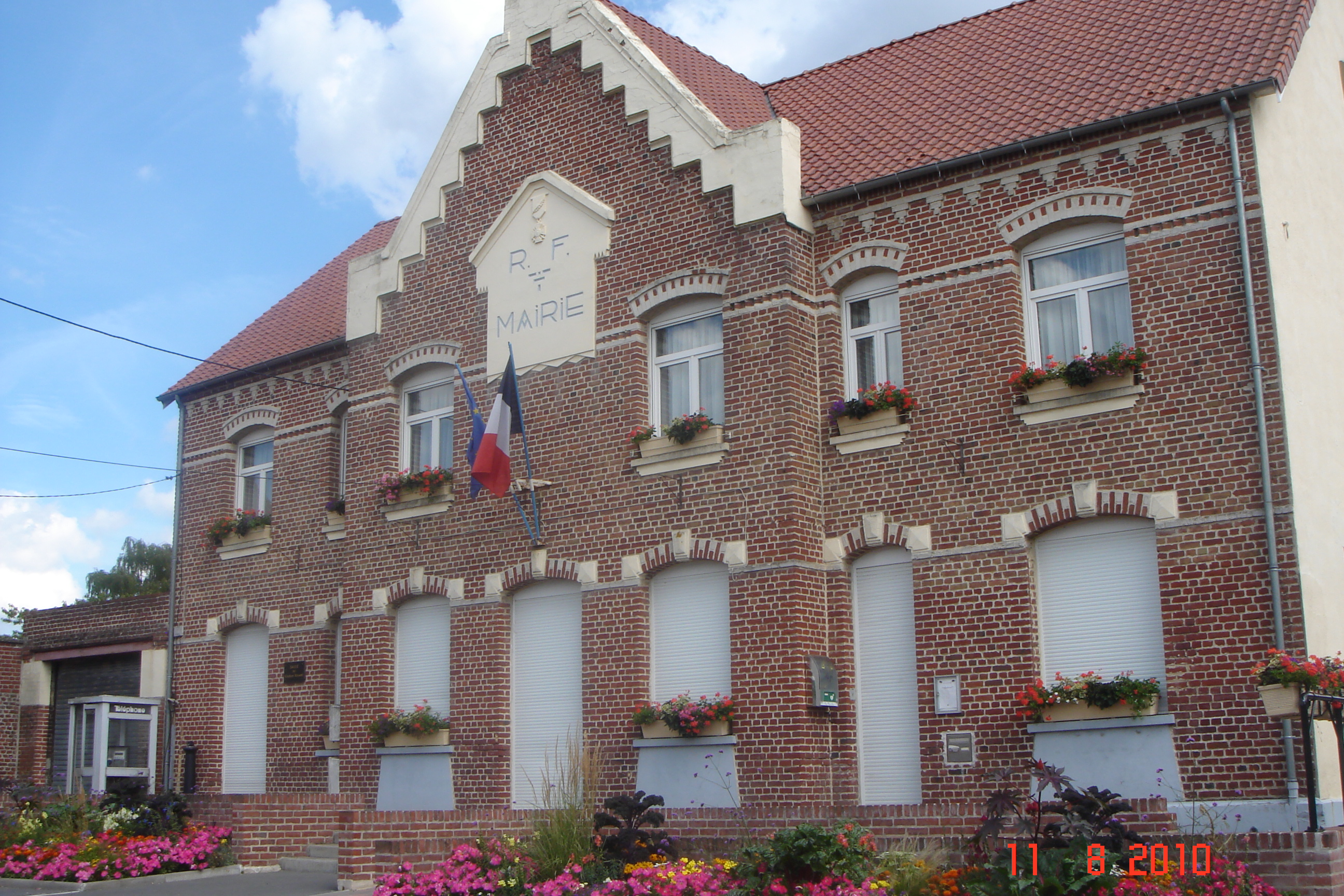
- The town hall in Gœulzin

- Coat of arms
- Location of Gœulzin
- Location within France Location within Hauts-de-France
- Coordinates: 50°19′05″N 3°05′42″E
- Country: France
- Region: Hauts-de-France
- Department: Nord
- Arrondissement: Douai
- Canton: Aniche
- Intercommunality: Douaisis Agglo

Government
  - Mayor (2020–2026): Francis Fustin
- Area^{1}: 4.79 km^{2} (1.85 sq mi)
- Elevation: 37 m (121 ft)
- Highest elevation: 57 m (187 ft)
- Lowest elevation: 31 m (102 ft)
- Population (2023): 1,070
  - Density: 223/km^{2} (579/sq mi)
- Time zone: UTC+01:00 (CET)
  - Summer (DST): UTC+02:00 (CEST)
- INSEE/Postal code: 59263 /59169
- ^{1} French Land Register data, which excludes lakes, ponds, glaciers > 1 km^{2} (0.386 sq mi or 247 acres) and river estuaries.

Gœulzin (French pronunciation: [ɡœlzɛ̃]) is a commune in the Nord department in northern France.

== Heraldry ==
Arms of Gœulzin	The arms of Gœulzin are blazoned : Gules, a pall ermine.

== See also ==
- Communes of the Nord department
