= Arleux =

- Commune
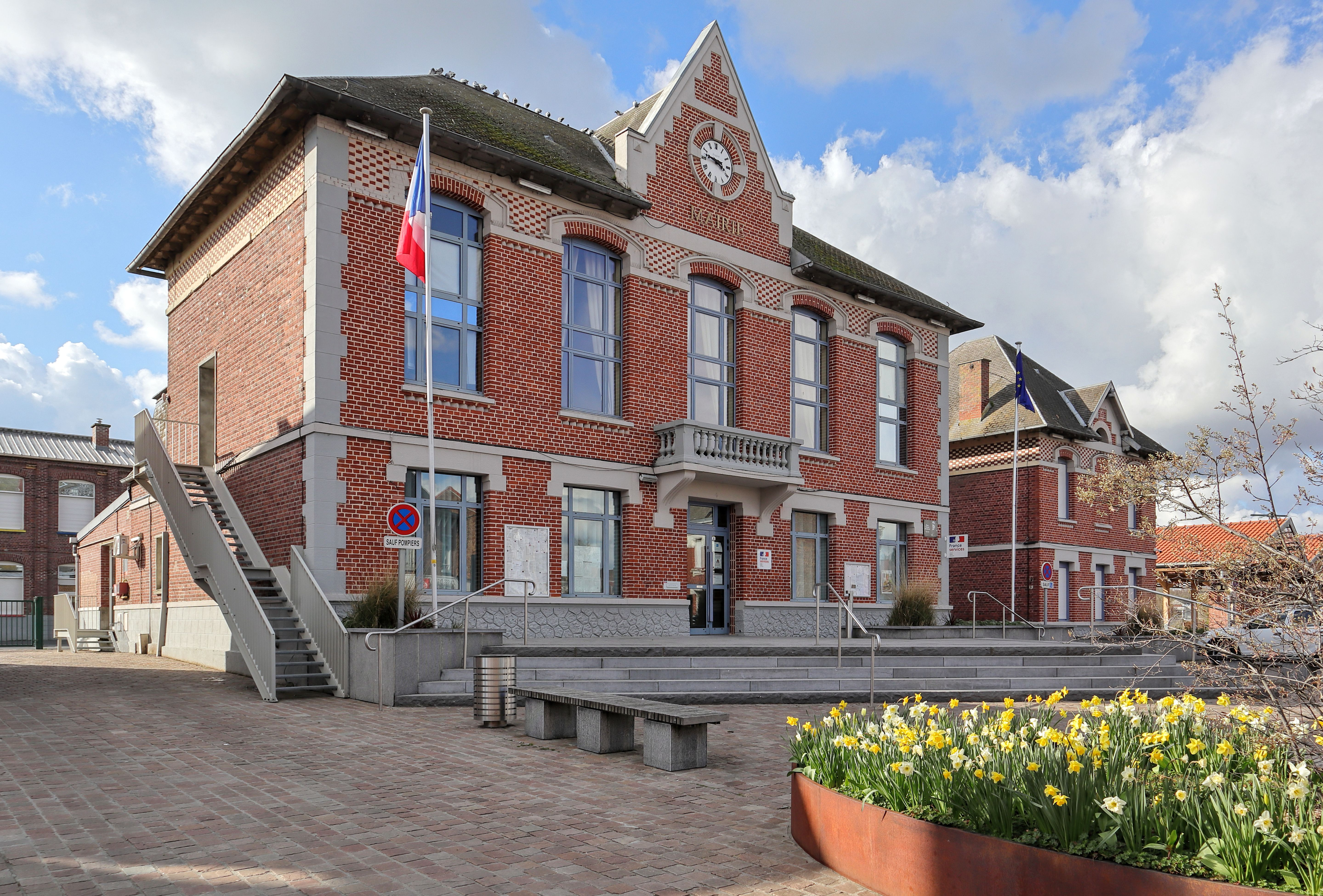
- The town hall in Arleux

- Coat of arms
- Location of Arleux
- Location within France Location within Hauts-de-France
- Coordinates: 50°16′51″N 3°06′25″E
- Country: France
- Region: Hauts-de-France
- Department: Nord
- Arrondissement: Douai
- Canton: Aniche
- Intercommunality: Douaisis Agglo

Government
  - Mayor (2020–2026): Bruno Vandeville
- Area^{1}: 11.10 km^{2} (4.29 sq mi)
- Highest elevation: 71 m (233 ft)
- Lowest elevation: 32 m (105 ft)
- Population (2023): 3,125
  - Density: 281.5/km^{2} (729.2/sq mi)
- Time zone: UTC+01:00 (CET)
  - Summer (DST): UTC+02:00 (CEST)
- INSEE/Postal code: 59015 /59151
- ^{1} French Land Register data, which excludes lakes, ponds, glaciers > 1 km^{2} (0.386 sq mi or 247 acres) and river estuaries.

Arleux (French pronunciation: [aʁlø]) is a commune in the Nord département in northern France.

== Geography ==
The river Sensée joins the Canal du Nord at Arleux.

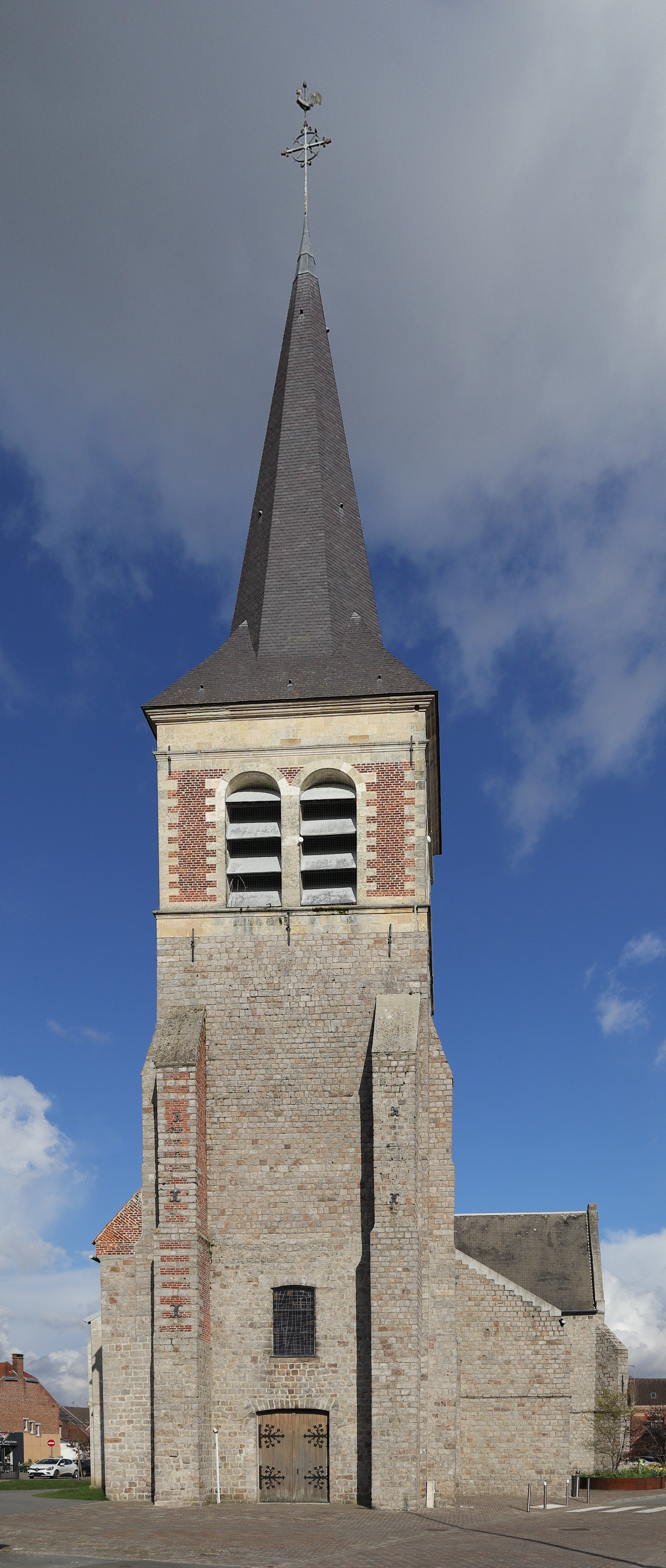
Saint Nicholas Church

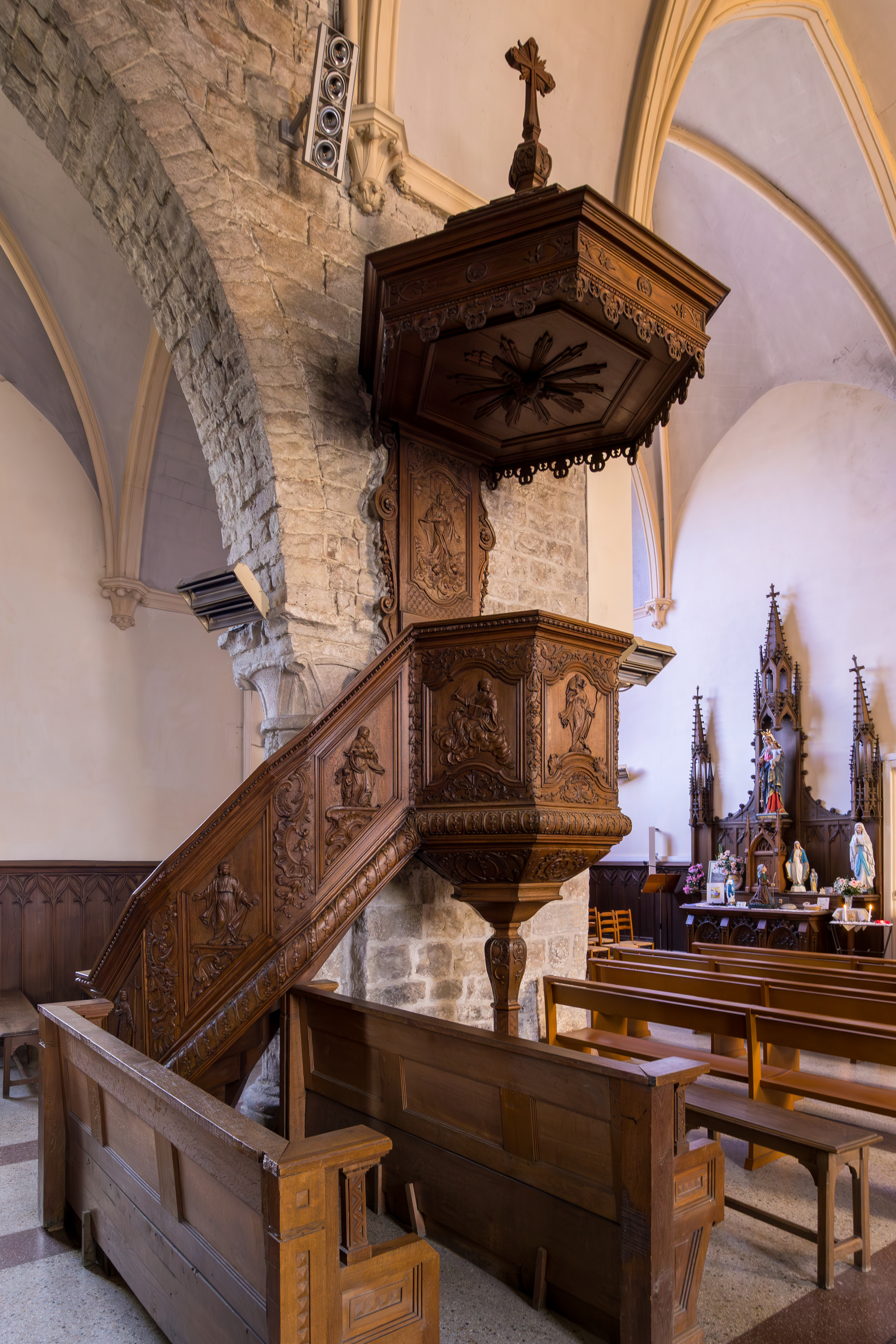

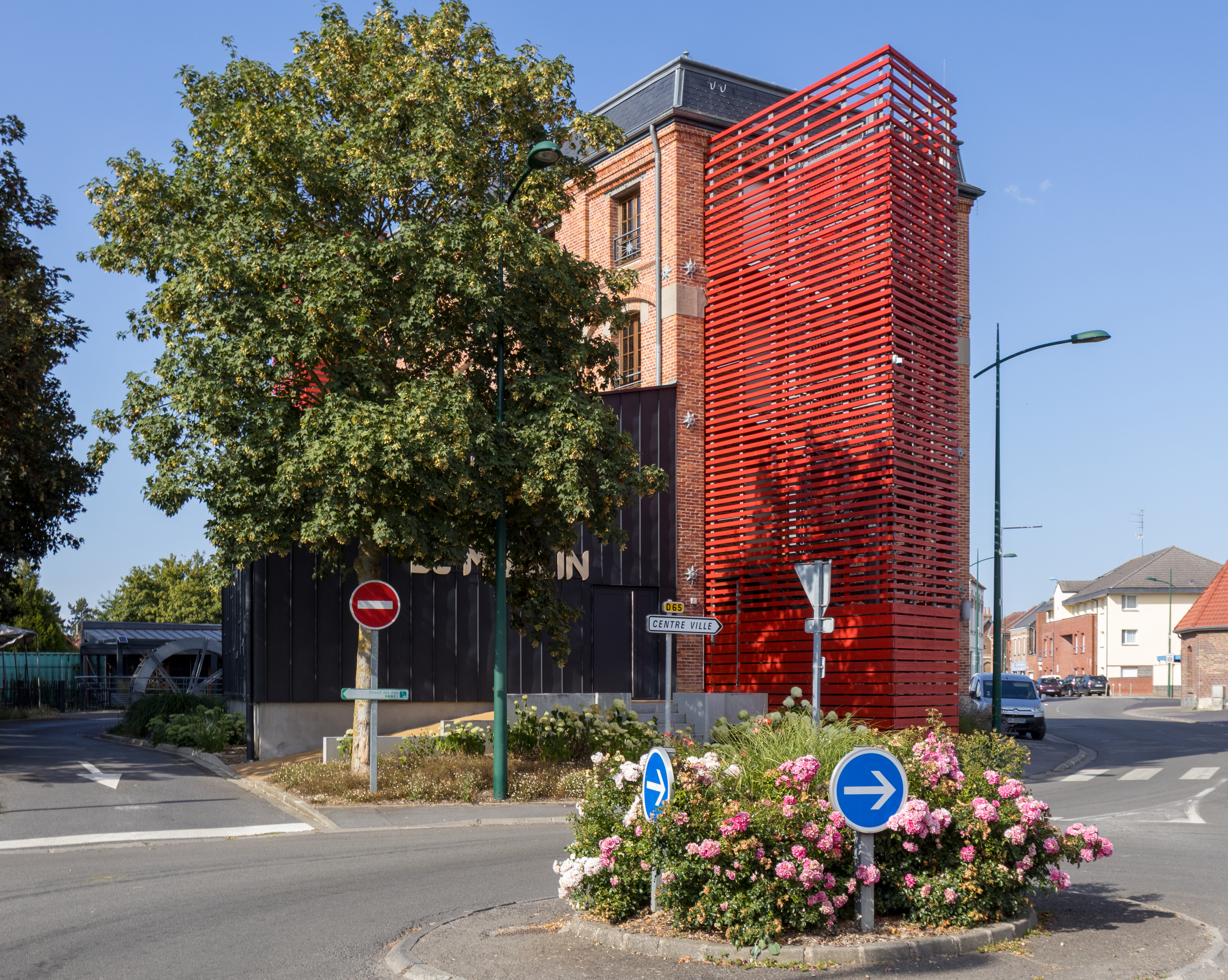
Le Moulin - Patrick Masclet Cultural Center

== Population ==
Historical population

Year	Pop.	±% p.a.
1793	1,535	—
1821	1,839	+0.65%
1846	1,685	−0.35%
1872	1,675	−0.02%
1901	1,639	−0.07%
1926	1,622	−0.04%
1946	1,789	+0.49%
1962	1,961	+0.58%
1968	2,214	+2.04%

Year	Pop.	±% p.a.
1975	2,225	+0.07%
1982	2,605	+2.28%
1990	2,656	+0.24%
1999	2,567	−0.38%
2007	2,435	−0.66%
2012	2,982	+4.14%
2017	3,219	+1.54%
2023	3,125	−0.49%

Source: EHESS and INSEE (1968-2023)

== Heraldry ==
Arms of Arleux	The arms of Arleux are blazoned : Argent, 3 towers gules.

== See also ==
- Communes of the Nord department
