= Canton of Aniche =

Coordinates: 50.33°N 3.25°E

The canton of Aniche is an administrative division of the Nord department, northern France. It was created at the French canton reorganisation which came into effect in March 2015. Its seat is in Aniche.

It consists of the following communes:

1. Aniche
2. Arleux
3. Auberchicourt
4. Aubigny-au-Bac
5. Brunémont
6. Bugnicourt
7. Cantin
8. Dechy
9. Écaillon
10. Erchin
11. Estrées
12. Féchain
13. Férin
14. Fressain
15. Gœulzin
16. Guesnain
17. Hamel
18. Lécluse
19. Lewarde
20. Loffre
21. Marcq-en-Ostrevent
22. Masny
23. Monchecourt
24. Montigny-en-Ostrevent
25. Roucourt
26. Villers-au-Tertre
