= Cantin =

- Commune
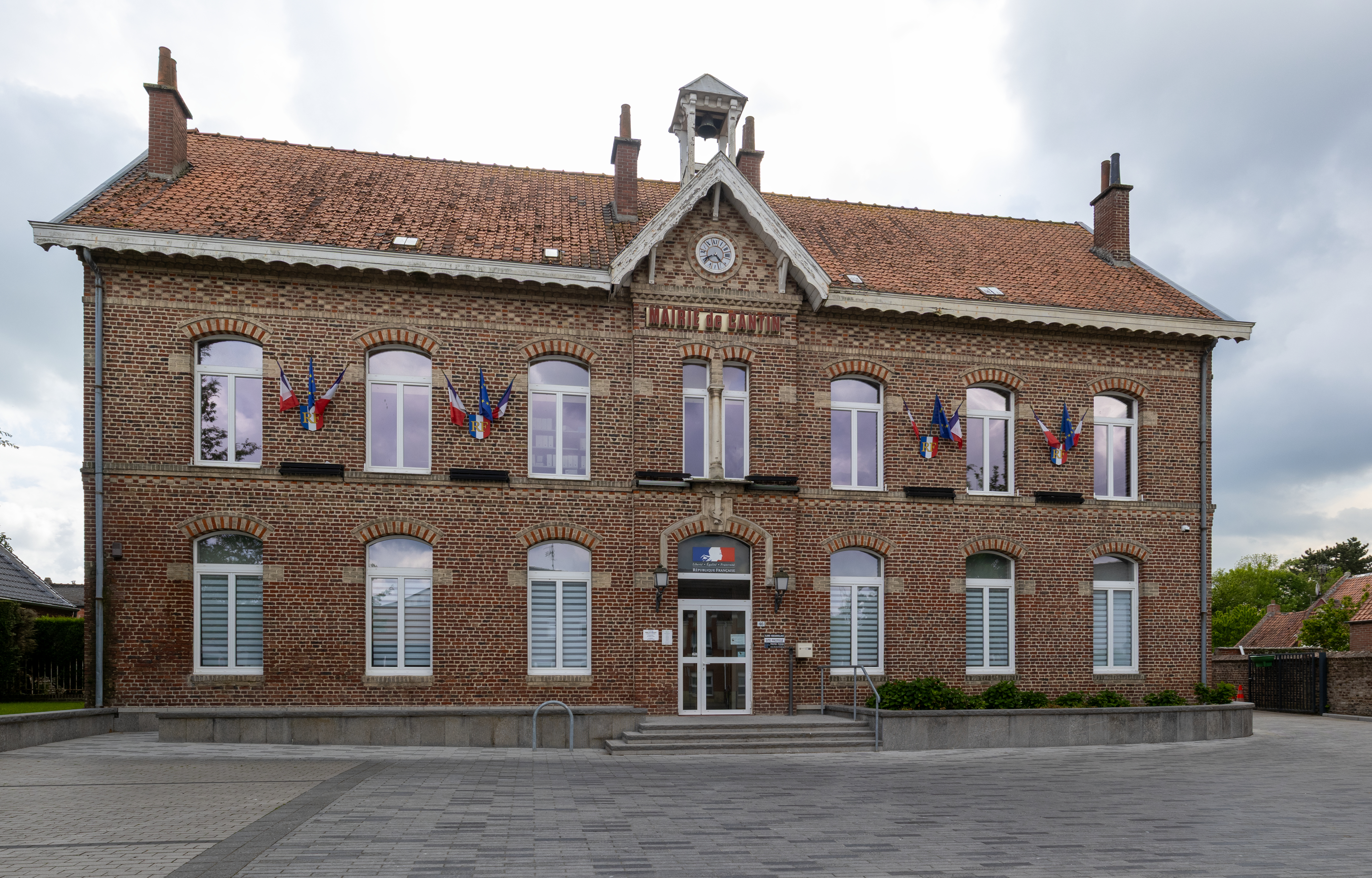
- The town hall in Cantin

- Coat of arms
- Location of Cantin
- Location within France Location within Hauts-de-France
- Coordinates: 50°19′N 3°07′E
- Country: France
- Region: Hauts-de-France
- Department: Nord
- Arrondissement: Douai
- Canton: Aniche
- Intercommunality: Douaisis Agglo

Government
  - Mayor (2020–2026): Lucie Vaillant
- Area^{1}: 9.32 km^{2} (3.60 sq mi)
- Elevation: 58 m (190 ft)
- Highest elevation: 76 m (249 ft)
- Lowest elevation: 37 m (121 ft)
- Population (2023): 1,741
  - Density: 187/km^{2} (484/sq mi)
- Time zone: UTC+01:00 (CET)
  - Summer (DST): UTC+02:00 (CEST)
- INSEE/Postal code: 59126 /59169
- ^{1} French Land Register data, which excludes lakes, ponds, glaciers > 1 km^{2} (0.386 sq mi or 247 acres) and river estuaries.

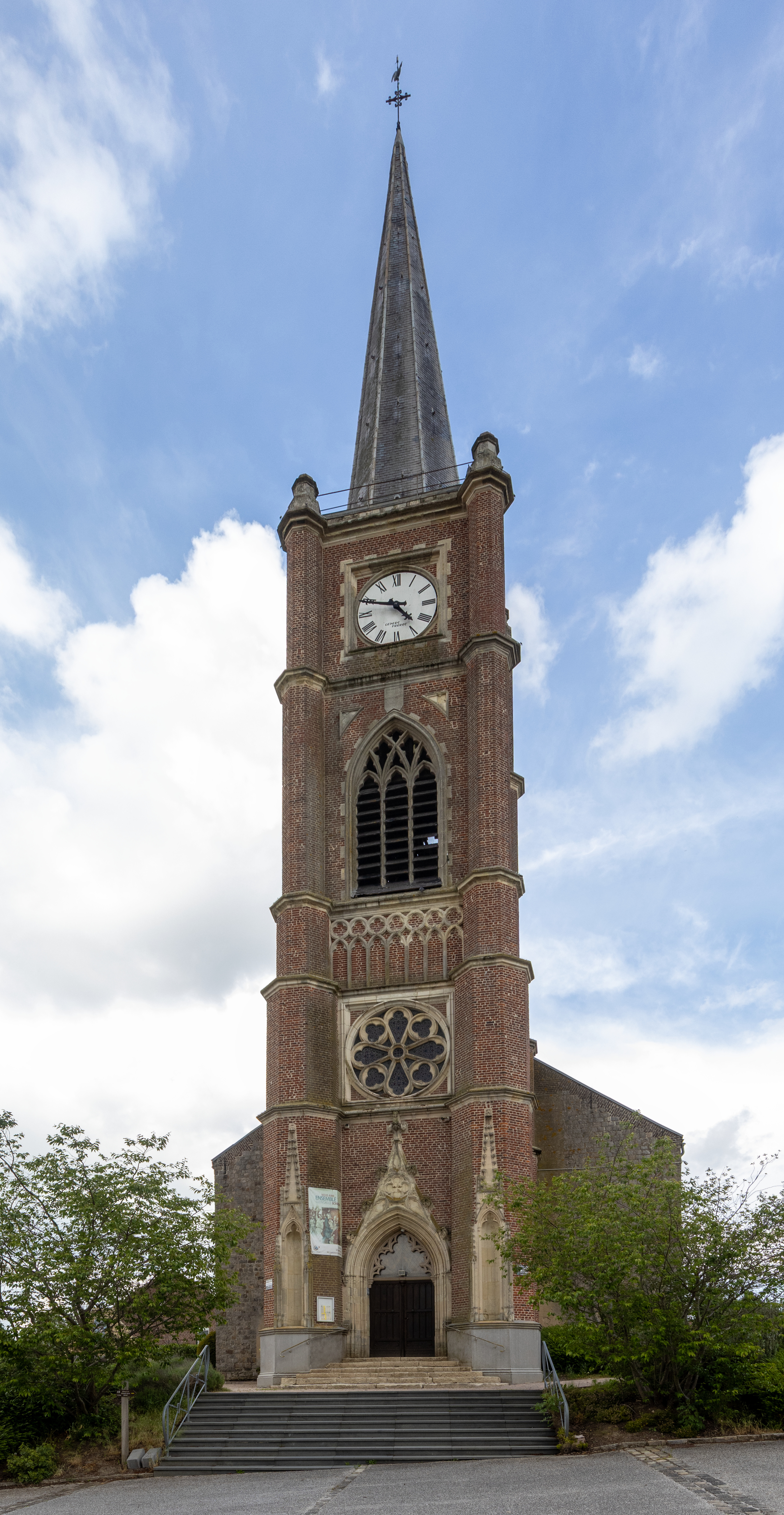
The church Saint-Martin

Cantin (French pronunciation: [kɑ̃tɛ̃]) is a commune of the Hauts-de-France region in the Nord department in northern France.

It is 8 km (5.0 mi) southeast of Douai.

== Population ==
Historical population
Year	Pop.	±% p.a.
1968	1,246	—
1975	1,395	+1.63%
1982	1,397	+0.02%
1990	1,373	−0.22%
1999	1,328	−0.37%
2007	1,449	+1.10%
2012	1,499	+0.68%
2017	1,577	+1.02%
2023	1,741	+1.66%
Source: INSEE

== Heraldry ==
Arms of Cantin	The arms of Cantin are blazoned : Vert, in dexter base an eagle volant bendwise argent and in canton a sun Or.

== See also ==
- Communes of the Nord department
