= Courchelettes =

- Commune
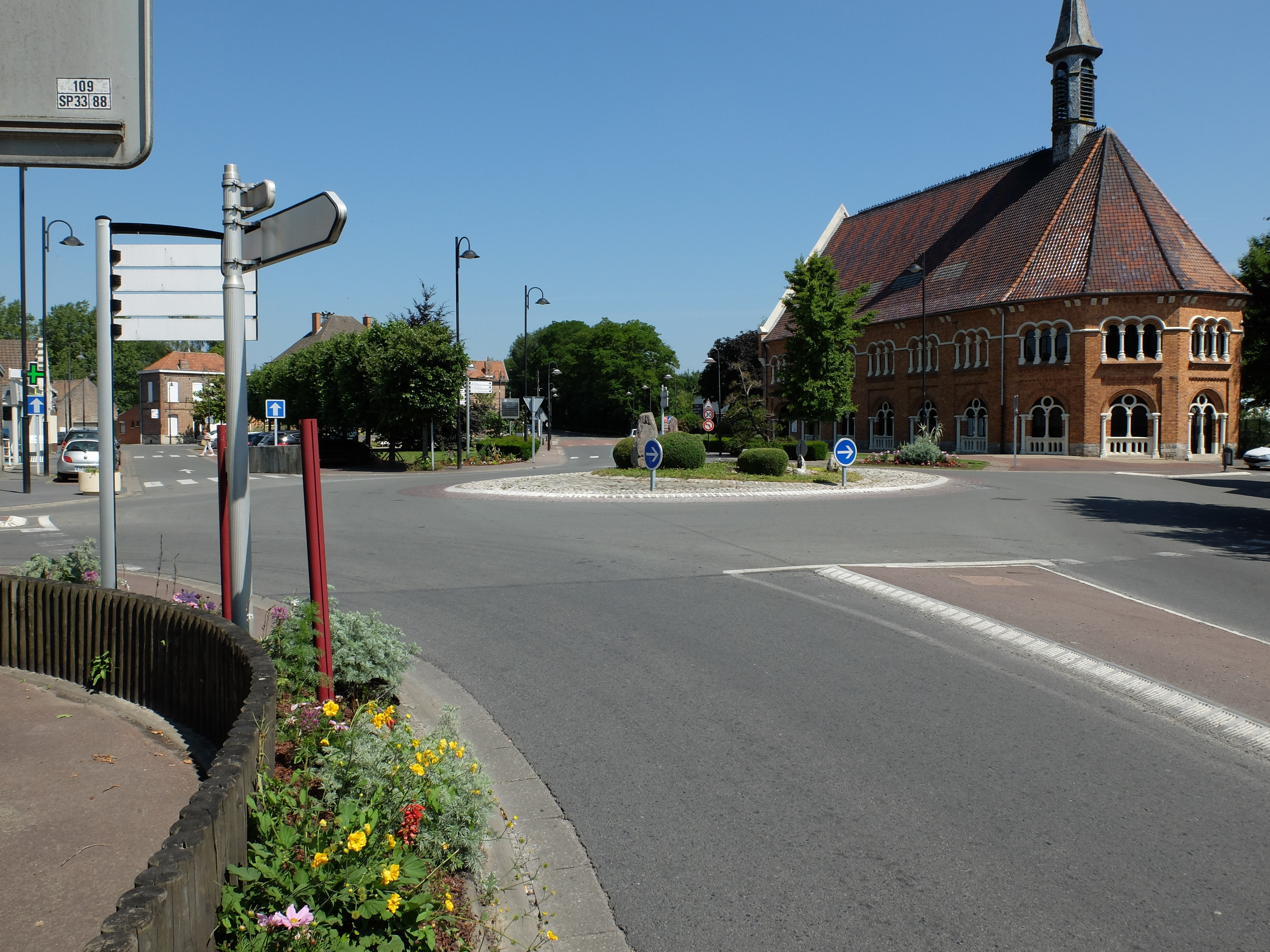
- Location of Courchelettes within the Arrondissement of Douai

- Coat of arms
- Location of Courchelettes
- Location within France Location within Hauts-de-France
- Coordinates: 50°20′N 3°04′E
- Country: France
- Region: Hauts-de-France
- Department: Nord
- Arrondissement: Douai
- Canton: Douai
- Intercommunality: Douaisis Agglo

Government
  - Mayor (2020–2026): Raphaël Aix
- Area^{1}: 1.67 km^{2} (0.64 sq mi)
- Elevation: 33 m (108 ft)
- Highest elevation: 34 m (112 ft)
- Lowest elevation: 26 m (85 ft)
- Population (2023): 2,855
  - Density: 1,710/km^{2} (4,430/sq mi)
- Time zone: UTC+01:00 (CET)
  - Summer (DST): UTC+02:00 (CEST)
- INSEE/Postal code: 59156 /59552
- ^{1} French Land Register data, which excludes lakes, ponds, glaciers > 1 km^{2} (0.386 sq mi or 247 acres) and river estuaries.

Courchelettes (French pronunciation: [kuʁʃəlɛt]) is a commune of the Nord department in northern France.

== Population ==
Historical population
Year	Pop.	±% p.a.
1968	2,270	—
1975	2,572	+1.80%
1982	2,986	+2.16%
1990	3,018	+0.13%
1999	2,851	−0.63%
2007	2,790	−0.27%
2012	2,706	−0.61%
2017	2,809	+0.75%
2023	2,855	+0.27%
Source: INSEE

== Heraldry ==
Arms of Courchelettes	The arms of Courchelettes are blazoned : Azure, a chevron between 3 mullets of 5 points Or.

== See also ==
- Communes of the Nord department
