= Arrondissement of Douai =

Coordinates: 50°22′N 3°05′E

Douai Dowaai
- Arrondissement
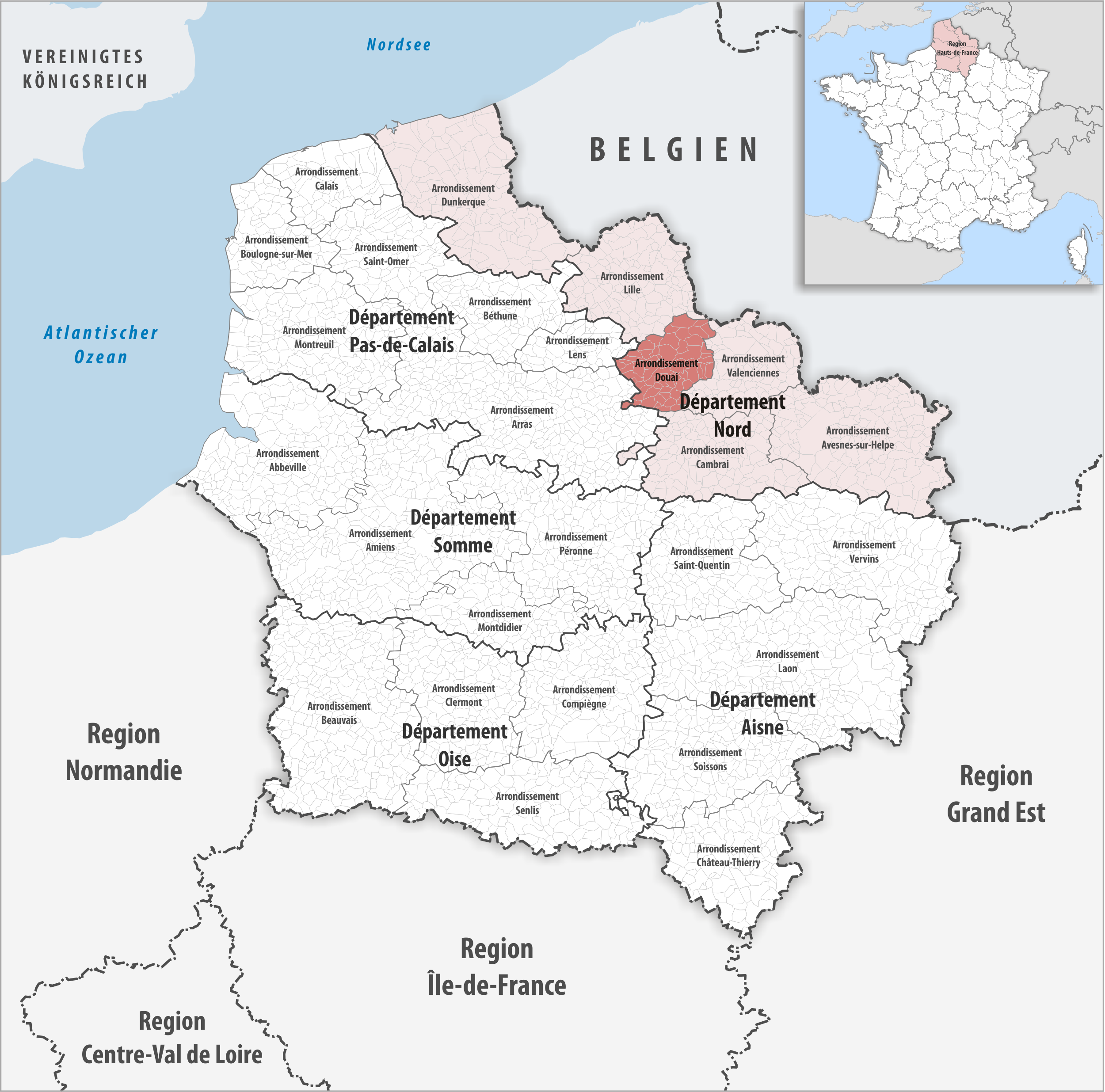
- Location within the region Hauts-de-France
- Country: France
- Region: Hauts-de-France
- Department: Nord
- No. of communes: {{{nbcomm}}}
- Area: 476.6 km^{2} (184.0 sq mi)
- Population (2023): 245,129
  - Density: 514.3/km^{2} (1,332/sq mi)
- INSEE code: 593

The arrondissement of Douai (West Flemish: Dowaai) is an arrondissement of France in the Nord department in the Hauts-de-France region. It has 64 communes. Its population is 244,710 (2021), and its area is 476.6 km^{2} (184.0 sq mi).

== Composition ==
The communes of the arrondissement of Douai, and their INSEE codes, are:

1. Aix-en-Pévèle (59004)
2. Anhiers (59007)
3. Aniche (59008)
4. Arleux (59015)
5. Auberchicourt (59024)
6. Aubigny-au-Bac (59026)
7. Auby (59028)
8. Auchy-lez-Orchies (59029)
9. Beuvry-la-Forêt (59080)
10. Bouvignies (59105)
11. Bruille-lez-Marchiennes (59113)
12. Brunémont (59115)
13. Bugnicourt (59117)
14. Cantin (59126)
15. Courchelettes (59156)
16. Coutiches (59158)
17. Cuincy (59165)
18. Dechy (59170)
19. Douai (59178)
20. Écaillon (59185)
21. Erchin (59199)
22. Erre (59203)
23. Esquerchin (59211)
24. Estrées (59214)
25. Faumont (59222)
26. Féchain (59224)
27. Fenain (59227)
28. Férin (59228)
29. Flers-en-Escrebieux (59234)
30. Flines-lez-Raches (59239)
31. Fressain (59254)
32. Gœulzin (59263)
33. Guesnain (59276)
34. Hamel (59280)
35. Hornaing (59314)
36. Lallaing (59327)
37. Lambres-lez-Douai (59329)
38. Landas (59330)
39. Lauwin-Planque (59334)
40. Lécluse (59336)
41. Lewarde (59345)
42. Loffre (59354)
43. Marchiennes (59375)
44. Marcq-en-Ostrevent (59379)
45. Masny (59390)
46. Monchecourt (59409)
47. Montigny-en-Ostrevent (59414)
48. Nomain (59435)
49. Orchies (59449)
50. Pecquencourt (59456)
51. Râches (59486)
52. Raimbeaucourt (59489)
53. Rieulay (59501)
54. Roost-Warendin (59509)
55. Roucourt (59513)
56. Saméon (59551)
57. Sin-le-Noble (59569)
58. Somain (59574)
59. Tilloy-lez-Marchiennes (59596)
60. Villers-au-Tertre (59620)
61. Vred (59629)
62. Wandignies-Hamage (59637)
63. Warlaing (59642)
64. Waziers (59654)

== History ==
The arrondissement of Douai was created in 1800.

As a result of the reorganisation of the cantons of France which came into effect in 2015, the borders of the cantons are no longer related to the borders of the arrondissements. The cantons of the arrondissement of Douai were, as of January 2015:

1. Arleux
2. Douai-Nord
3. Douai-Nord-Est
4. Douai-Sud
5. Douai-Sud-Ouest
6. Marchiennes
7. Orchies

== Sub-prefects ==
- Joseph Masclet (1 Vendémiaire an XII, 24 September 1803)
