= Marcq-en-Ostrevent =

- Commune
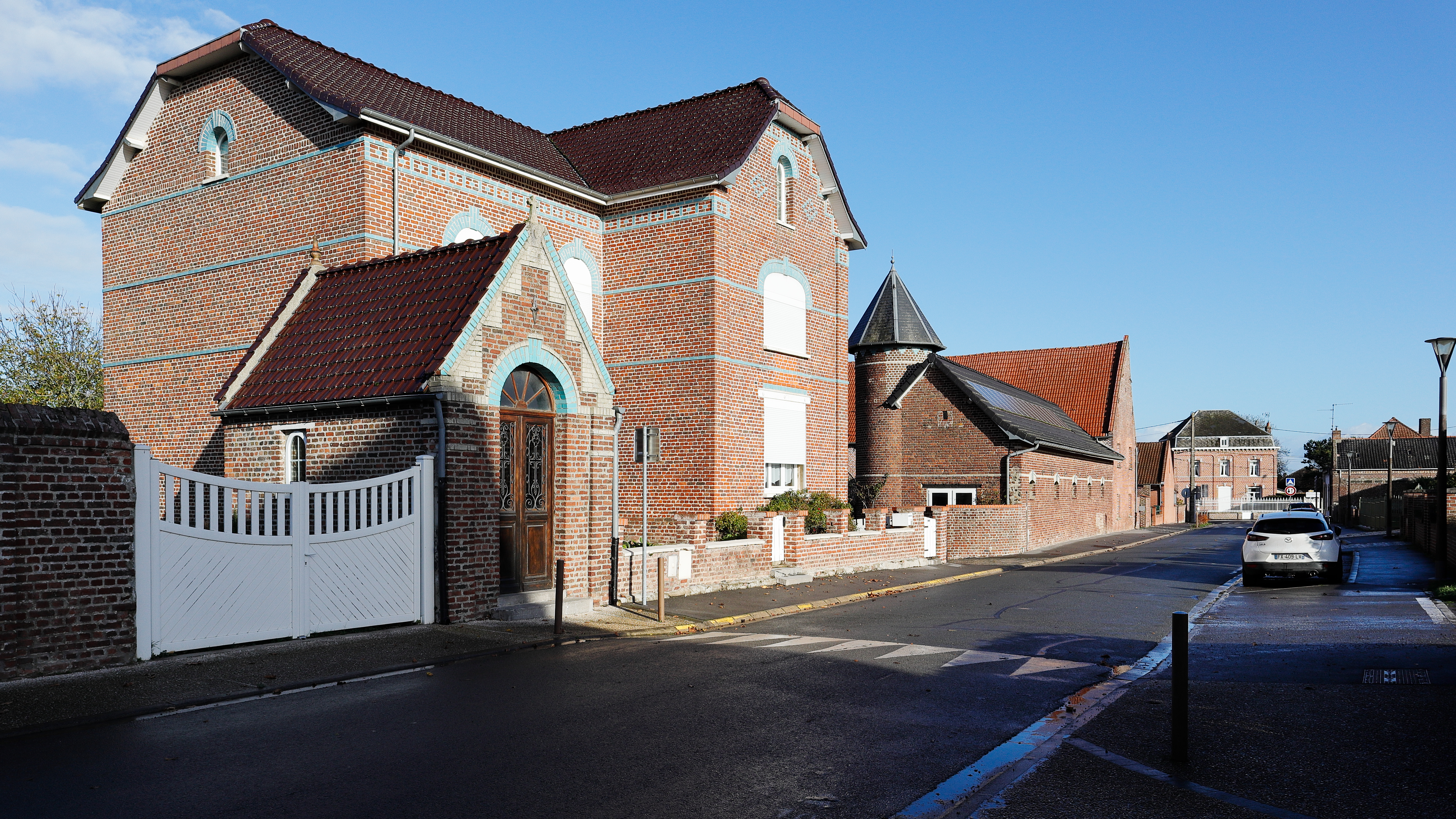
- A view within Marcq-en-Ostrevent

- Coat of arms
- Location of Marcq-en-Ostrevent
- Location within France Location within Hauts-de-France
- Coordinates: 50°17′16″N 3°14′15″E
- Country: France
- Region: Hauts-de-France
- Department: Nord
- Arrondissement: Douai
- Canton: Aniche
- Intercommunality: Douaisis Agglo

Government
  - Mayor (2020–2026): Thierry Prein
- Area^{1}: 6.27 km^{2} (2.42 sq mi)
- Elevation: 45 m (148 ft)
- Highest elevation: 69 m (226 ft)
- Lowest elevation: 38 m (125 ft)
- Population (2023): 741
  - Density: 118/km^{2} (306/sq mi)
- Time zone: UTC+01:00 (CET)
  - Summer (DST): UTC+02:00 (CEST)
- INSEE/Postal code: 59379 /59252
- ^{1} French Land Register data, which excludes lakes, ponds, glaciers > 1 km^{2} (0.386 sq mi or 247 acres) and river estuaries.

Marcq-en-Ostrevent is a commune in the Nord department in northern France.

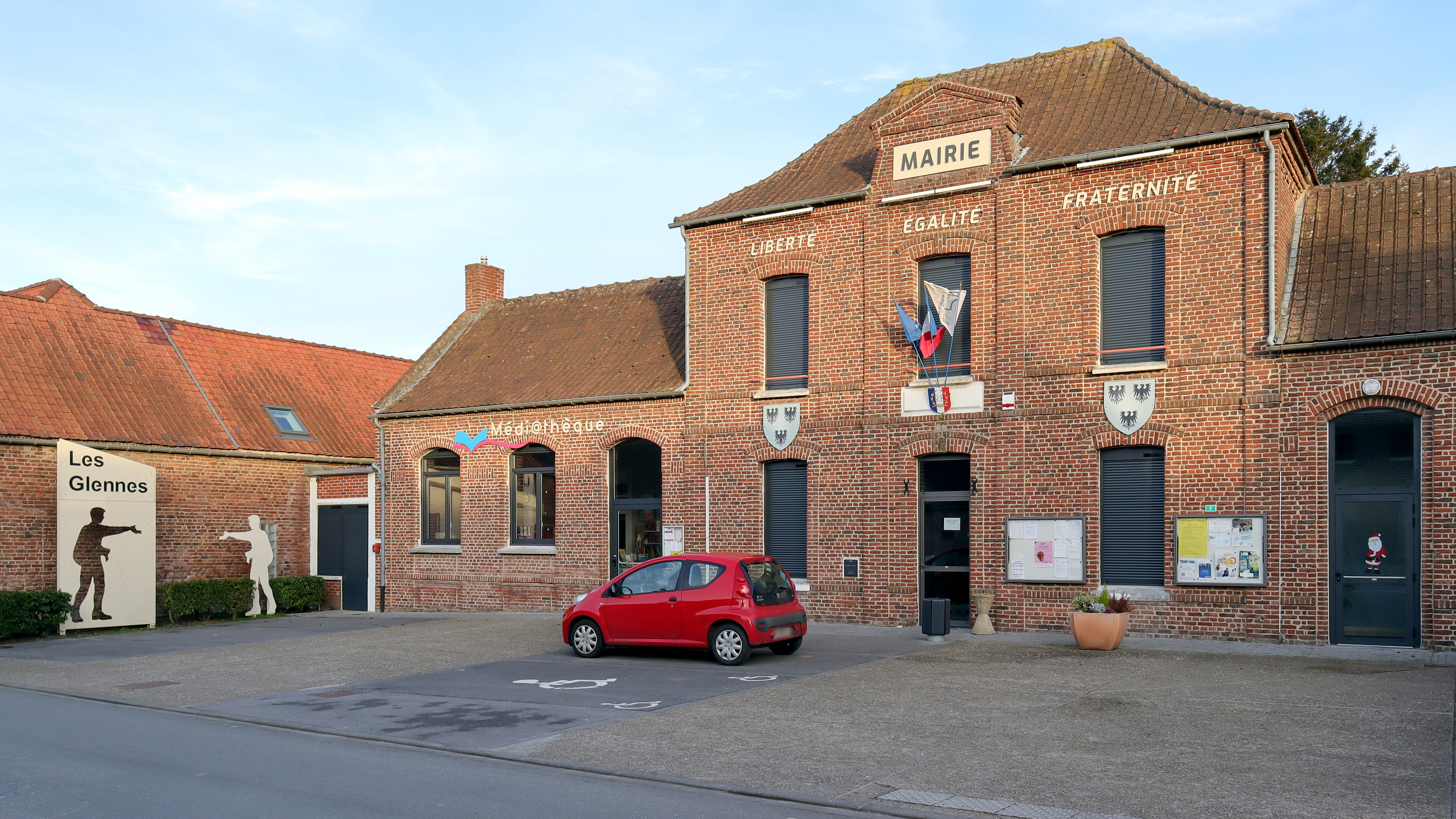
The town hall

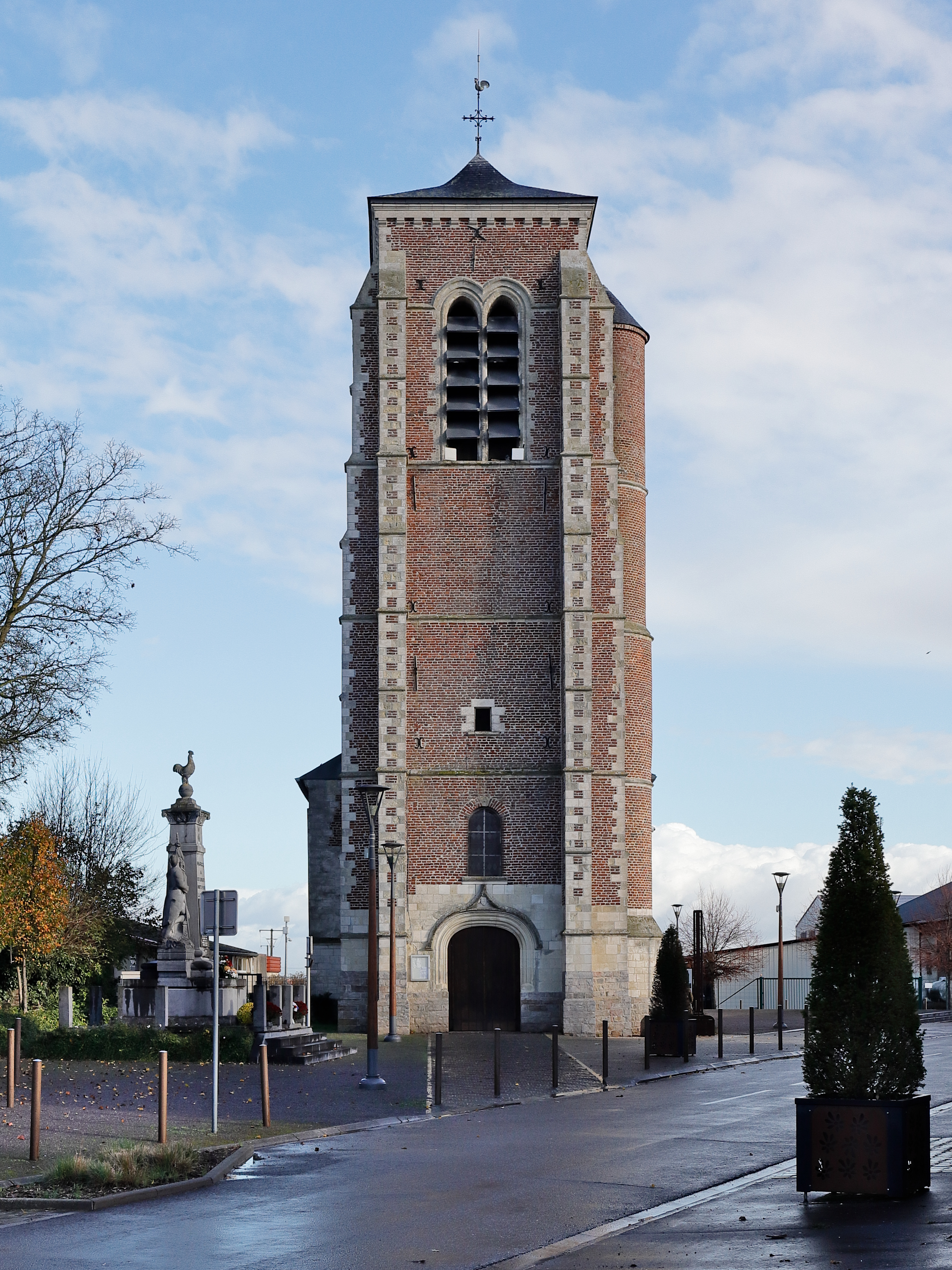
The church

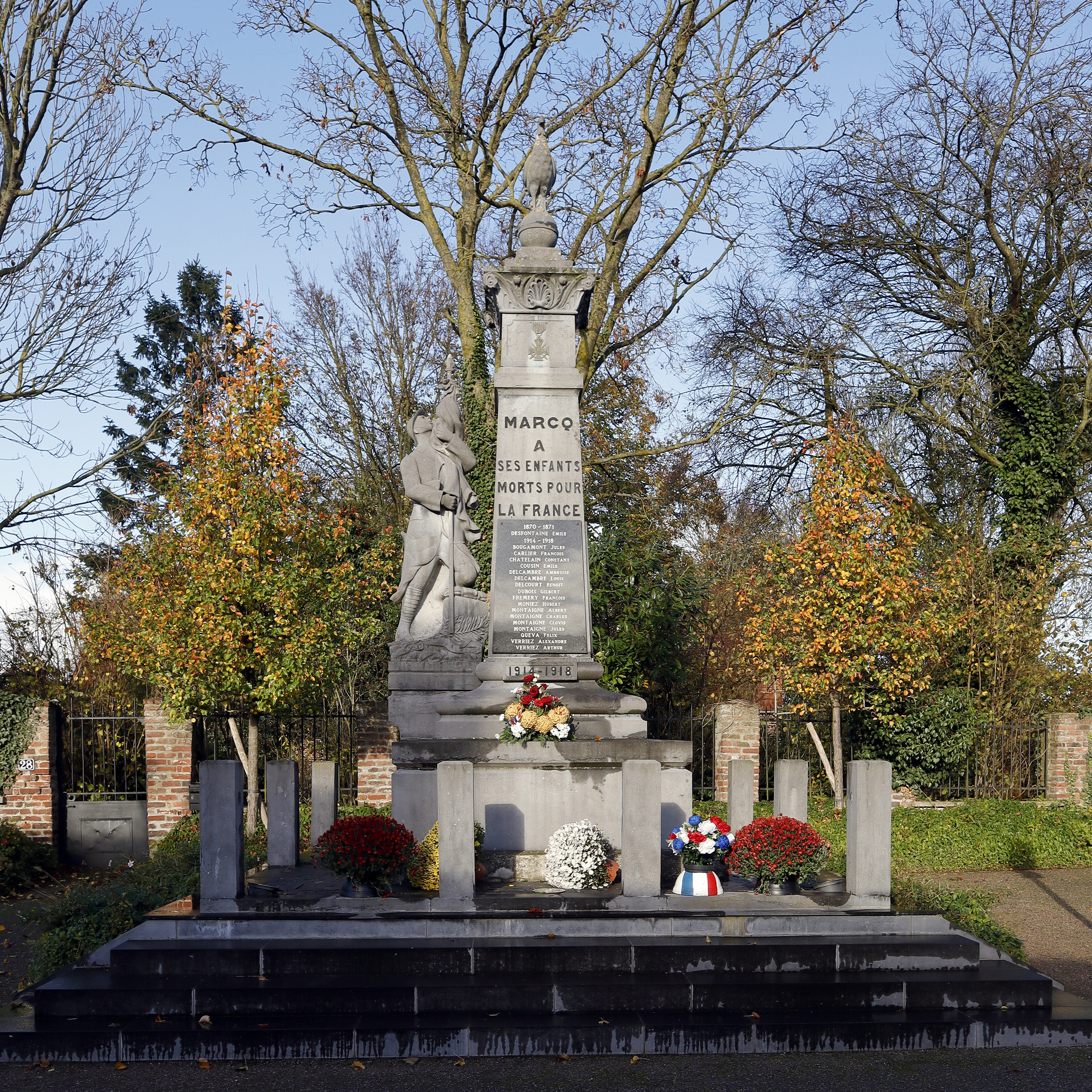
The war memorial

== Heraldry ==
Arms of Marcq-en-Ostrevent	The arms of Marcq-en-Ostrevent are blazoned : Argent, 3 eagles sable.

== See also ==
- Communes of the Nord department
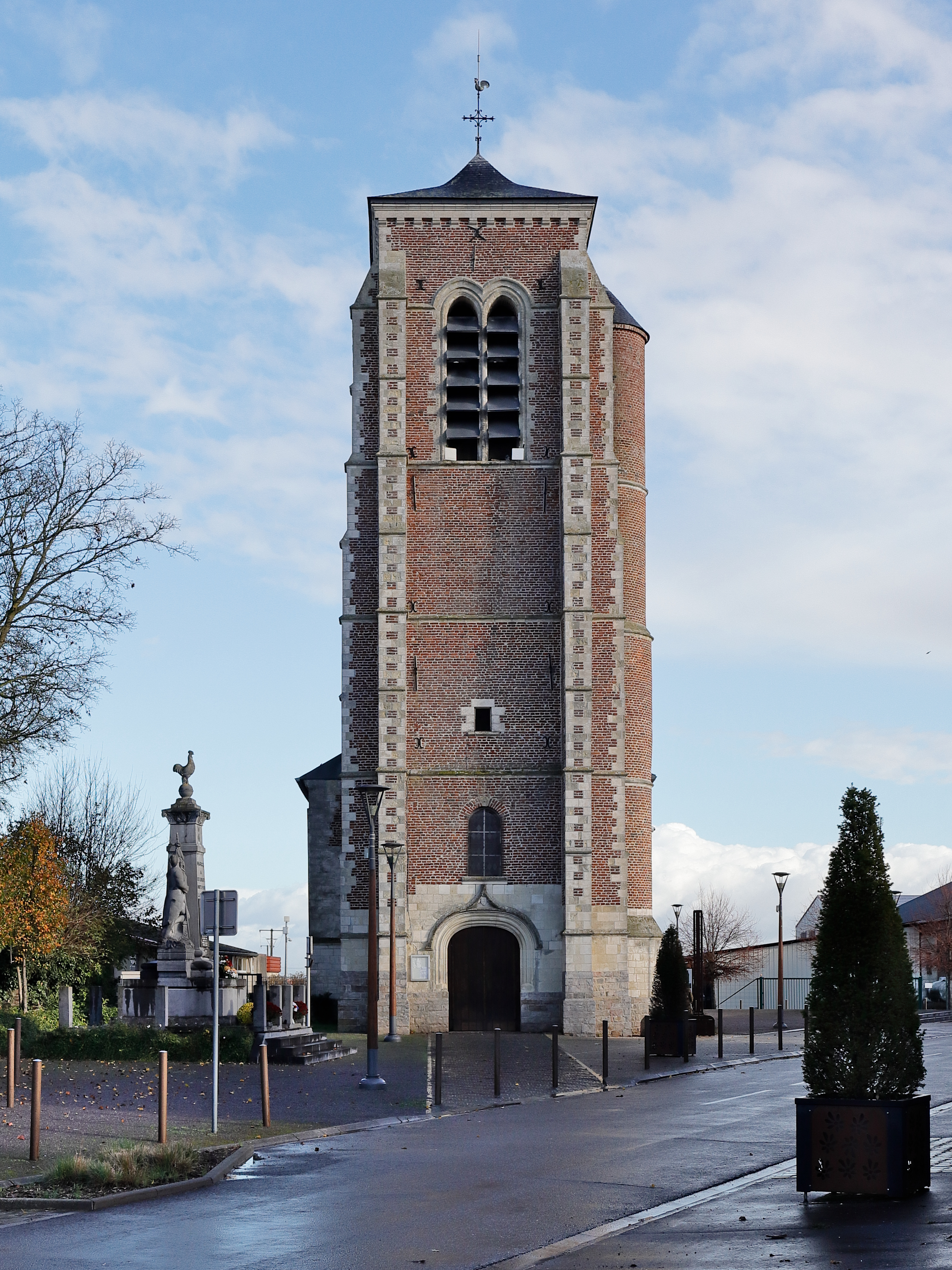
Saint-Sulpice Church

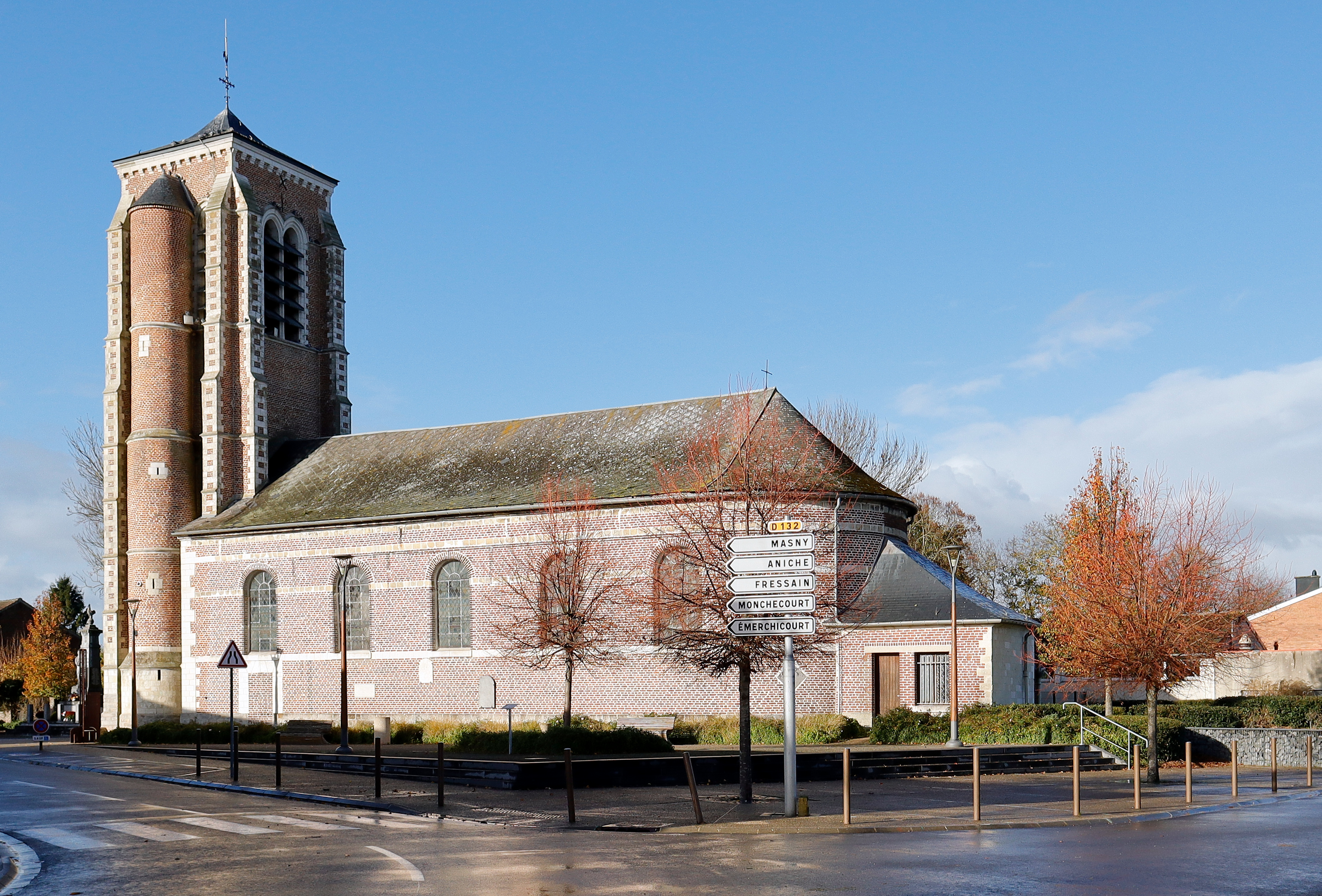
Saint-Sulpice Church

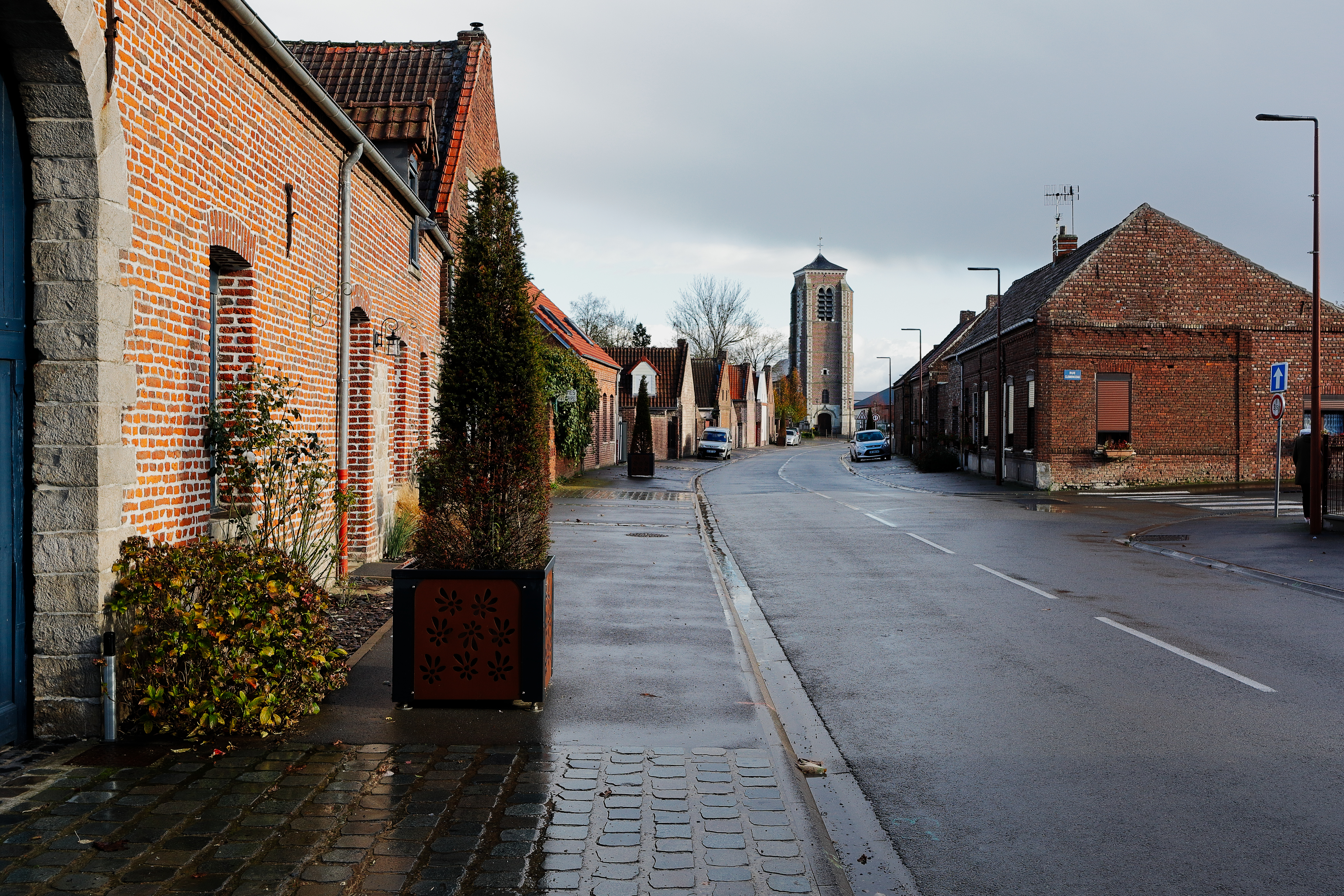
Rue du Maréchal Foch
