= Hamel, Nord =

Hamel
- Commune
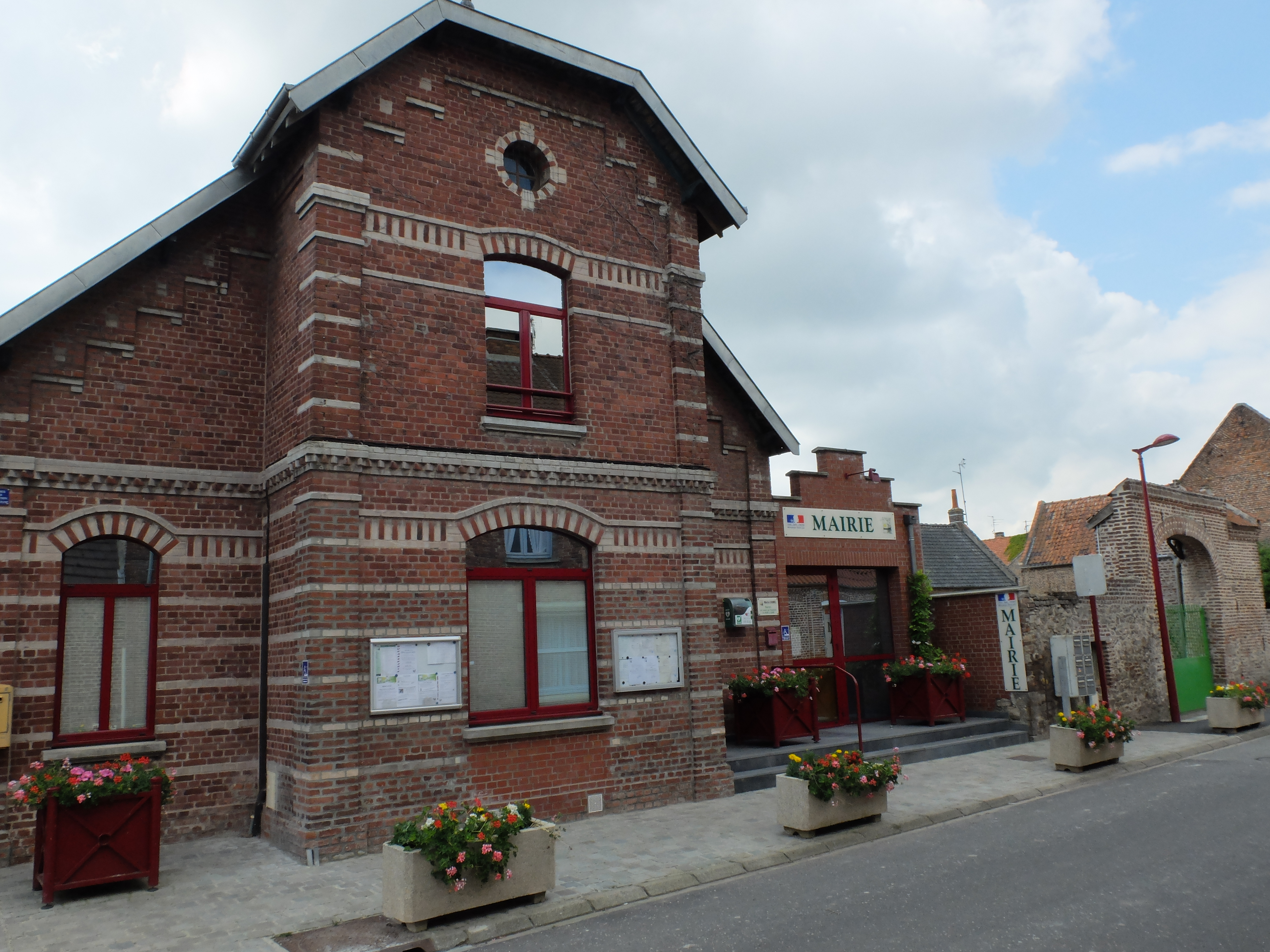
- The town hall in Hamel

- Coat of arms
- Location of Hamel
- Location within France Location within Hauts-de-France
- Coordinates: 50°16′51″N 3°04′29″E
- Country: France
- Region: Hauts-de-France
- Department: Nord
- Arrondissement: Douai
- Canton: Aniche
- Intercommunality: Douaisis Agglo

Government
  - Mayor (2020–2026): Jean-Luc Hallé
- Area^{1}: 3.59 km^{2} (1.39 sq mi)
- Highest elevation: 67 m (220 ft)
- Lowest elevation: 36 m (118 ft)
- Population (2023): 797
  - Density: 222/km^{2} (575/sq mi)
- Time zone: UTC+01:00 (CET)
  - Summer (DST): UTC+02:00 (CEST)
- INSEE/Postal code: 59280 /59151
- ^{1} French Land Register data, which excludes lakes, ponds, glaciers > 1 km^{2} (0.386 sq mi or 247 acres) and river estuaries.

Hamel (French pronunciation: [amɛl]) is a commune in the Nord department in northern France.

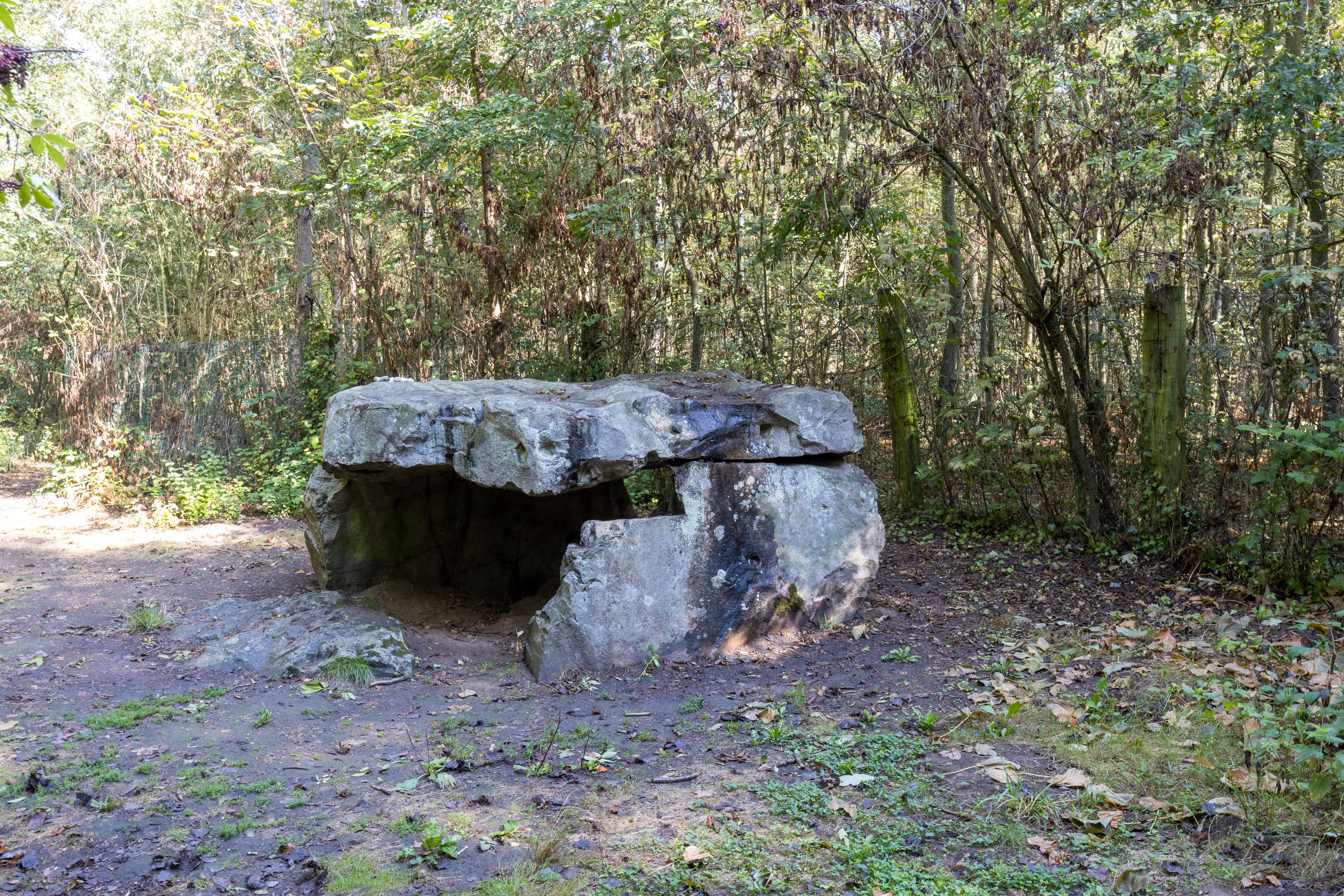
The Bois Dolmen

== Heraldry ==
Arms of Hamel	The arms of Hamel are blazoned : Vert, a chief ermine.

== See also ==
- Communes of the Nord department
