= Flers-en-Escrebieux =

- Commune
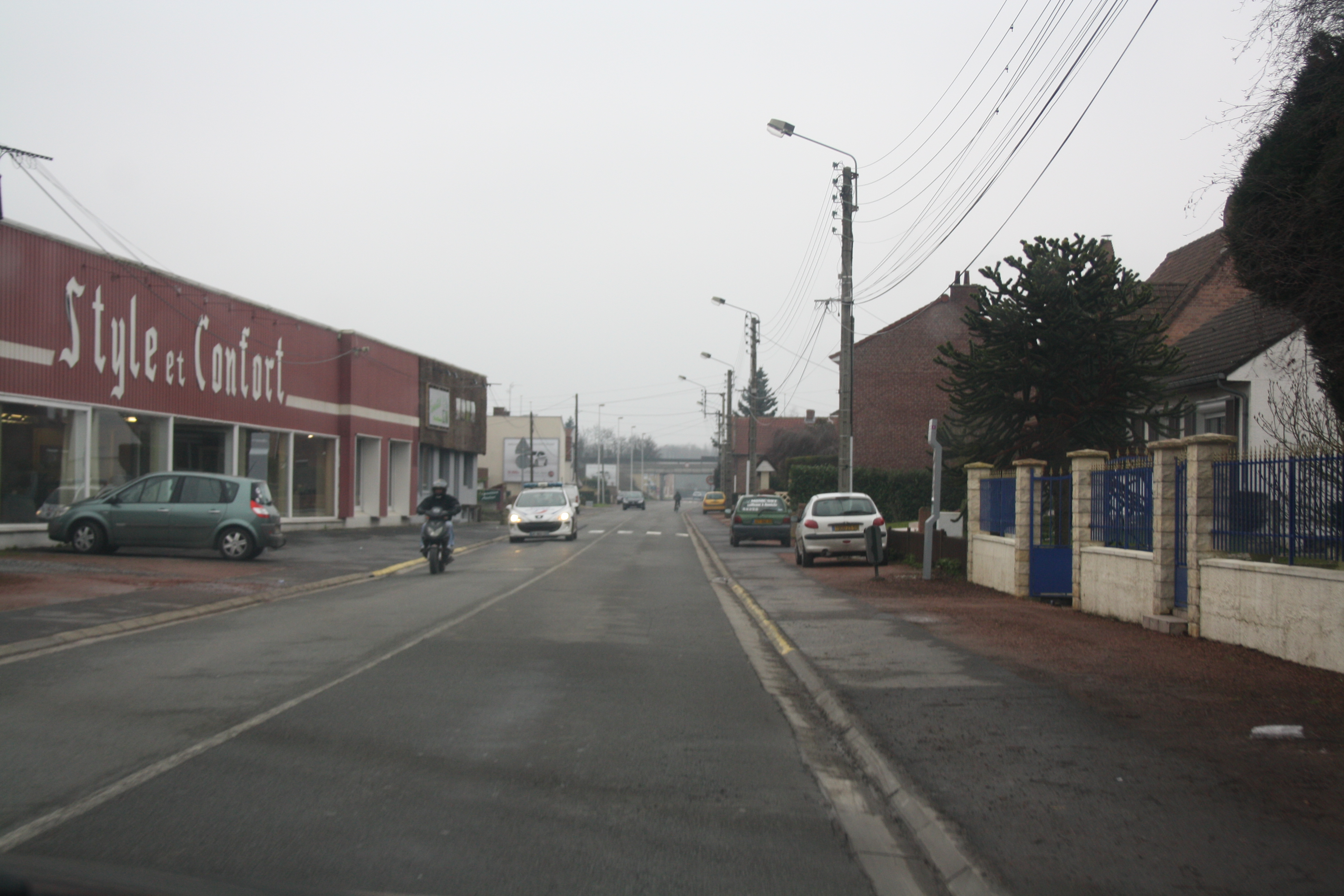
- A view within Flers-en-Escrebieux

- Coat of arms
- Location of Flers-en-Escrebieux
- Location within France Location within Hauts-de-France
- Coordinates: 50°23′53″N 3°03′47″E
- Country: France
- Region: Hauts-de-France
- Department: Nord
- Arrondissement: Douai
- Canton: Douai
- Intercommunality: Douaisis Agglo

Government
  - Mayor (2020–2026): Jean-Jacques Peyraud
- Area^{1}: 7.11 km^{2} (2.75 sq mi)
- Elevation: 23 m (75 ft)
- Highest elevation: 43 m (141 ft)
- Lowest elevation: 18 m (59 ft)
- Population (2023): 5,424
  - Density: 763/km^{2} (1,980/sq mi)
- Time zone: UTC+01:00 (CET)
  - Summer (DST): UTC+02:00 (CEST)
- INSEE/Postal code: 59234 /59128
- ^{1} French Land Register data, which excludes lakes, ponds, glaciers > 1 km^{2} (0.386 sq mi or 247 acres) and river estuaries.

Flers-en-Escrebieux (French pronunciation: [flɛʁs ɑ̃.n‿ɛskʁəbjø]) is a commune in the Nord department in northern France.

== Population ==
Historical population
Year	Pop.	±% p.a.
1968	6,675	—
1975	6,431	−0.53%
1982	5,491	−2.23%
1990	5,344	−0.34%
1999	5,540	+0.40%
2007	5,342	−0.45%
2012	5,769	+1.55%
2017	5,856	+0.30%
2023	5,424	−1.27%
Source: INSEE

== Heraldry ==
Arms of Flers-en-Escrebieux	The arms of Flers-en-Escrebieux are blazoned : Argent, a chevron, and in base an annulet gules.

== See also ==
- Communes of the Nord department
