= Erchin =

- Commune
- The grotto in Erchin

- Coat of arms
- Location of Erchin
- Location within France Location within Hauts-de-France
- Coordinates: 50°19′05″N 3°10′01″E
- Country: France
- Region: Hauts-de-France
- Department: Nord
- Arrondissement: Douai
- Canton: Aniche
- Intercommunality: Douaisis Agglo

Government
  - Mayor (2020–2026): Laurent Kumorek
- Area^{1}: 5.28 km^{2} (2.04 sq mi)
- Elevation: 41 m (135 ft)
- Highest elevation: 74 m (243 ft)
- Lowest elevation: 33 m (108 ft)
- Population (2023): 670
  - Density: 130/km^{2} (330/sq mi)
- Time zone: UTC+01:00 (CET)
  - Summer (DST): UTC+02:00 (CEST)
- INSEE/Postal code: 59199 /59169
- ^{1} French Land Register data, which excludes lakes, ponds, glaciers > 1 km^{2} (0.386 sq mi or 247 acres) and river estuaries.

Erchin (French pronunciation: [ɛʁʃɛ̃]) is a commune in the Nord department in northern France.

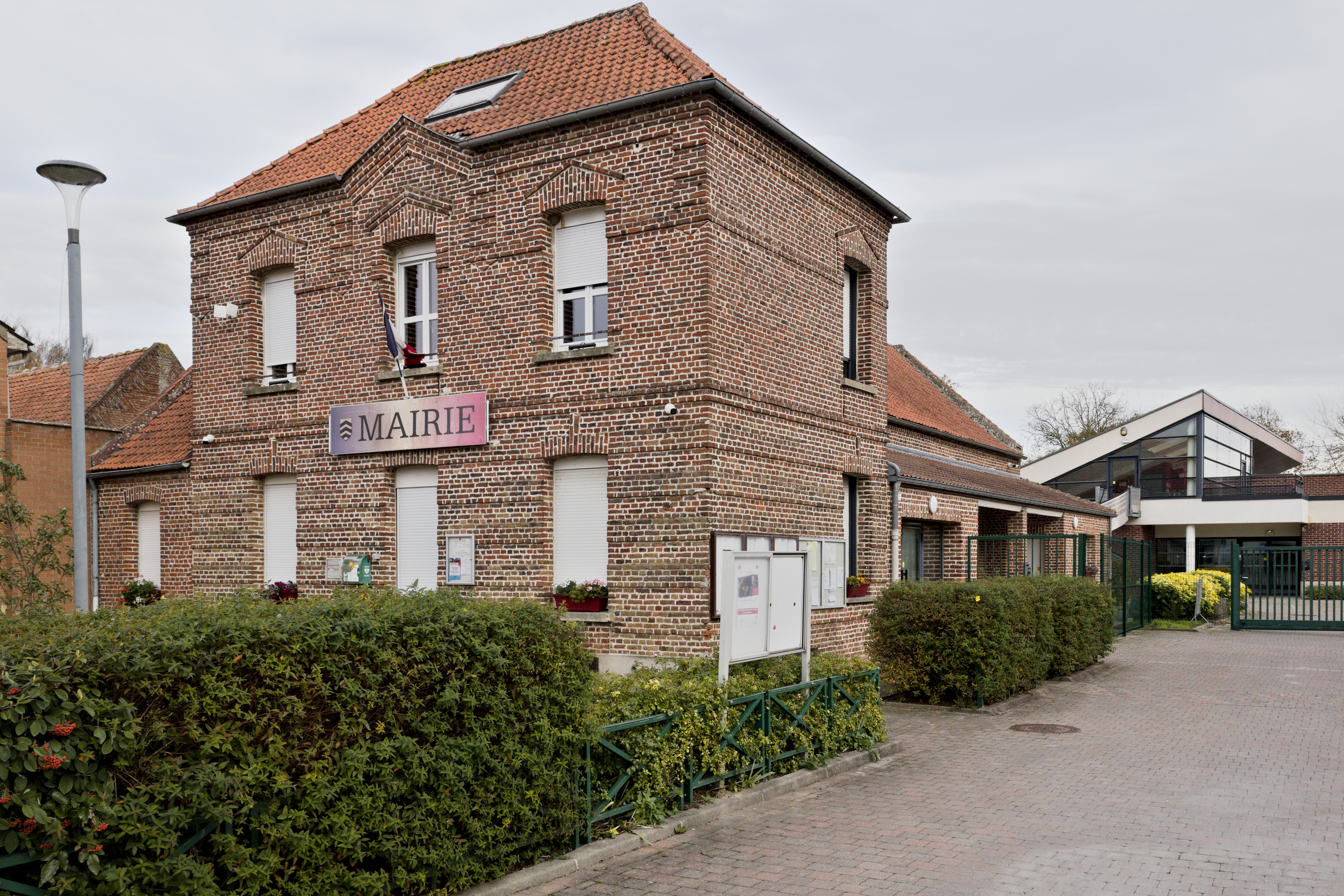
Town hall

== Heraldry ==
Arms of Erchin	The arms of Erchin are blazoned : Argent, 3 chevrons sable. (Erchin and Guesnain use the same arms.)

== See also ==
- Communes of the Nord department
