= Somain =

Somain may refer to:

- Somain, Nord, a commune in France

== See also ==
- Soman, a nerve agent
- Somain-Péruwelz Railway
- Somain-Halluin Railway
- Soman (disambiguation)
