= Soman (disambiguation) =

Soman is a chemical weapon.

Soman may also refer to:

- Soman, Iran, a village
- Soman (band)

== People ==
- Bhaskar Sadashiv Soman (1913–1995), Indian naval officer
- Chitra Soman (born 1983), Indian athlete
- K. A. Soman (born 1953), artist from Kerala, India
- Milind Soman, Indian model
- M. G. Soman (1941–1997), Indian actor who appeared in Malayalam films
- Patricia Soman (born 1981), Côte d'Ivoire long jumper
- Vazhoor Soman (1952–2025), Indian politician
- Soman Chainani, Indian-American filmmaker and writer

== See also ==
- Suman (disambiguation)
- Somain (disambiguation)
