= Hervé Théry =

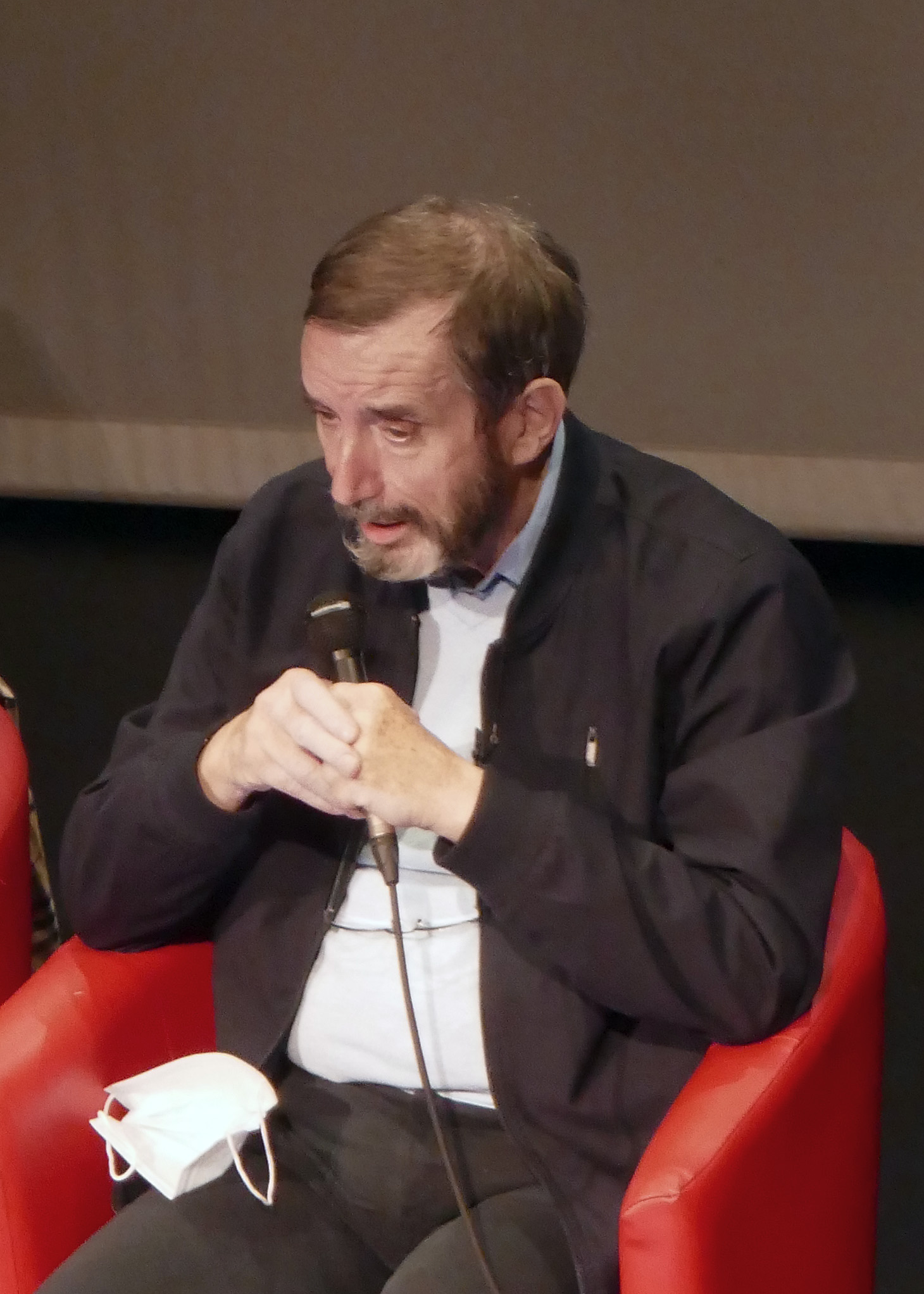
- Hervé Théry at the International Geography Festival in 2020
- Born: 1951 (age 74–75); Somain, France
- Citizenship: (France) French, (Brazil) Brazilian
- Education: École normale supérieure (1973–1979), University of Paris 1 Panthéon-Sorbonne (PhD, 1976)
- Known for: Research on Brazilian territorial dynamics, pioneer fronts, and thematic cartography
- Scientific career
- Fields: Geography
- Workplaces: University of São Paulo, CNRS, University of Paris-Nanterre, University Sorbonne Nouvelle
- Doctoral advisor: Michel Rochefort

Hervé Théry (born 1951 in Somain, France) is a French and Brazilian internationally renowned geographer. A specialist in Brazilian territorial dynamics, his research focuses on topics such as pioneer agricultural fronts (e.g., soybean in Mato Grosso, sugarcane in São Paulo), ecological tensions, and thematic cartography.

He is currently an emeritus research director at CREDAL-CNRS and a professor at the University of São Paulo (USP). In 2007, he co-founded the Franco-Brazilian geography journal Confins with Neli Aparecida de Mello.

== Biography ==
Théry graduated from the École normale supérieure (1973–1979), obtained his agrégation in geography in 1976, and completed his PhD in geography the same year at University of Paris 1 Panthéon-Sorbonne. In 1994, he earned his habilitation to direct research (HDR) at University of Paris X.

He has worked at prestigious institutions including CNRS, University of Paris-Nanterre, and the University Sorbonne Nouvelle

From 1991 to 1994, he directed the GIP RECLUS program, which advanced thematic cartography in France. As a scientific advisor to the company Articque, he contributed to the development of the software Cartes & Données.

== Research ==
Théry's research centers on the geographic and socio-economic dynamics of Brazil. His studies on pioneer agricultural fronts in the Amazon rainforest and São Paulo state address significant ecological and social tensions caused by the expansion of soybean cultivation and sugarcane farming.

== Selected Publications ==
=== Books ===
- Amazone: Un monde en partage, CNRS Éditions, 2024.
- Le Brésil, Paris: Armand Colin, 6th ed., 2012.
- L’Amérique Latine (co-edited with Marie-Françoise Fleury), Atlande, 2021, ISBN 978-2-35030-736-7.
- Atlas do Brasil: Disparidades e dinâmicas do território (with Neli Aparecida de Mello), São Paulo: EDUSP, 3rd ed., 2018.
- Environnement et développement en Amazonie brésilienne, Paris: Belin, 1997.
- Pouvoir et territoire au Brésil: de l'archipel au continent, Paris: Éditions de la MSH, 1996.

=== Articles ===
- “Géopolitiques du dérèglement climatique au Brésil,” Hérodote, no. 195, 2024, pp. 145–159.
- “Puissance et diversité de l’agriculture brésilienne,” (with Marie-Françoise Fleury), Géoconfluences, December 2024.
- “Geografias do Turismo no Brasil: uma perspectiva socioterritorial” (with Rita de Cássia Ariza da Cruz and Angela Teberga de Paula), Revista Territorial, vol. 13, no. 2, 2024.
