= Jean-Jacques Desandrouin =

Belgian viscount and businessman

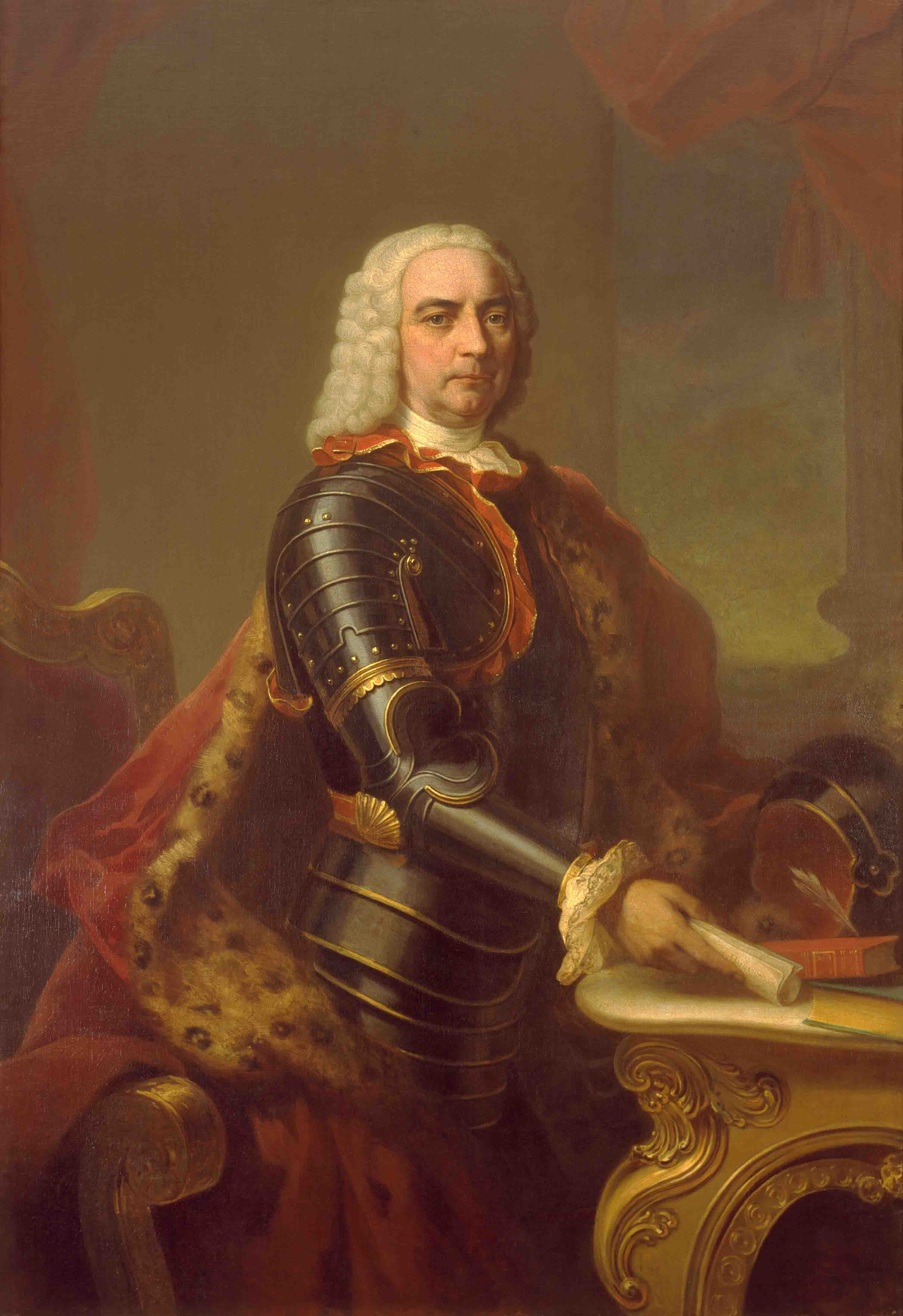
- Viscount
- Born: 25 May 1681; Charleroi, Holy Roman Empire
- Died: 16 November 1761 (aged 80); Charleroi, Holy Roman Empire
- Occupation(s): Business, Glass, Steel & Coal Industry
- Spouses: Marie-Charlotte de Houelle de Pommeray; Jourdaine Madeleine Julie le Tirant de Villers
- Children: Pierre Jacques Gédéon (de Marie-Charlotte); Marie Madeleine Sophie; Jean-Marie Stanislas; François Joseph Théodore Désandrouin; Pierre Alexandre
- Parent(s): Viscount Gédéon Desandrouin and Marie de Condé

The Viscount Jean-Jacques Desandrouin (25 May 1681 – 16 November 1761) came from the district of Lodelinsart belonging to the Holy Roman Empire city of Charleroi. His name is connected to the beginnings of the industrial revolution in the Goly Roman Empire and the massive expansion of coal mining in the area of Anzin in northern France. For the spelling of his name, there are variants 'Désandrouin or 'Desandrouins or sometimes De Sandrouin and Androuins.

His activities changed the face of this region. His economic success was based on his involvement in the manufacture of glass, in metal production, in forging and in promotion and transport of coal. He co-founded and owned the most important mining company in his time the Compagnie des mines d'Anzin, which was founded on 19 November 1757.
