= Suman =

Suman may refer to:

== Given name ==
- Suman (actor), Indian actor
- Suman Bala (field hockey) (born 1981), Indian field hockey player
- Suman Chakraborty, Indian engineer
- Suman Deodhar (born 1930), Indian badminton player
- Suman Ghosh (born 1967), Indian classical vocalist
- Suman Ghosh (director), Indian director of Bengali films
- Suman Kalyanpur (born 1937), Indian singer
- Suman Kundu, Indian wrestler
- Suman Mahato (born 1964), Indian politician
- Suman Mukhopadhyay (born 1966), Indian filmmaker
- Suman Nagarkar, Indian actress in Kannada films
- Suman Pokhrel (born 1967), Nepali poet, lyricist, translator, and artist
- Suman Ranganathan (born 1974), Indian model and actress
- Suman Rawat, Indian athlete
- Suman Sahai, Indian activist
- Suman Setty (born 1981), Indian actor in Tamil and Telugu films
- Suman Shashi Kant, Indian actress
- Suman Sridhar (born 1983), Indian singer-songwriter
- Surendra Jha 'Suman' (1910–2002), Indian writer and politician

== Surname ==
- Adhyayan Suman (born 1988), Indian actor in Hindi films
- Amita Suman (born 1997), British-Nepalese actress
- Balka Suman, Indian politician
- Don Suman, American college basketball coach
- John Robert Suman (1890–1972), American petroleum engineer and business executive
- Kabir Suman (born 1949), Bengali musician and poet
- Nusret Suman (1905–1978), Turkish sculptor
- Ram Ji Lal Suman (born 1950), Indian politician
- Shekhar Suman (born 1960), Indian actor
- Shivmangal Singh Suman (1915–2002), Hindi writer and poet
- Shri Dev Suman (1916–1944), Indian independence activist
- Tirumalasetti Suman (born 1983), Indian cricketer

== Other uses ==
- Suman (food), a Philippine rice cake
- Suman, Indiana, an unincorporated community
- Suman River in Arkhangai, Mongolia

== See also ==
- Soman (disambiguation)
