= Somain-Péruwelz Railway =

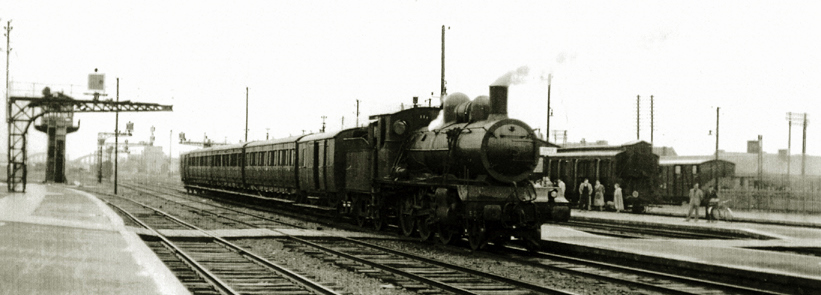

Overview
- Status: Defunct
- Owner: Compagnie des mines d'Anzin (until 1946); Charbonnages de France thereafter
- Locale: France (Hauts-de-France)
- Termini: Somain; Péruwelz

History
- Opened: 1838
- Closed: 1983

Technical
- Line length: 40 km (25 mi)
- Number of tracks: Single track
- Track gauge: 1,435 mm (4 ft 8 1/2 in) standard gauge

The Somain to Péruwelz railway was one of the first railways in France. It opened in October 1838, linking Abscon in the department du Nord with Saint Waast-la-Haut. It was gradually extended, and by 1874 it linked Somain in France with Péruwelz in Belgium. At its peak, the line had a length of 25 miles (40 km).

== History ==
The line was opened in sections:

- 21 October 1838: Abscon - Saint-Waast-la-Haut
- January 1842: Saint-Waast - Anzin Mines
- 20 June 1848: Somain - Abscon
- 23 May 1873: Vieux-Condé - Péruwelz
- 1 June 1874: Anzin - Vieux-Condé

The line was closed to passengers in 1963. The section between Péruwelz and Vieux Condé was dismantled in 1975, and freight traffic ended on the remainder of the line on 17 November 1986. Part of the former route of the railway is now being used for the Valenciennes Tramway.

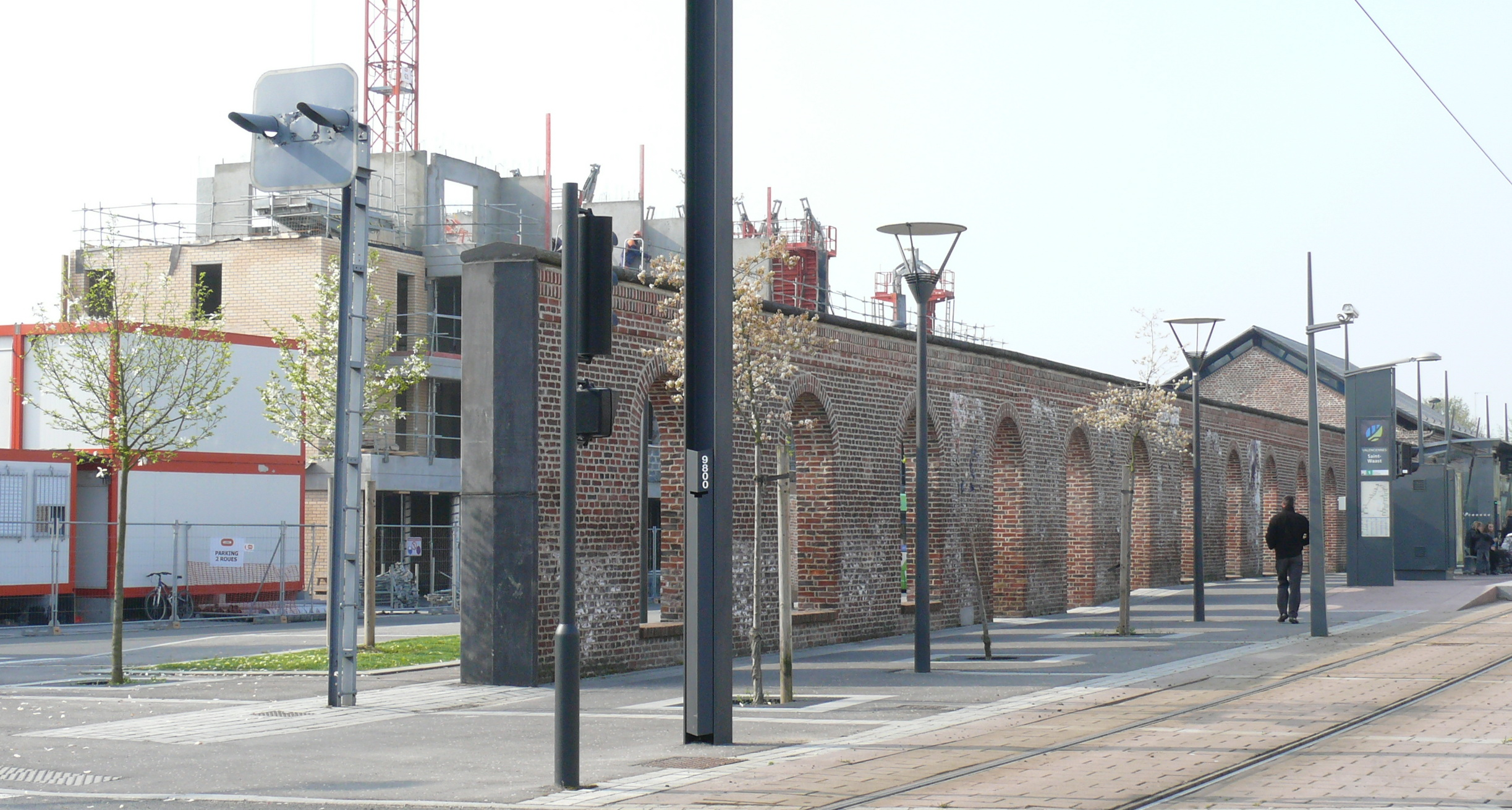
Saint Waast station on the Valenciennes tramway.

== Route ==
The line served the following stations: Gare de Somain; Abscon, km 4; Escaudain, km 7; Denain, km 10; Hérin, km 15; Saint-Waast (Valenciennes), km 18; Anzin, km 19; Le Moulin, km 21; Bruay, km 23; Thiers la Grange, km 25; Escautpont-Mines, km 27; Fresnes, km 28; Condé, km 30; Vieux-Condé, km 32; Frontière passage, km 37; Péruwelz, km 40.

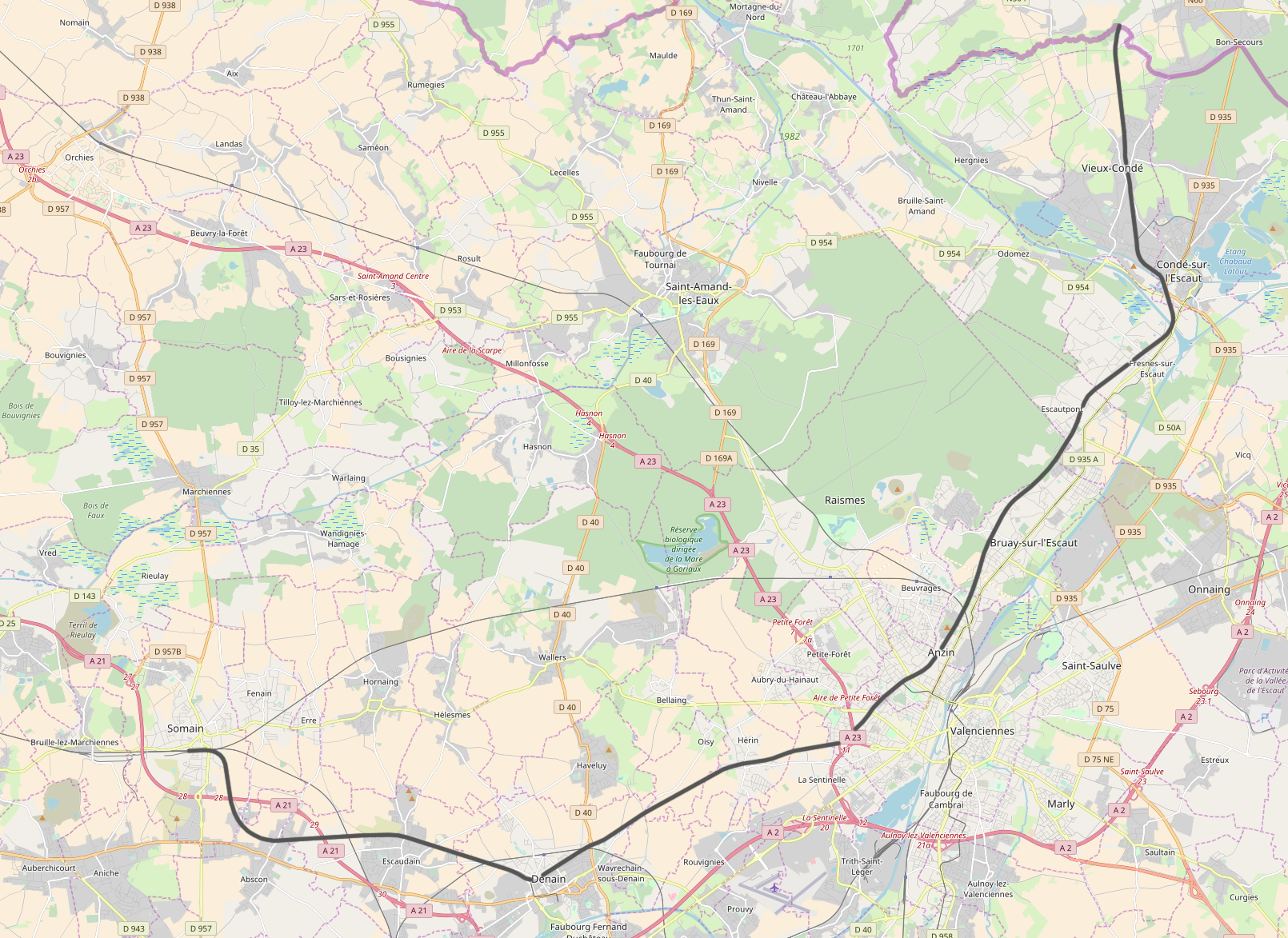
Map of the route

== Gallery ==
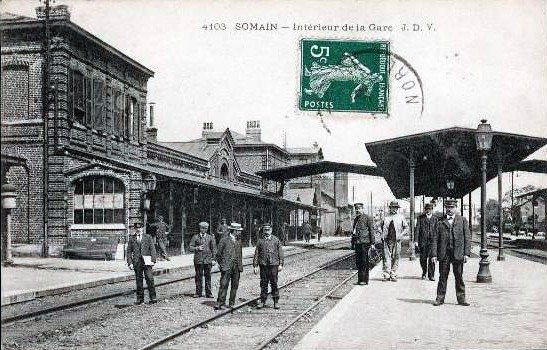
Gare de Somain circa 1900

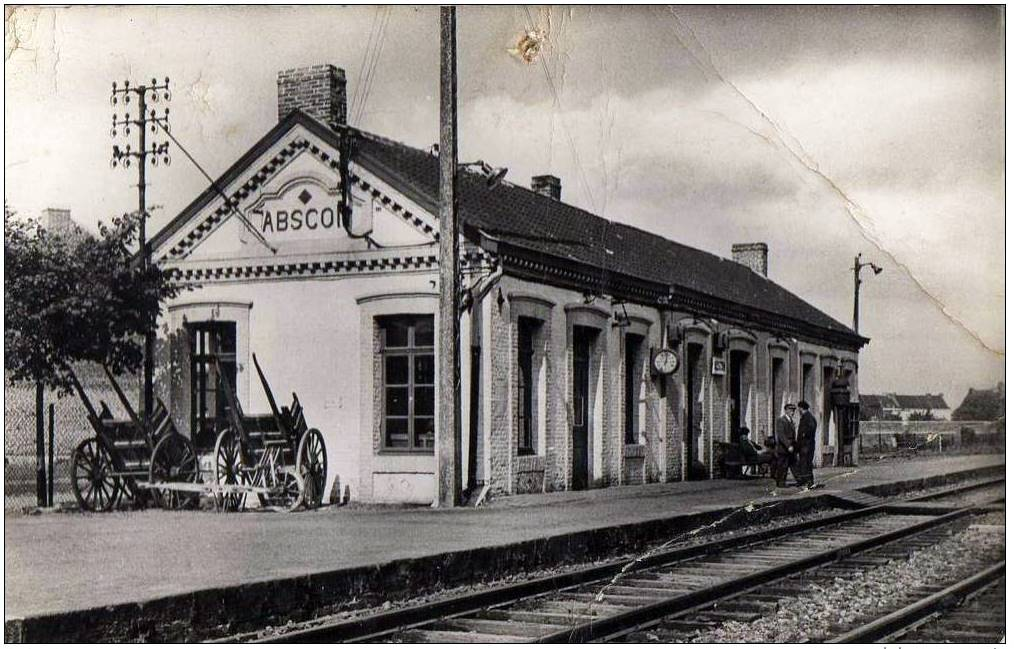
Gare d'Abscon

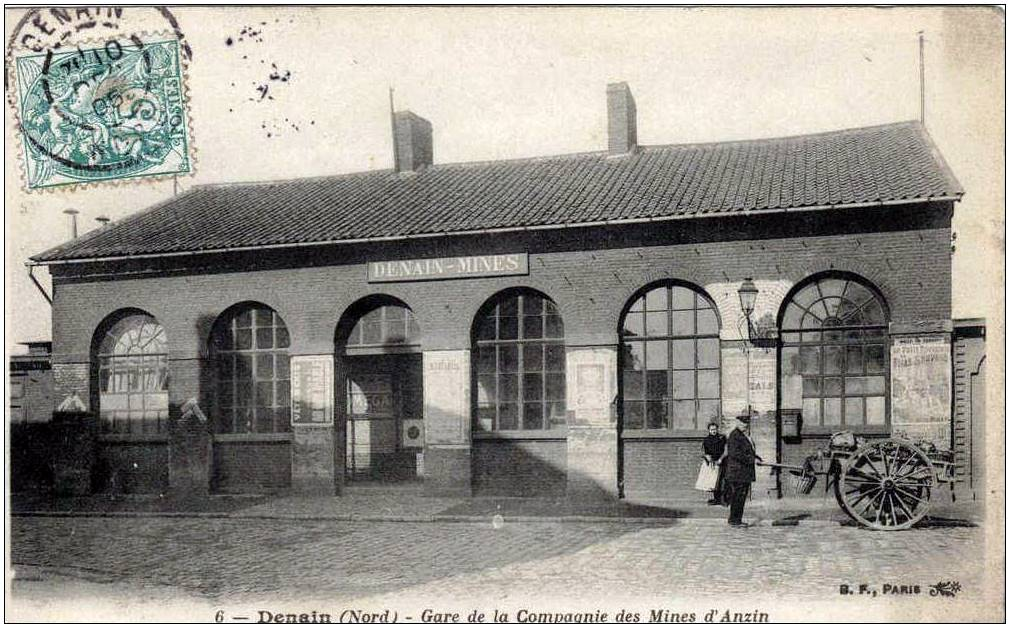
Gare de Denain-mines circa 1905

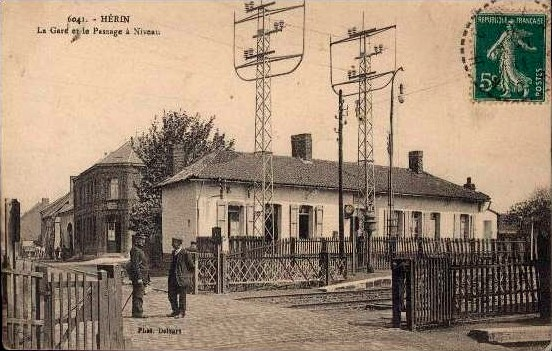
Gare d'Hérin circa 1900

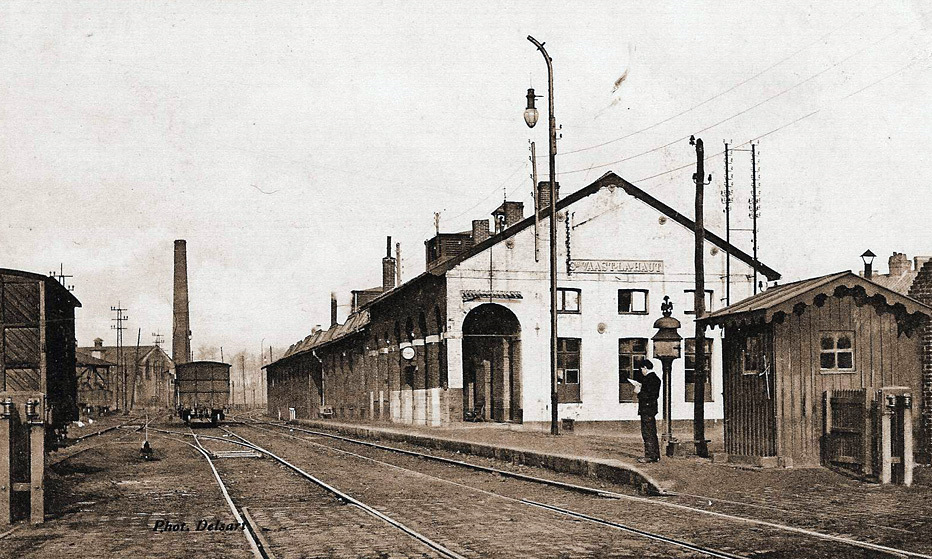
Gare de Saint-Waast circa 1950

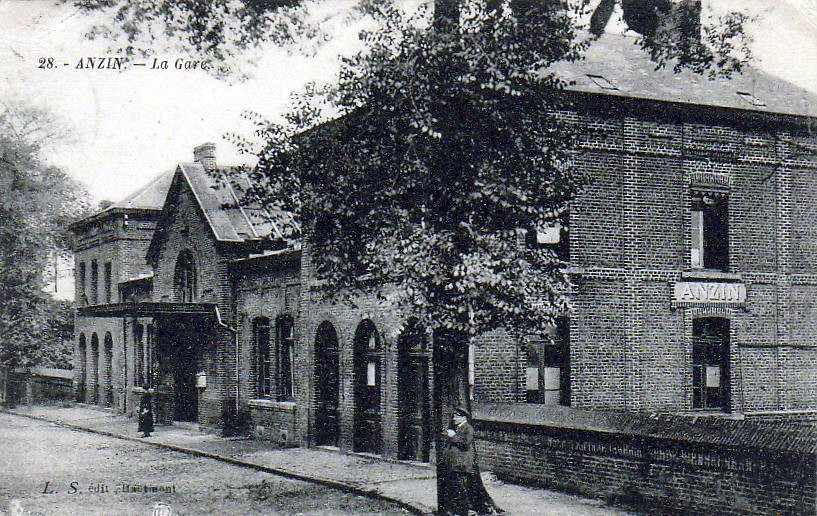
Gare d'Anzin circa 1900

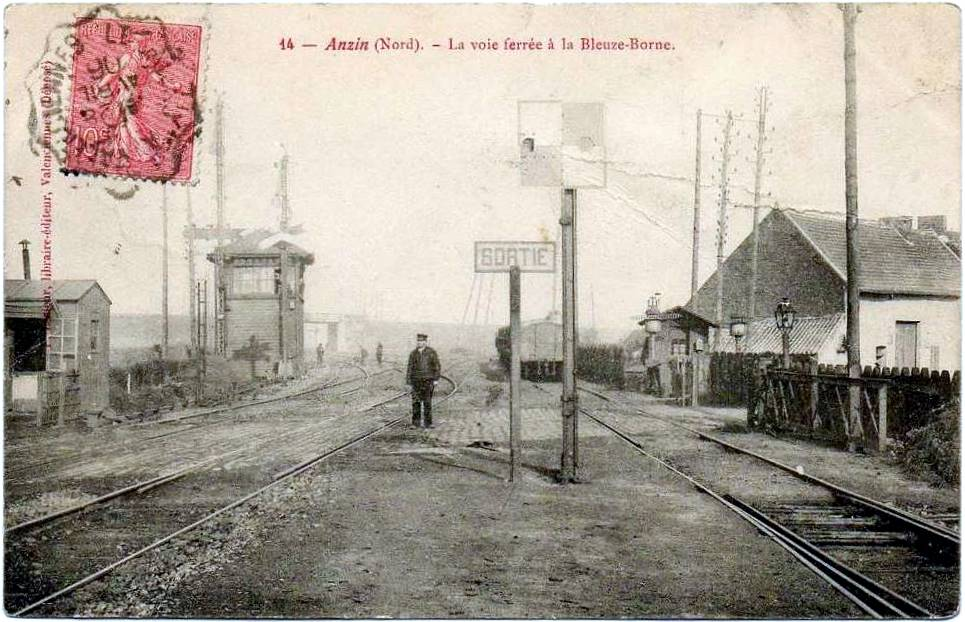
Halte de la Bleuse Borne (Le Moulin)

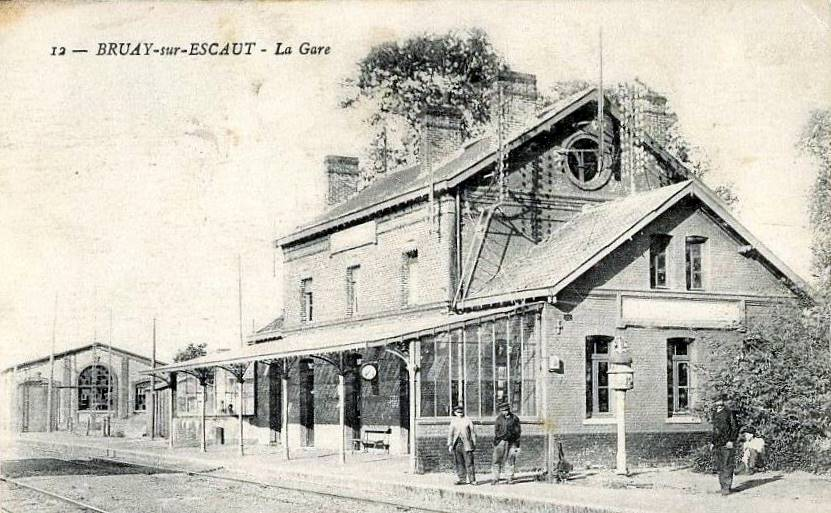
Gare de Bruay in 1938

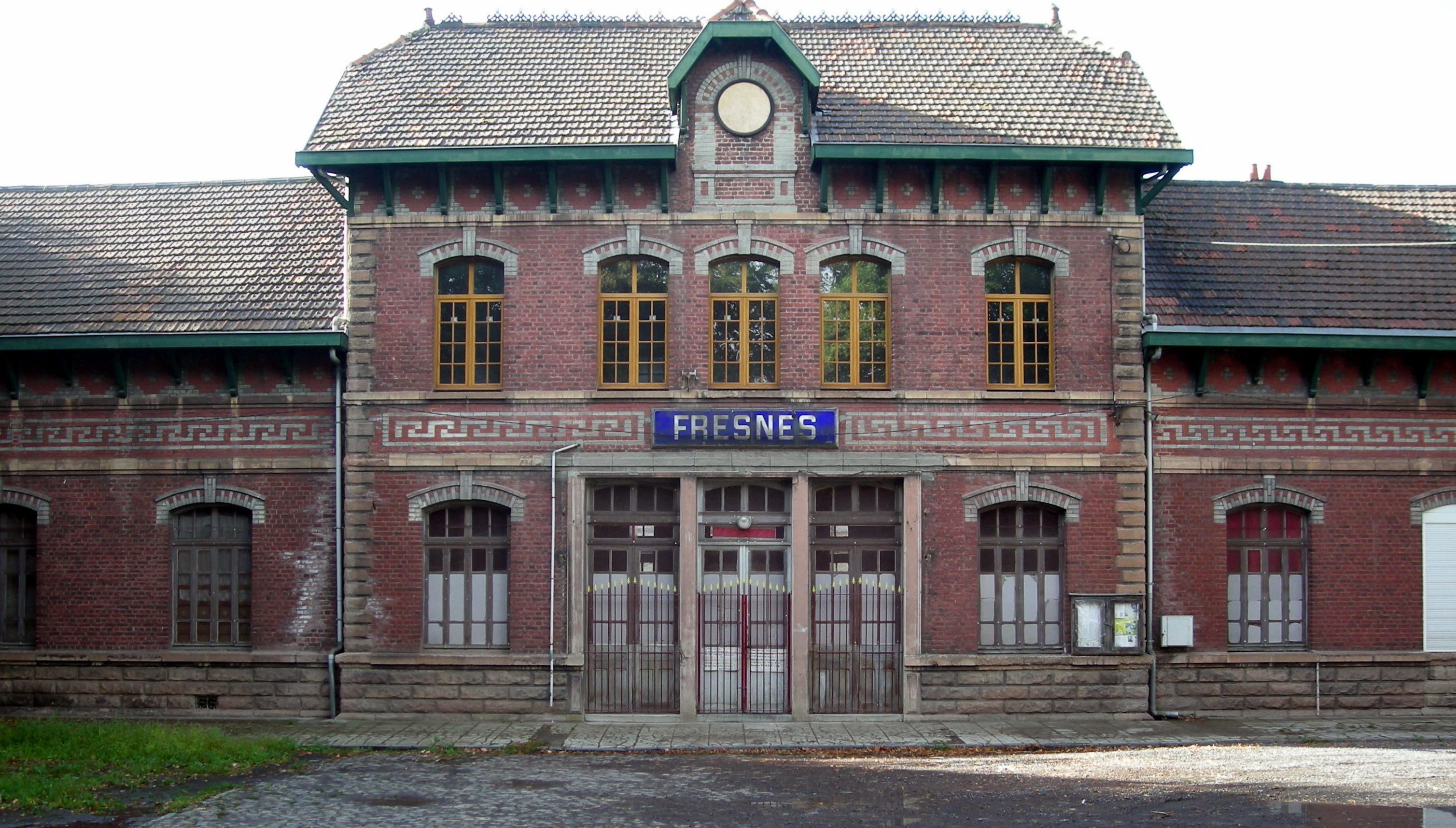
Gare de Fresnes in 2009

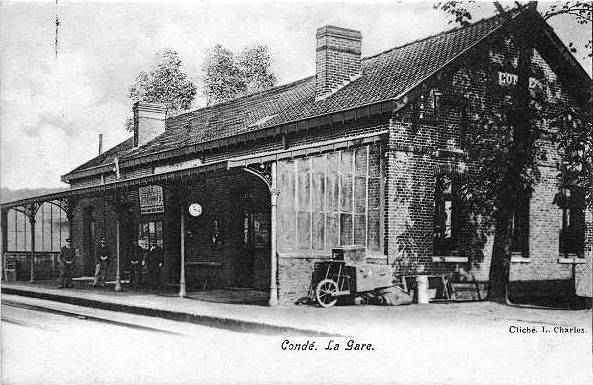
Gare de Condé/Escaut circa 1950

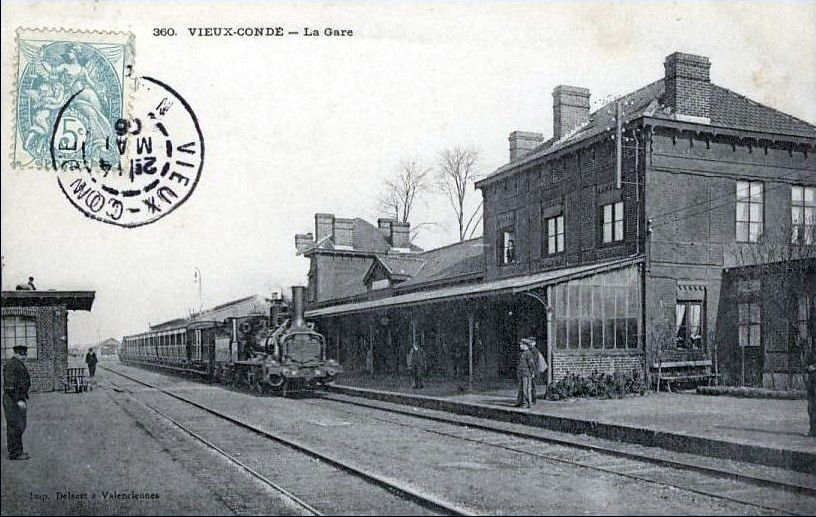
Gare de Vieux-Condé circa 1906

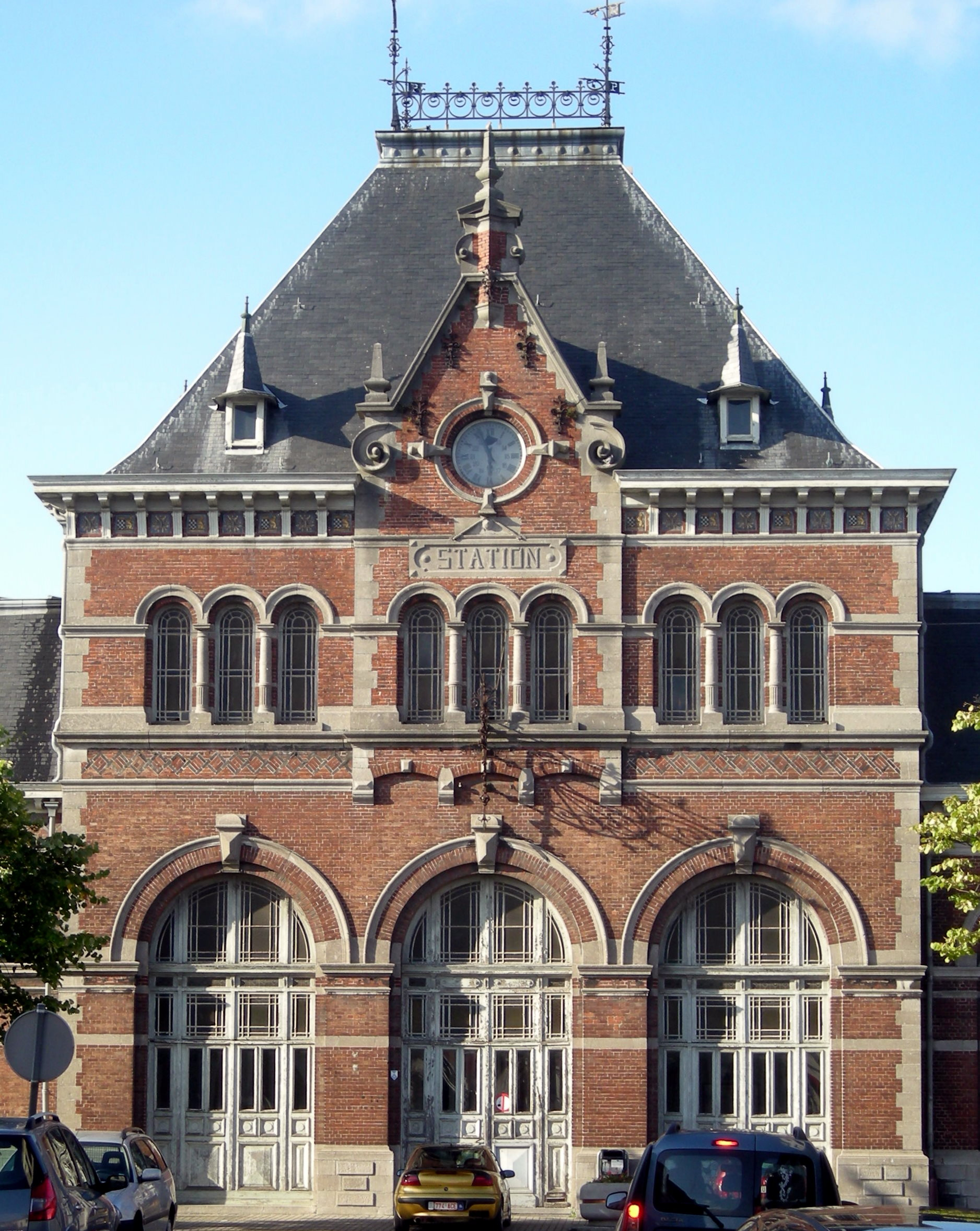
Gare de Péruwelz in 2009
