= Somain–Halluin railway =

Railway line in France

Somain-Halluin Railway

Overview
- Status: Partially defunct
- Owner: Compagnie des Chemins de fer du Nord Est (1869–1888); Compangie des Chemins de fer du Nord (1888–1938); SNCF (1938–1997); Réseau Ferré de France (1997–present)
- Locale: France (Nord-Pas-de-Calais)
- Termini: Somain; Halluin

History
- Opened: 1874–1878
- Closed: 1975–2015

Technical
- Line length: 57 km (35 mi)
- Number of tracks: Single track
- Track gauge: 1,435 mm (4 ft 8 1/2 in) standard gauge

The Somain-Halluin railway was a French standard gauge railway in the Nord-Pas-de-Calais. It was 35 miles long and it linked the town of Somain in the département du Nord with Halluin near the Belgian border, via Orchies and Tourcoing. Today, the line is closed to passengers. The section between Orchies and Ascq was used by local passenger trains until 2015. It was decided in 2020 not to renovate and re-open the line. Instead, the current TER Hauts-de-France bus service is planned to be upgraded by 2026.

== History ==
On 15 September 1871, the French North Eastern railway was awarded a concession to construct the Somain to Roubaix & Tourcoing railway. The line aimed to transport coal to support textile industries in the area. Local municipalities had been consulted in June 1871, and a definitive route was published just over three years later on 12 January 1875.

In 1876, the French Northern Railway acquired various railway lines in the area, including the short part of the Somain-Halluin Railway which was then open (10 miles between Somain and Orchies). In 1879, the line reached Tourcoing.

The first section of the line to lose passenger trains was the stretch between Somain and Orchies, where services were withdrawn on 15 May 1939. The section between Ascq and Tourcoing followed six weeks later.

Passenger services were maintained until December 1971 between Toircoing and Halluin.

=== Closure ===
After passenger services were withdrawn, freight services continued to use the line. However, the line was eventually shut down in stages:

- Halluin to Belgian border: 24 February 1975
- Wandignies-Hamage to Orchies and Lannoy to Roubaix-Wattrelos: 22 February 1991
- Orchies-Ascq: 28 June 2015
