= Anzin =

- Commune
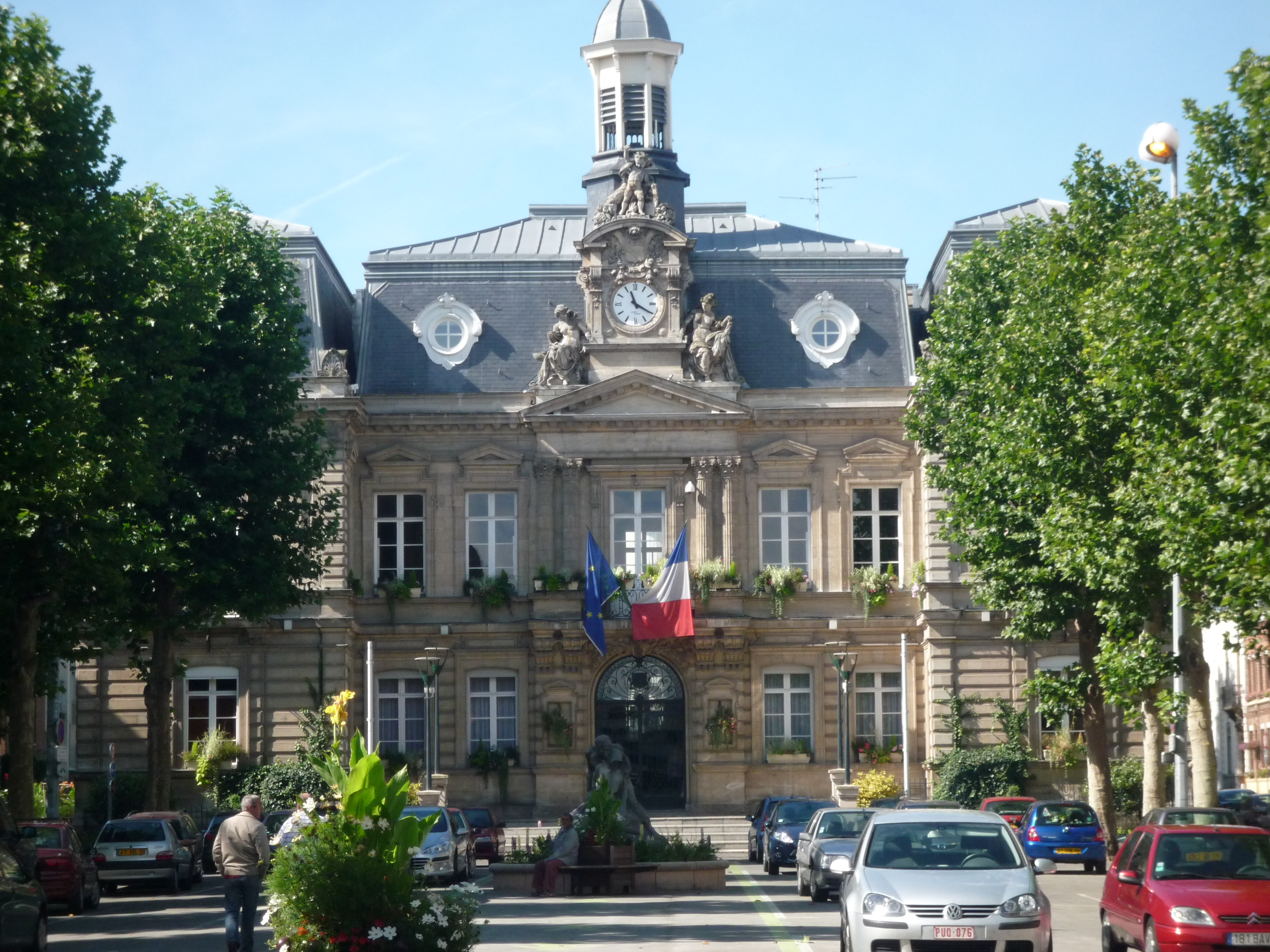
- Town hall

- Coat of arms
- Location of Anzin
- Location within France Location within Hauts-de-France
- Coordinates: 50°22′20″N 3°30′18″E
- Country: France
- Region: Hauts-de-France
- Department: Nord
- Arrondissement: Valenciennes
- Canton: Anzin
- Intercommunality: CA Valenciennes Métropole

Government
  - Mayor (2020–2026): Pierre-Michel Bernard
- Area^{1}: 3.64 km^{2} (1.41 sq mi)
- Elevation: 15 m (49 ft)
- Highest elevation: 95 m (312 ft)
- Lowest elevation: 18 m (59 ft)
- Population (2023): 13,183
  - Density: 3,620/km^{2} (9,380/sq mi)
- Demonym(s): Anzinois, Anzinoise
- Time zone: UTC+01:00 (CET)
  - Summer (DST): UTC+02:00 (CEST)
- INSEE/Postal code: 59014 /59410
- ^{1} French Land Register data, which excludes lakes, ponds, glaciers > 1 km^{2} (0.386 sq mi or 247 acres) and river estuaries.

Anzin (French pronunciation: [ɑ̃zɛ̃]; older Dutch: Ansingen; West Flemish: Ansingn) is a commune in the Nord department, Hauts-de-France, France. It lies on the Scheldt, 2.4 kilometres (1 1/2 mi) northwest of Valenciennes, of which it is a suburb.

== History ==
Anzin was once the centre of important coal mines of the Valenciennes basin belonging to the Anzin Company, the formation of which dates to 1717. The commune's first coal layer of the area in 1734. The company of the mines of Anzin (Compagnie des mines d'Anzin) was created in 1757. In 1884 these mines were visited by Émile Zola, who based his novel Germinal upon his observations. At the beginning of the twentieth century, the metallurgical industries of the place were extensive, and included iron and copper founding and the manufacture of steam-engines, machinery, chain-cables and a great variety of heavy iron goods. There were also glass-works and breweries.

== Population ==
Historical population

Year	Pop.	±% p.a.
1699	248	—
1731	221	−0.36%
1793	2,982	+4.29%
1800	3,096	+0.54%
1806	3,338	+1.26%
1821	3,863	+0.98%
1831	4,255	+0.97%
1836	4,182	−0.35%
1841	4,191	+0.04%
1846	4,422	+1.08%
1851	5,006	+2.51%
1856	5,855	+3.18%
1861	6,305	+1.49%
1866	7,283	+2.93%
1872	7,990	+1.56%
1876	9,009	+3.05%
1881	10,043	+2.20%
1886	10,656	+1.19%
1891	11,538	+1.60%
1896	12,768	+2.05%

Year	Pop.	±% p.a.
1901	14,444	+2.50%
1906	14,387	−0.08%
1911	14,439	+0.07%
1921	13,790	−0.46%
1926	15,300	+2.10%
1931	16,090	+1.01%
1936	14,804	−1.65%
1946	14,235	−0.39%
1954	15,658	+1.20%
1962	16,275	+0.48%
1968	15,634	−0.67%
1975	14,866	−0.72%
1982	14,602	−0.26%
1990	14,064	−0.47%
1999	14,052	−0.01%
2007	13,843	−0.19%
2012	13,407	−0.64%
2017	13,305	−0.15%
2023	13,183	−0.15%

Source: EHESS (1800-1999) and INSEE (1968-2023)

== Popular culture ==
Bertrand Tavernier directed his film Ça commence aujourd'hui in Anzin in 1999.

== See also ==
- Communes of the Nord department

== Twin cities ==
- Tunisia: Masakin
