= K. A. Soman =

Indian artist

- Born: 5 June 1953 (age 73); Ochanthuruth, Kerala, India
- Other name: Somji
- Occupation: Artist
- Website: Art of Somji

K. A. Soman (born in 1953), also known as Somji, is an artist from Kerala, India.

== Early life ==
His earlier creations include the pieces Defloration, The Ruin of Hitler, The Revolution, S.G. Bila, the Comet.

=== Celebrity Syndrome Series (2008) ===
"Celebrity Syndrome" was the subject of a solo exhibition at Kerala Lalithakala Akademi Art Gallery, Kozhikode in June 2008.

=== "Our Concerns over Time and Space"- 2009) ===
This series premiered at the artist's solo exhibition held at Regional Lalitkala Akademi Art Gallery, Chennai in April 2009. Solo exhibitions with the same title were on display in August 2009 at Kerala Lalitha kala Akademi Art Gallery, Durbar Hall Art Centre, Cochin; at Kerala Lalithakala Akademi Art Gallery, Thrissur, in December 2009; at Vyloppilly Samskrithi Bhavan Art Gallery, Thiruvananthapuram, in April 2010; at Jehangir Art Gallery, Mumbai in Sept. 2010; at Kala Academy Art Gallery, Panaji, Goa in Jan 2011 and at Karnataka Chitrakala Parishath, in Oct 2013.
