= Somain, Nord =

Somain
- Commune
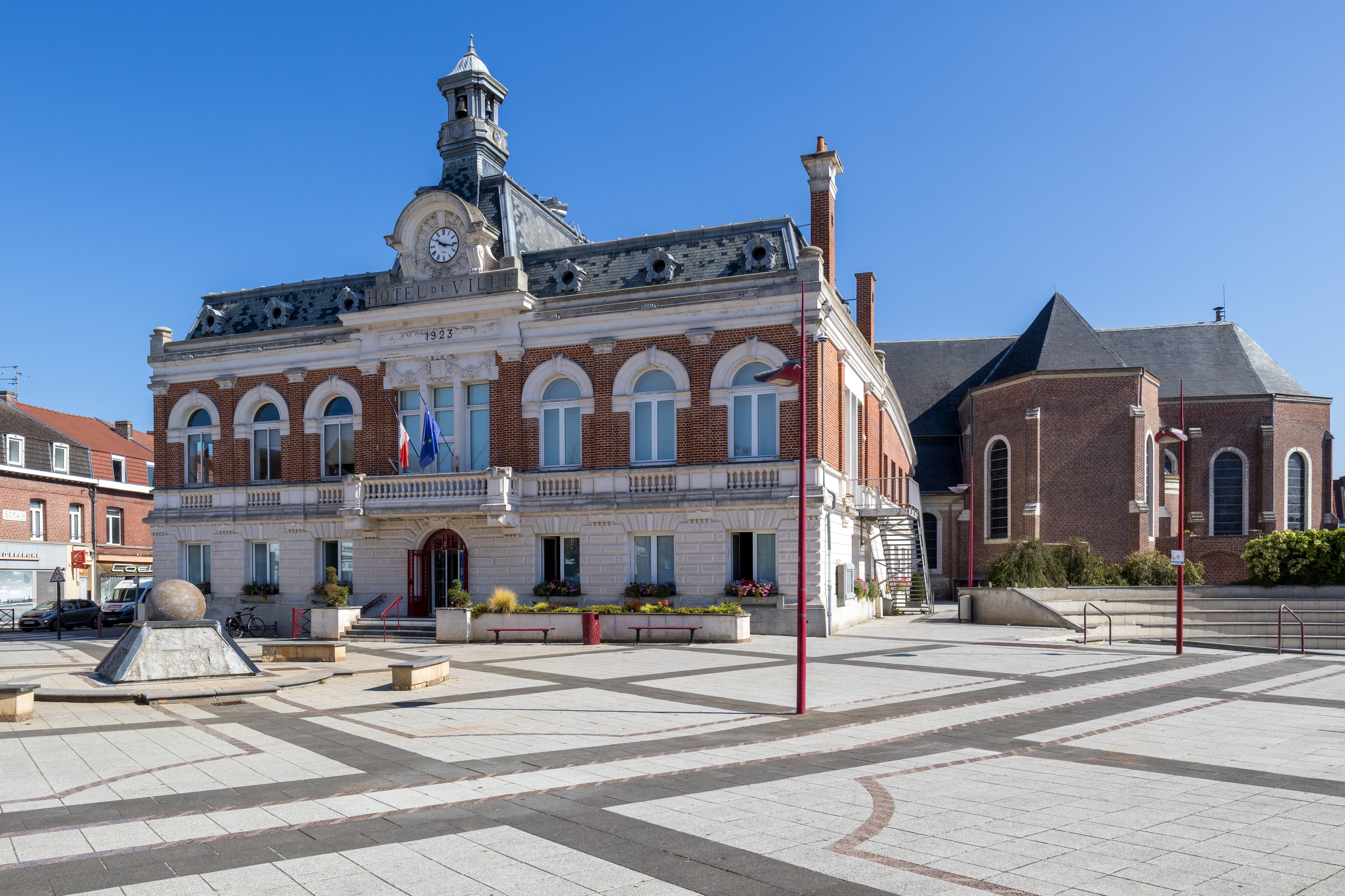
- The town hall in Somain

- Coat of arms
- Location of Somain
- Location within France Location within Hauts-de-France
- Coordinates: 50°21′30″N 3°16′52″E
- Country: France
- Region: Hauts-de-France
- Department: Nord
- Arrondissement: Douai
- Canton: Sin-le-Noble
- Intercommunality: Cœur d'Ostrevent

Government
  - Mayor (2020–2026): Julien Quennesson
- Area^{1}: 12.32 km^{2} (4.76 sq mi)
- Elevation: 32 m (105 ft)
- Highest elevation: 48 m (157 ft)
- Lowest elevation: 16 m (52 ft)
- Population (2023): 11,766
  - Density: 955.0/km^{2} (2,474/sq mi)
- Time zone: UTC+01:00 (CET)
  - Summer (DST): UTC+02:00 (CEST)
- INSEE/Postal code: 59574 /59490
- ^{1} French Land Register data, which excludes lakes, ponds, glaciers > 1 km^{2} (0.386 sq mi or 247 acres) and river estuaries.

Somain (French pronunciation: [sɔmɛ̃]) is a commune in the Nord department in northern France. The former commune of Villers-Campeau was absorbed by Somain in 1947. The town was known for its extensive mining industry.

== Mining ==
Most nearby mines were operated by either the Aniche Mining Company or the Anzin Mining Company.

The Renaissance mine was the first mine. It was opened in the south of the town in 1839. It was soon followed by the St Louis mine, which opened in 1843, and was located a few hundred yards south of the Renaissance mine. The Renaissance mine closed in 1890, and the St Louis mine in 1925.

In 1856, the Anzin Mining Company opened the Casimir Périer mine in the South East of the town, near Fenain and Abscon. Coal extraction ceased at the Casimir Périer mine in 1935, but the mine remained open to allow access to another local pit, the Saint Mark mine.

The Aniche mining company opened the De Sessavalle mine in 1902. The mine closed in 1970.

Nowadays what is kept are the corons, typical mining housing of the region and the area formerly occupied by the De Sessevalle mine got turned into the "Parc d'Activité DeSessevalle" with entreprises opening there.

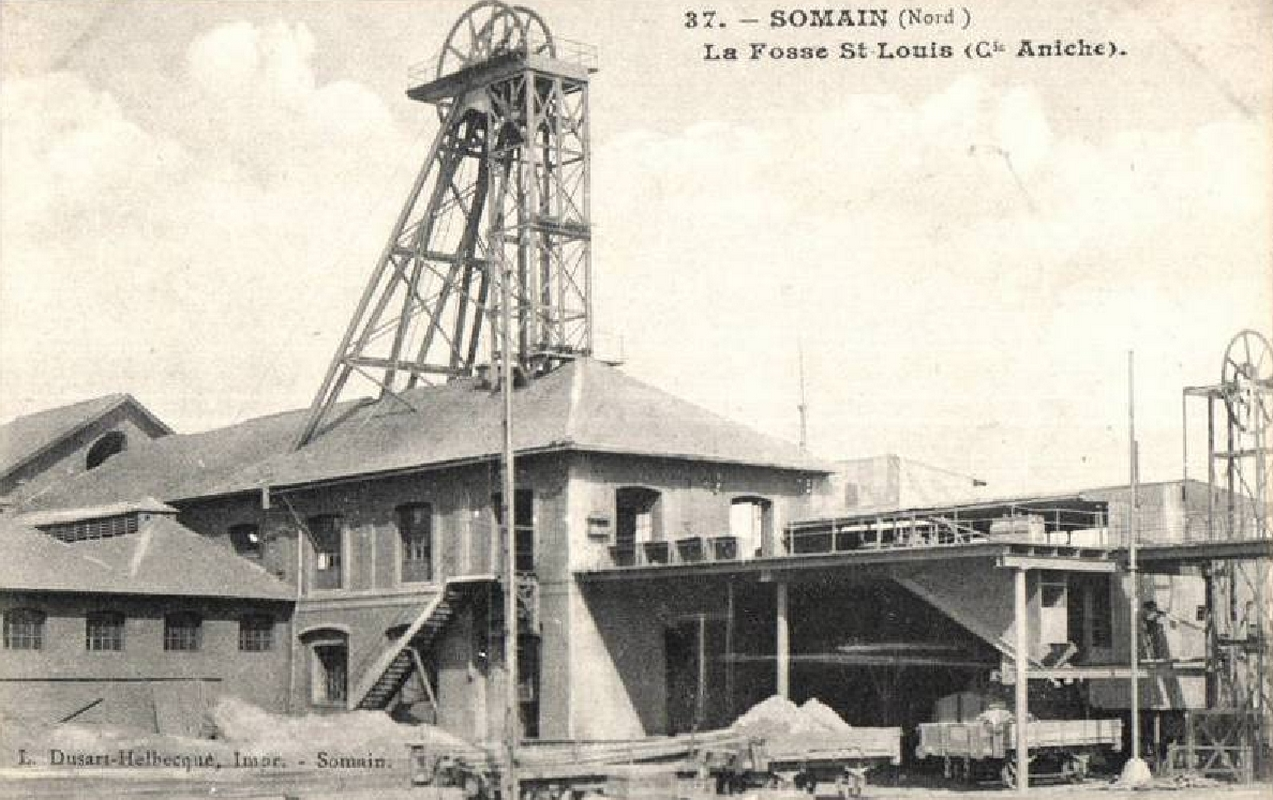
Saint Louis Mine around 1910.

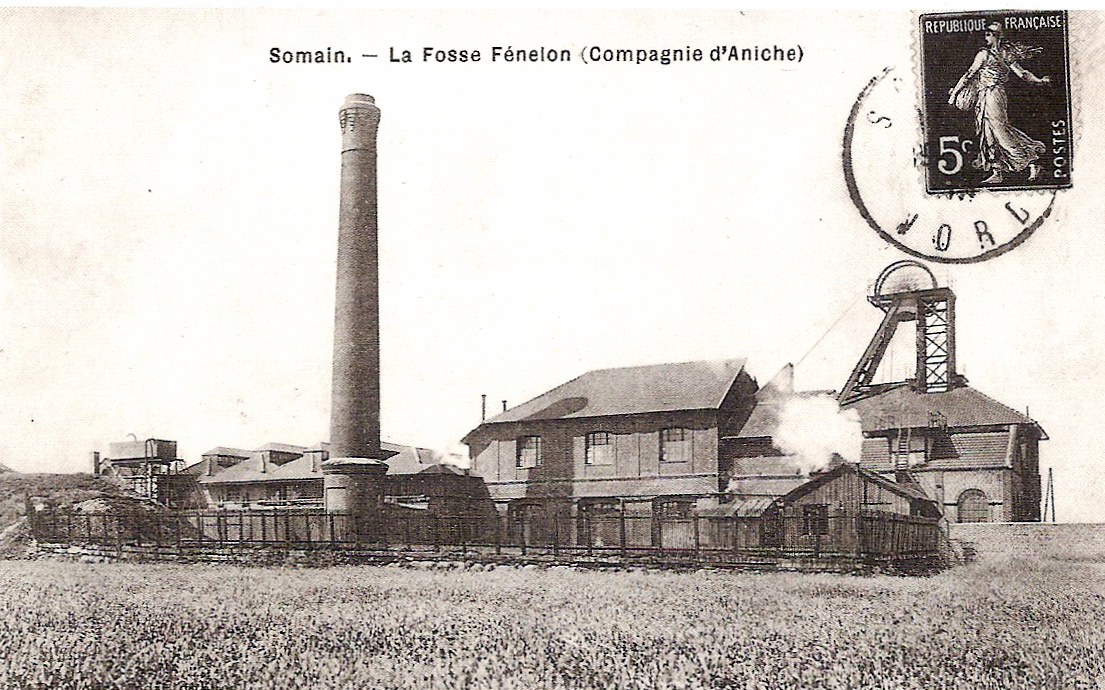
Fénelon mine around 1900.

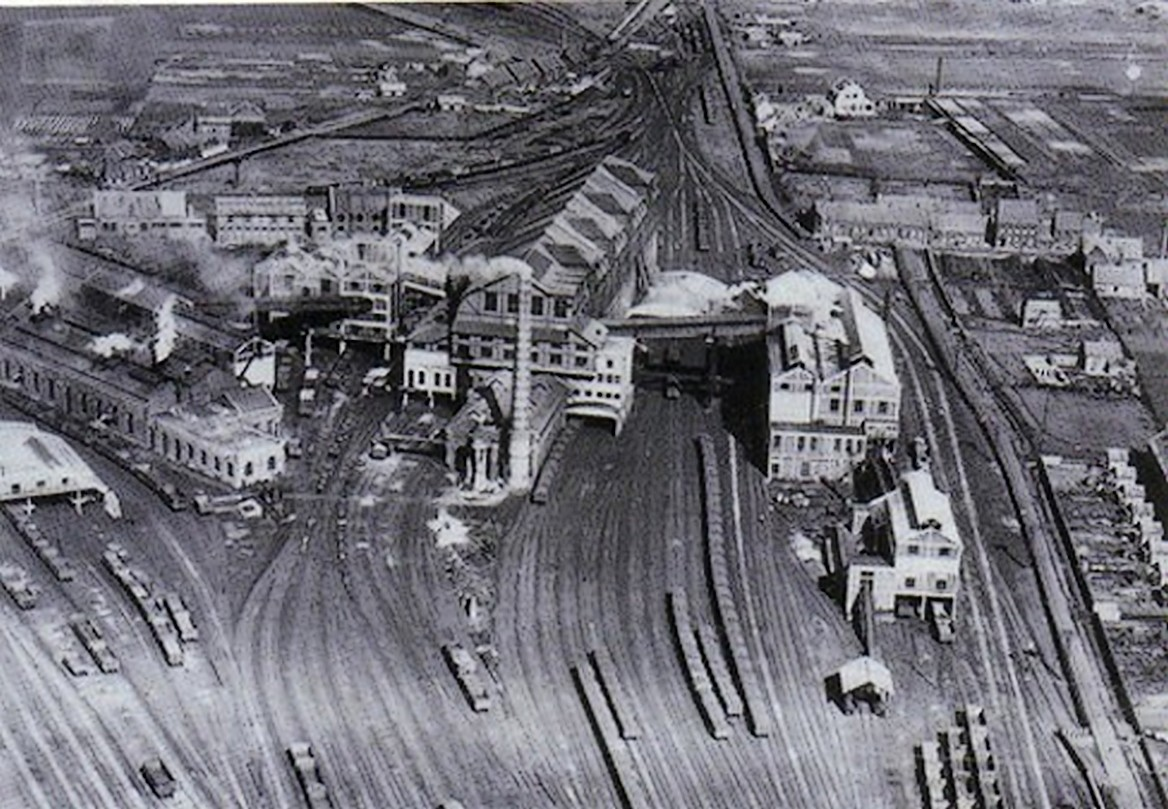
Brickyard owned by the Aniche Mining Company around 1930.

== Transport ==
Somain was previously served by the following rail lines: Somain - Péruwelz, Aubigny-au-Bac - Somain, Somain - Halluin via Orchies, Somain - Douai (Nord), and Somain - Douai (Sud).

== Population ==
Historical population
Year	Pop.	±% p.a.
1968	15,261	—
1975	14,096	−1.13%
1982	12,620	−1.57%
1990	11,971	−0.66%
1999	12,013	+0.04%
2007	12,099	+0.09%
2012	12,838	+1.19%
2017	12,151	−1.09%
2023	11,766	−0.54%
Source: INSEE

== Politics ==
Since 1912, the town has had the following mayors:

- 1912–1945: Victor Bachelet
- 1945–1947: Eugène Dutouquet
- 1947–1952: Victor Bachelet
- 1952–1964: Achille Fleury
- 1964–1977: Marc Demilly
- 1977–??: Jean-Claude Quennesson
- 2020–present: Julien Quennesson (incumbent)

== Education ==
=== Primary schools ===
There are various primary schools in Somain:

- École primaire Louis-Aragon, located in De Sessevalle.
- École primaire Marie-Curie, located in the town center.
- École primaire Désiré-Chevalier, located in Villers-Campeau.
- École primaire Henri-Barbusse, located near the Cheminots estate.
- École primaire Sainte-Anne (private school).

=== Colleges ===
Somain has three colleges:

- Collège Victor-Hugo, located in the town center.
- Collège Louis-Pasteur, located near the Cheminots estate.
- Collège Sainte-Anne, a private college located near the city center.

There are plans to renovate Collège Victor-Hugo to meet HQE standards.

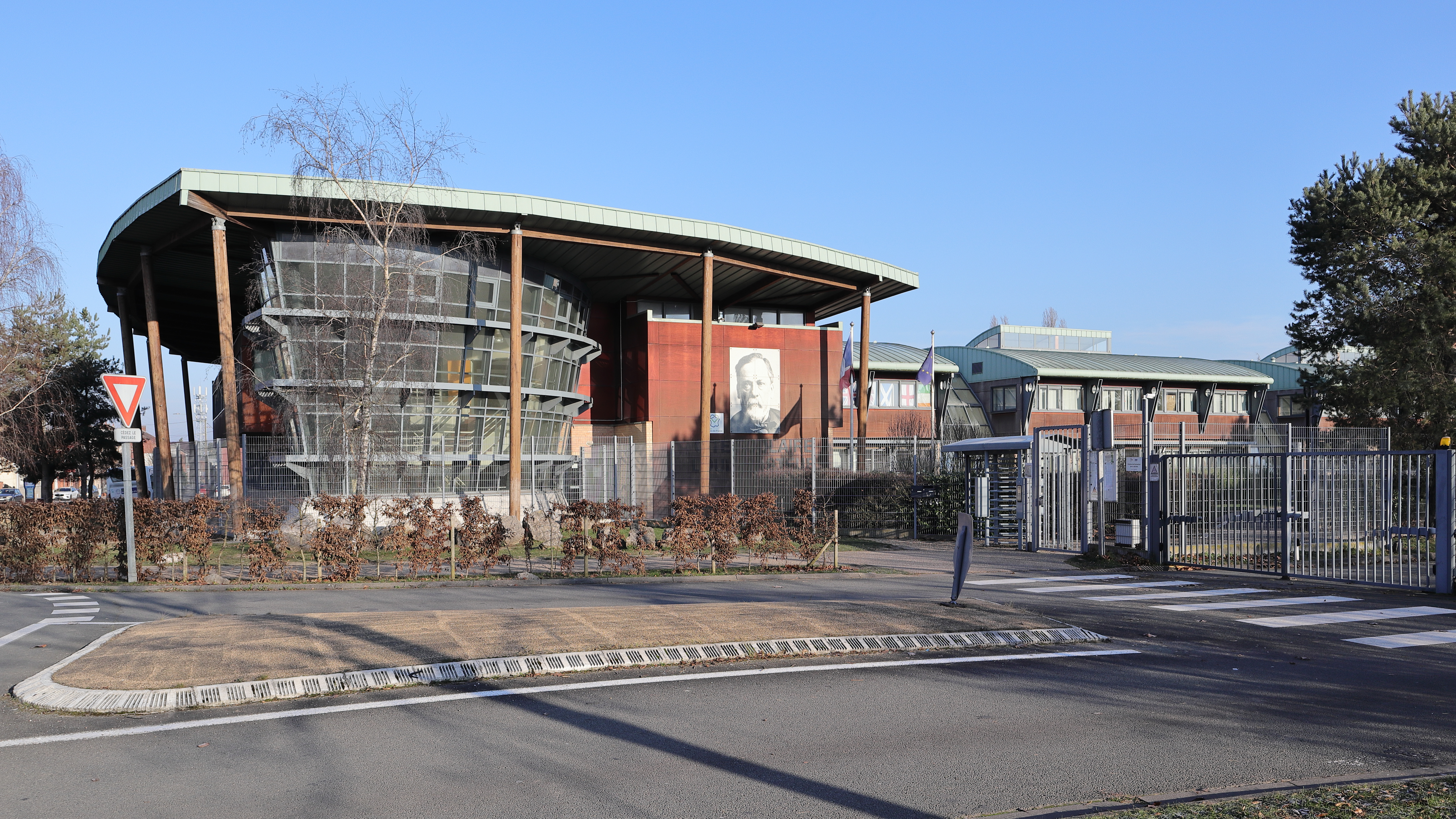
Lycée Louis-Pasteur.

=== Lycées ===
There are two lycées in Somain:

- Lycée général et technologique Louis-Pasteur, located near the Cheminots estate.
- Lycée Hélène-Boucher, a private college located in De Sessevalle.

== See also ==
- Communes of the Nord department

== Twin towns ==
- Castel del Monte, Italy

== Notable people ==
- Michel Sanchez (1957–), musician
