= Władysław Ważny =

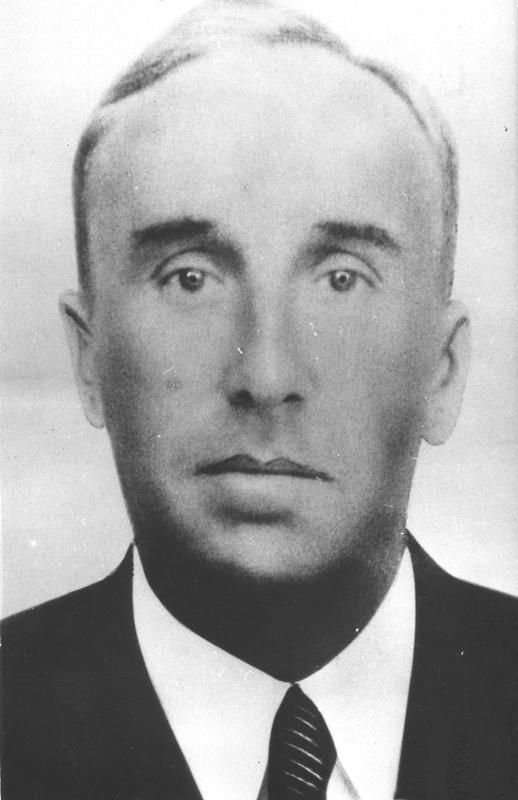
- Born: Władysław Ważny; 3 February 1908; Ruda Różaniecka, Poland
- Died: 19 August 1944 (aged 36); Montigny-en-Ostrevent, France
- Other name: Władysław Rozmus
- Occupation: Special Operations Executive (SOE) agent

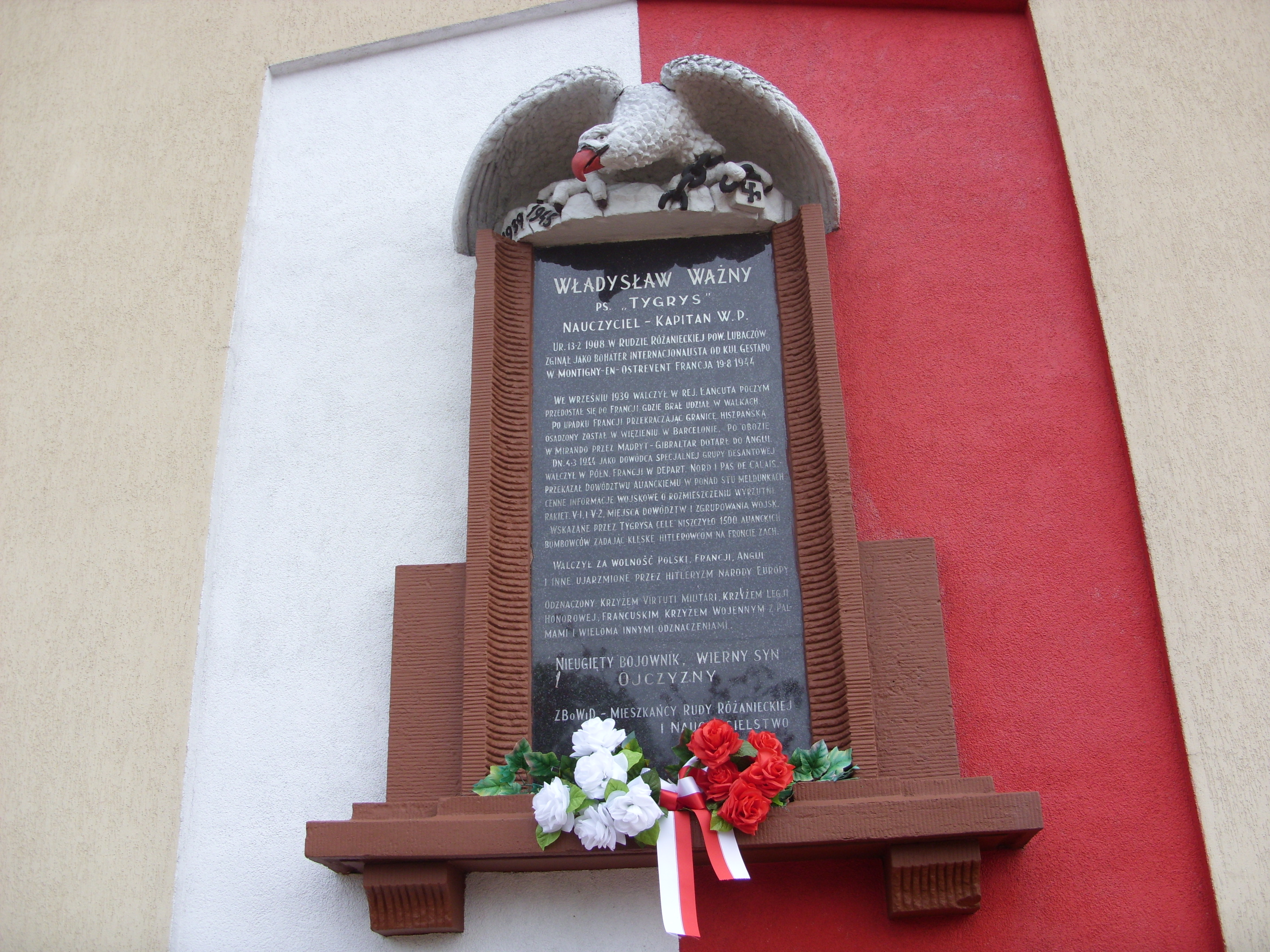
A plaque honoring Władysław Ważny the pseudonym Tiger, teacher and patron of the school in Ruda Różaniecka in Poland

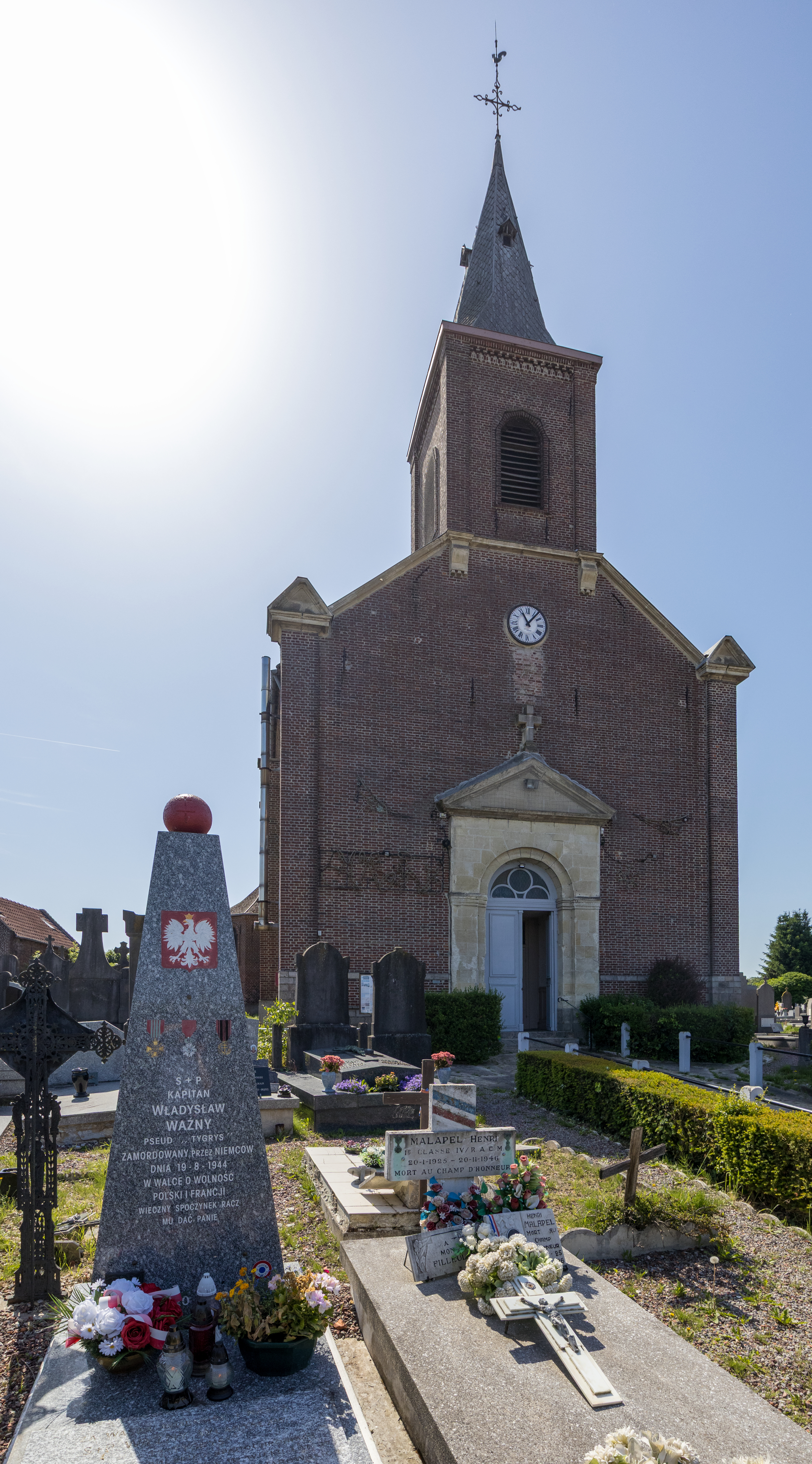
Montigny-en-Ostrevent, France, tomb of Władysław Ważny

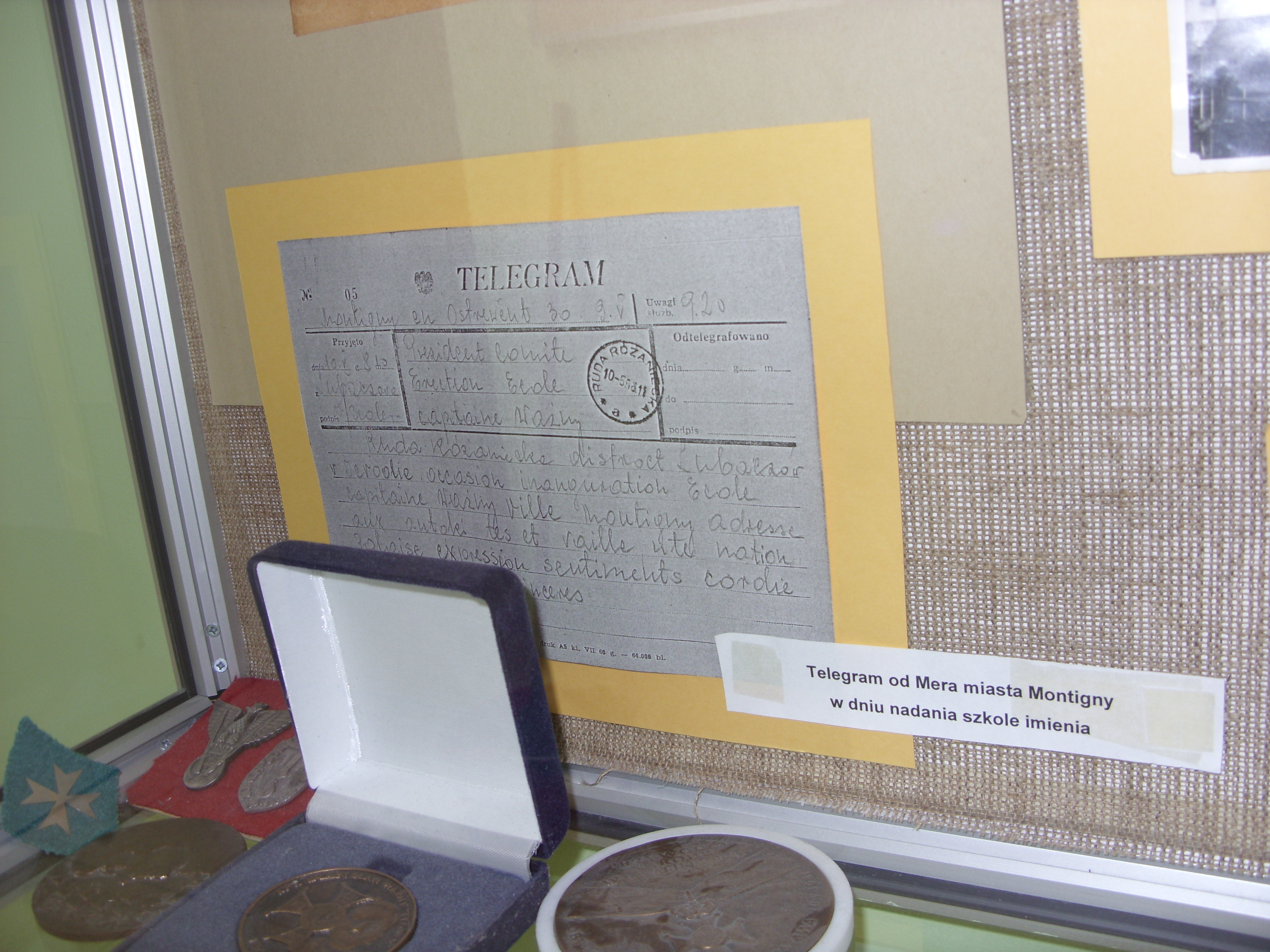
Telegram from the mayor of Montigny-en-Ostrevent. Naming Władysław Ważny "Tiger" school in Ruda Różaniecka, Poland

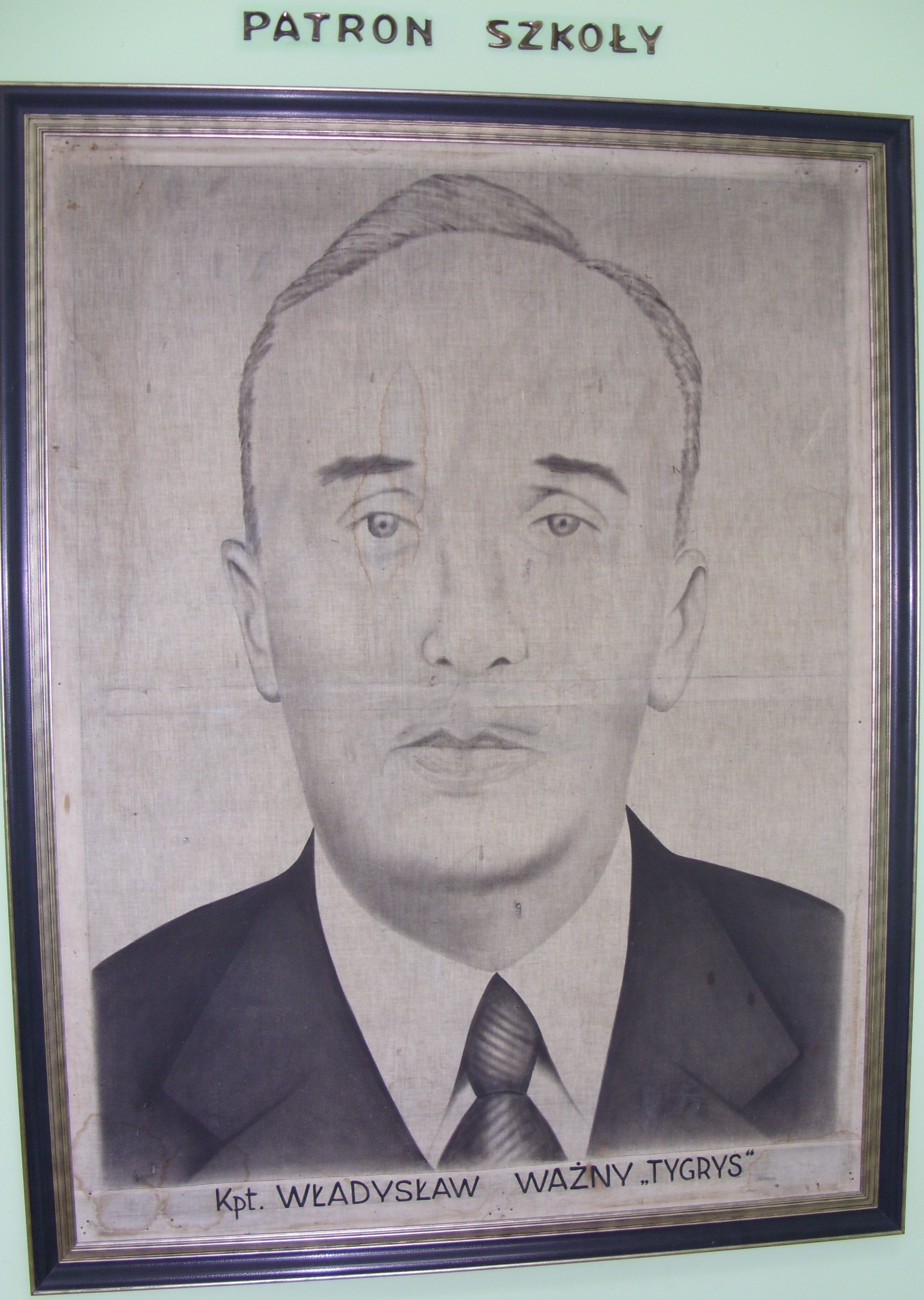
The patron of the school in Ruda Różaniecka, captain Władysław Ważny, "Tiger"

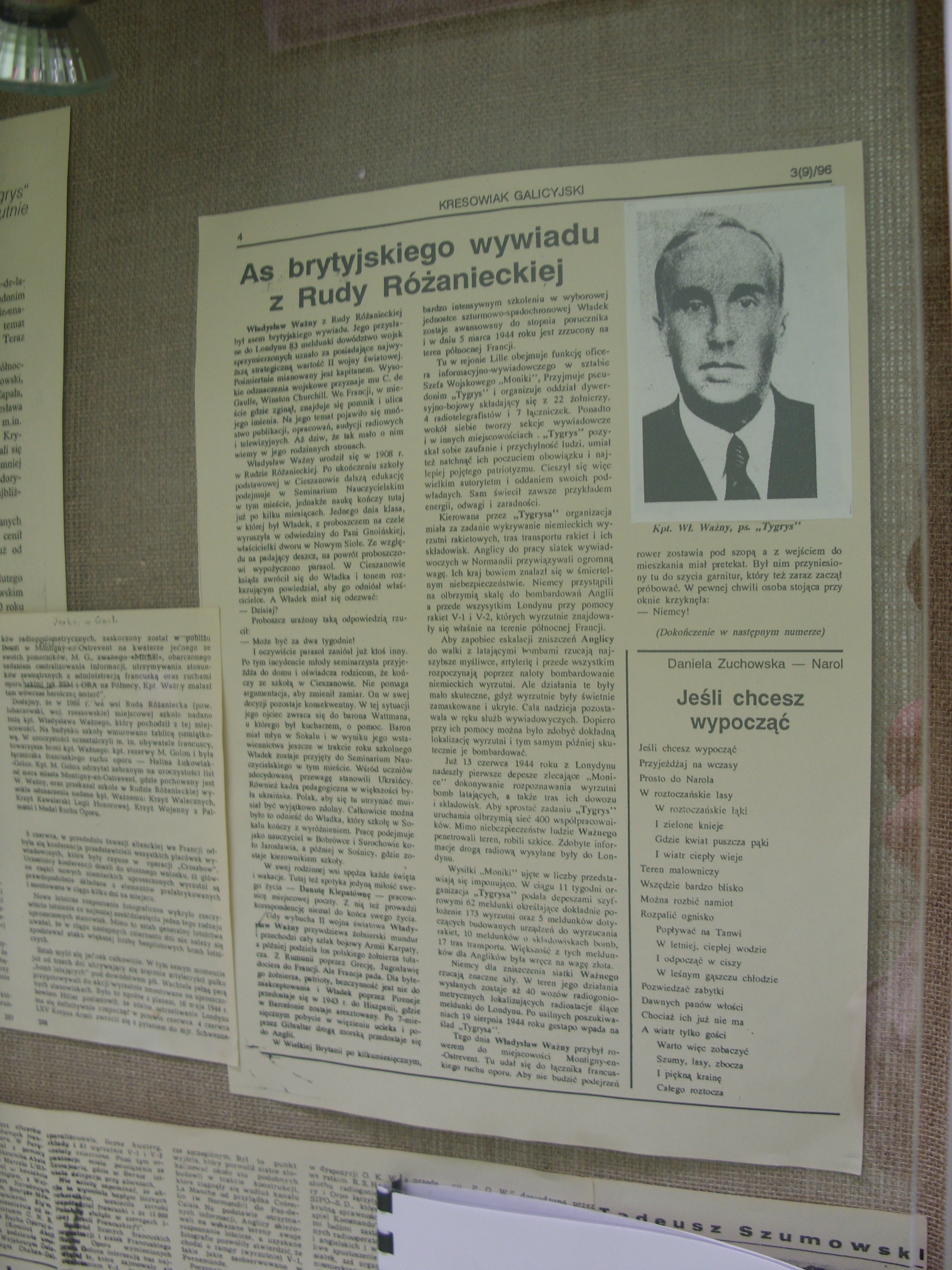
Ace of British Intelligence Władysław Ważny "Tiger", Ruda Różaniecka school in Poland

Władysław Ważny (3 February 1908 – 19 August 1944), also known as Wladyslaw Rozmus and Tiger, was a Polish Army officer and Special Operations Executive agent. He served during World War II. He searched for German V-1 flying bomb and V-2 launchers in occupied France and was an organizer of the French resistance movement.

== Early life ==
Władysław Ważny was born on 3 February 1908 in the village of Ruda Różaniecka to a peasant family. He was the son of Błażej and Maria née Sigłowa and was the oldest of their five daughters and four sons. He attended the teacher's seminary in Cieszanów. After graduating from a teacher's seminary in 1930, he worked as a village teacher in Bobrówka, then in Surochów and in Sośnica near Jarosław, where he became headmaster. In January 1934 he was awarded the rank of second lieutenant in the Polish Army reserve.

== World War II ==
After the outbreak of World War II, he participated in the September campaign as a platoon commander in the 39th Lwów Rifles Infantry Regiment (stationed in Jarosław). After the conquest of Poland by Nazi Germany and Soviet invasion of Poland, in October 1939, he escaped to France, where he joined the emerging Polish Army in France (1939–40). After the Fall of France, along with the 2nd Rifle Division (Poland), he journeyed to an internment camp in Switzerland. He escaped and traveled through France to Spain. He was arrested in the Pyrenees.

From 21 January to 25 July 1943 he was imprisoned in Barcelona. He was transferred to the concentration camp in Miranda de Ebro. He escaped on 20 August 1943 and reached Gibraltar and England. He was sent to Commando Training Center in Camusdarach in Scotland He underwent a parachuting course in Ringway, Manchester and trained for the Cichociemni (Silent Unseen). He was to fly to Poland, but was instead sent to POWN in France (Polish Organization for the Struggle for Independence) by military chief Antoni Zdrojewski. He became deputy commander of the "North" District (Nord) using pseudonym "Eugenie" and head of the intelligence network "Monika W."

His task was to create an intelligence network in occupied France, gathering information about the location of Nazi troops, their forces and movements. After landing in March 1944 in France, the most important intelligence was information about the V-1 flying bomb and V-2 rocket launchers deployed in Nord and Pas-de-Calais. Ważny issued the first report about them on 11 June 1944. He made contact with Capt. Michał Golon. Thanks to collaborators, mostly from the local Polish population, but also from the French, he broadcast 182 radio reports to London about the location of 173 V-1 launchers, 5 V-2 launchers and 17 transport information missiles. The effect of his work was the bombing of 162 German V1 launchers by Allied aircraft. As many as 83 of his reports were marked by the Allied High Command as of the highest value. Ważny discovered 59 launchers and obtained a detailed plan of one of them, which he urgently forwarded to Great Britain. His intelligence grid yielded information that destroyed two landing ramps for flying bombs, levers in Douai, the aircraft engine factory in Albert. When it was destroyed, a freight train with 200 aircraft engines was also demolished. Ważny found that in the Mimoyecques area (English Channel area) the Germans began building a V-3 missile launcher. Over 40 German radiogoniometric cars were searching for the "Tiger". Ważny's collaborator, Mieczysław Golon, believed that the RAF bunkers and V1 launchers were destroyed four hours after Tiger sent his report.

== Death and burial ==
Ważny died shortly before the liberation of northern France during an attempted arrest by the Nazis. Ważny opened fire on the Gestapo men, killing several of them. However, he was shot several times with a submachine gun while trying to escape. His death was surrounded by ambiguity. The fact that his death occurred quickly seemed to confirm that he could have taken poison that he carried with him. His activity and struggle in France saved thousands of inhabitants of Great Britain. He is buried in the cemetery of Montigny-en-Ostrevent in France.

== Recognition ==
He was posthumously promoted to captain. Honors Władysław Ważny received posthumously in 1946 include:

in France:

- Legion of Honour V Class
- Croix de Guerre
- Resistance Medal (Médaille de la Résistance française)

in Poland:

- Virtuti Militari Silver Cross - Class V
- Cross of Valour (Poland)
- Cross of Merit with Swords (Poland)
- Krzyż Czynu Bojowego Polskich Sił Zbrojnych na Zachodzie (Cross of Combat Action of the Polish Armed Forces in the West)
- Medal „Za udział w wojnie obronnej 1939” (Medal "For participating in the defensive war of 1939")

British Prime Minister Winston Churchill, speaking to the House of Commons of the United Kingdom in February 1946, paid tribute to him and his intelligence network.

Ważny, was a Polish agent of the British Special Operations Executive (SOE), a forgotten hero who was never decorated by the British Ministry of Defense and British authorities.

Virtuti Militari Silver Cross - V Class	Legion of Honour	Croix de Guerre (France)	Resistance Medal
Cross of Valour (Poland)	Cross of Merit with Swords (Poland)	Krzyż Czynu Bojowego Polskich Sił Zbrojnych na Zachodzie	Medal „Za udział w wojnie obronnej 1939”

== Legacy ==
In 1955, in Montigny-en-Ostrevent, where he died, a street was named after him: "Rue du Capitaine Wazny". A monument was erected at the local cemetery. In 1966 he became the patron of a school in his hometown Ruda Różaniecka.

For the 50th anniversary of his tragic death, ceremonial celebrations and an exhibition were organized in Montigny-en-Ostrevent. TVP prepared a 35-minute film, broadcast by TVP Polonia and TVP Historia.

== Private life ==
His only love was Danuta Klepatówna from Ruda Różaniecka, a postal worker with whom he corresponded until the end of his life.

== See also ==
- Polish resistance in France during World War II
- Polska Organizacja Walki o Niepodległość (Polish Organization for the Fight for Independence)
- Roman Czerniawski
- List of Poles
- Krystyna Skarbek
