= Abscon =

- Commune
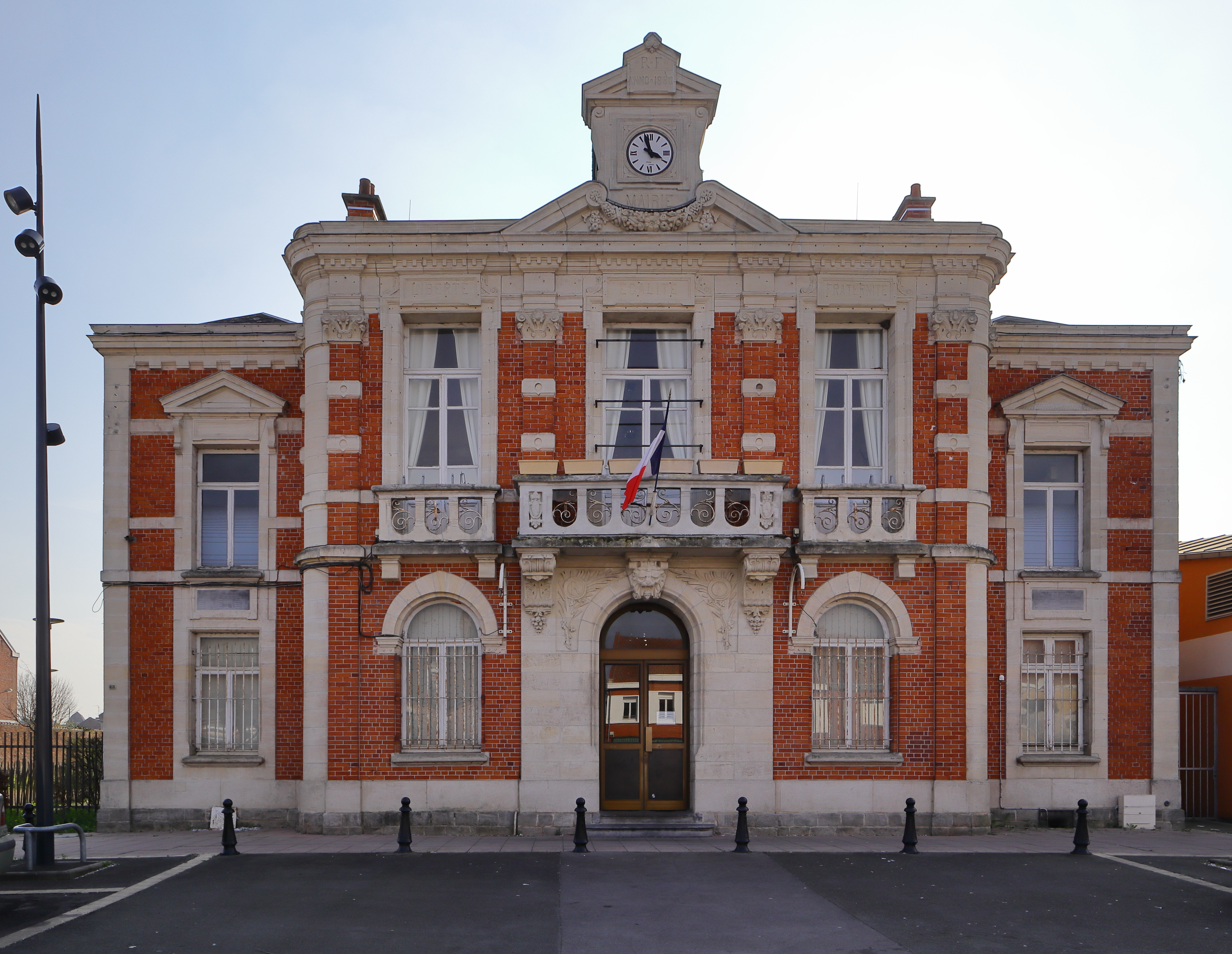
- Town hall

- Coat of arms
- Location of Abscon
- Location within France Location within Hauts-de-France
- Coordinates: 50°20′05″N 3°18′10″E
- Country: France
- Region: Hauts-de-France
- Department: Nord
- Arrondissement: Valenciennes
- Canton: Denain
- Intercommunality: Porte du Hainaut

Government
  - Mayor (2020–2026): Patrick Kowalczyk
- Area^{1}: 7.27 km^{2} (2.81 sq mi)
- Elevation: 59 m (194 ft)
- Highest elevation: 64 m (210 ft)
- Lowest elevation: 38 m (125 ft)
- Population (2023): 4,108
  - Density: 565/km^{2} (1,460/sq mi)
- Demonym(s): Absconnais, Absconnaises
- Time zone: UTC+01:00 (CET)
  - Summer (DST): UTC+02:00 (CEST)
- INSEE/Postal code: 59002 /59215
- ^{1} French Land Register data, which excludes lakes, ponds, glaciers > 1 km^{2} (0.386 sq mi or 247 acres) and river estuaries.

Abscon (French pronunciation: [apskɔ̃]) is a commune in the Nord department in northern France.

== Population ==
Historical population

Year	Pop.	±% p.a.
1800	425	—
1806	502	+2.81%
1821	675	+1.99%
1831	939	+3.36%
1836	997	+1.21%
1841	1,221	+4.14%
1846	1,344	+1.94%
1851	1,464	+1.73%
1856	1,630	+2.17%
1861	1,608	−0.27%
1866	1,650	+0.52%
1872	2,280	+5.54%
1876	2,745	+4.75%
1881	2,996	+1.77%
1886	2,948	−0.32%
1891	2,810	−0.95%
1896	2,919	+0.76%
1901	2,912	−0.05%

Year	Pop.	±% p.a.
1906	3,053	+0.95%
1911	3,250	+1.26%
1921	3,150	−0.31%
1926	4,359	+6.71%
1931	4,308	−0.24%
1936	4,244	−0.30%
1946	4,289	+0.11%
1954	4,445	+0.45%
1962	4,819	+1.01%
1968	4,899	+0.27%
1975	4,636	−0.79%
1982	4,213	−1.36%
1990	3,954	−0.79%
1999	4,135	+0.50%
2007	4,202	+0.20%
2012	4,276	+0.35%
2017	4,447	+0.79%
2023	4,108	−1.31%

Source: EHESS (1800-1999) and INSEE

== Heraldry ==
Arms of Abscon	The arms of Abscon are blazoned : Or, on an escarbuncle sable a ruby gules. (Abscon, Beuvry-la-Forêt, Erre, Fenain, Marchiennes, Ronchin, Tilloy-lez-Marchiennes and Wandignies-Hamage use the same arms.)

== See also ==
- Communes of the Nord department
