= Beuvry-la-Forêt =

- Commune
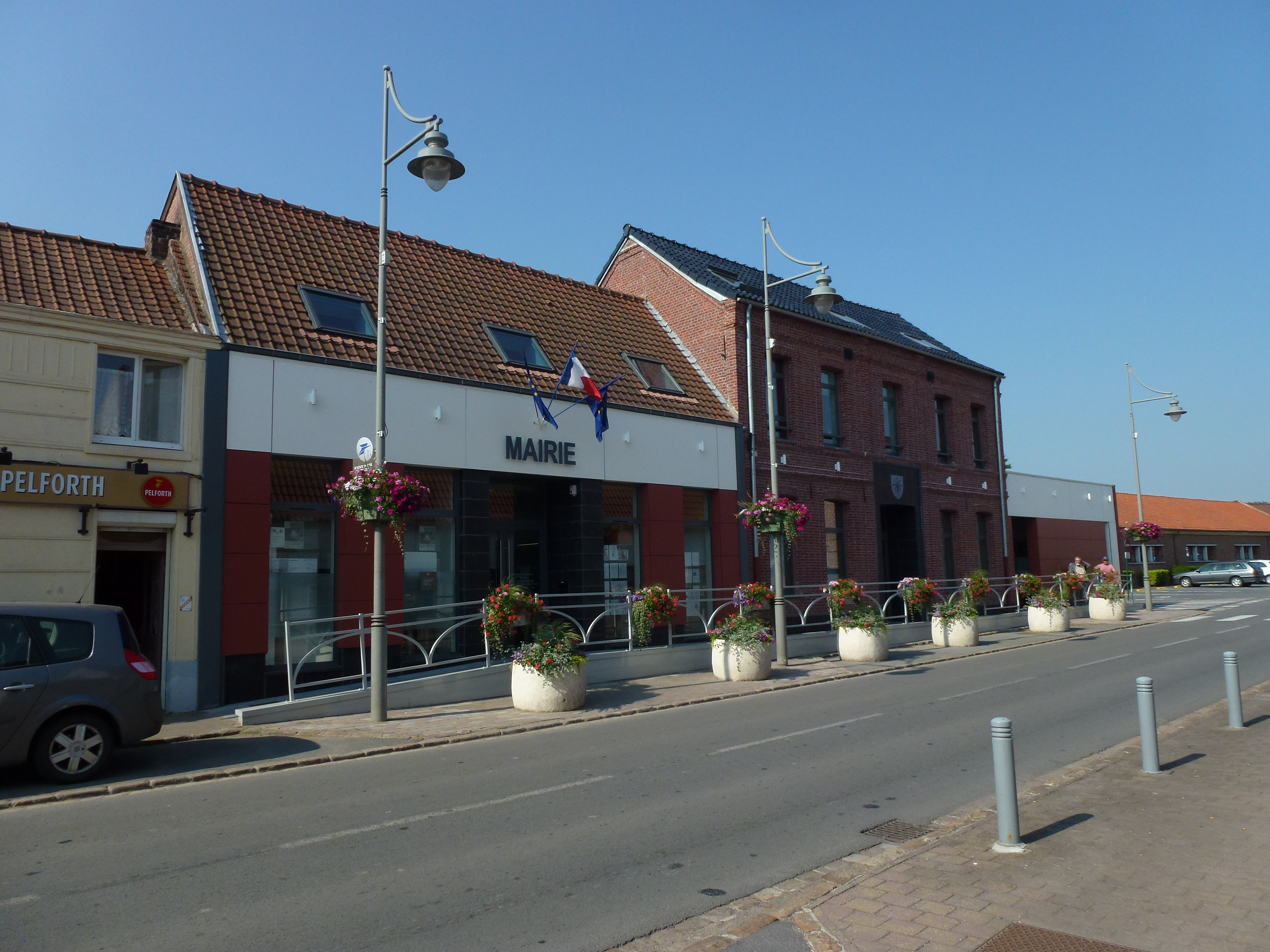
- Beuvry-la-Forêt Town Hall

- Coat of arms
- Location of Beuvry-la-Forêt
- Location within France Location within Hauts-de-France
- Coordinates: 50°27′36″N 3°17′16″E
- Country: France
- Region: Hauts-de-France
- Department: Nord
- Arrondissement: Douai
- Canton: Orchies
- Intercommunality: Pévèle-Carembault

Government
  - Mayor (2020–2026): Thierry Bridault
- Area^{1}: 12.52 km^{2} (4.83 sq mi)
- Elevation: 21 m (69 ft)
- Highest elevation: 35 m (115 ft)
- Lowest elevation: 14 m (46 ft)
- Population (2023): 2,861
  - Density: 228.5/km^{2} (591.8/sq mi)
- Time zone: UTC+01:00 (CET)
  - Summer (DST): UTC+02:00 (CEST)
- INSEE/Postal code: 59080 /59310
- ^{1} French Land Register data, which excludes lakes, ponds, glaciers > 1 km^{2} (0.386 sq mi or 247 acres) and river estuaries.

Beuvry-la-Forêt (French pronunciation: [bøvʁi la fɔʁɛ]) is a commune in the Nord department in northern France.

== Population ==
Historical population

Year	Pop.	±% p.a.
1793	1,631	—
1821	1,946	+0.63%
1846	1,990	+0.09%
1872	1,871	−0.24%
1901	1,718	−0.29%
1926	1,690	−0.07%
1946	1,647	−0.13%
1962	1,814	+0.61%
1968	1,804	−0.09%

Year	Pop.	±% p.a.
1975	1,869	+0.51%
1982	2,175	+2.19%
1990	2,337	+0.90%
1999	2,762	+1.87%
2007	2,828	+0.30%
2012	2,756	−0.51%
2017	2,758	+0.01%
2023	2,861	+0.61%

Source: EHESS and INSEE (1968-2023)

== Heraldry ==
Arms of Beuvry-la-Forêt	The arms of Beuvry-la-Forêt are blazoned : Or, on an escarbuncle sable a ruby gules. (Abscon, Beuvry-la-Forêt, Erre, Fenain, Marchiennes, Ronchin, Tilloy-lez-Marchiennes and Wandignies-Hamage use the same arms.)

== See also ==
- Communes of the Nord department
