= Fenain =

- Commune
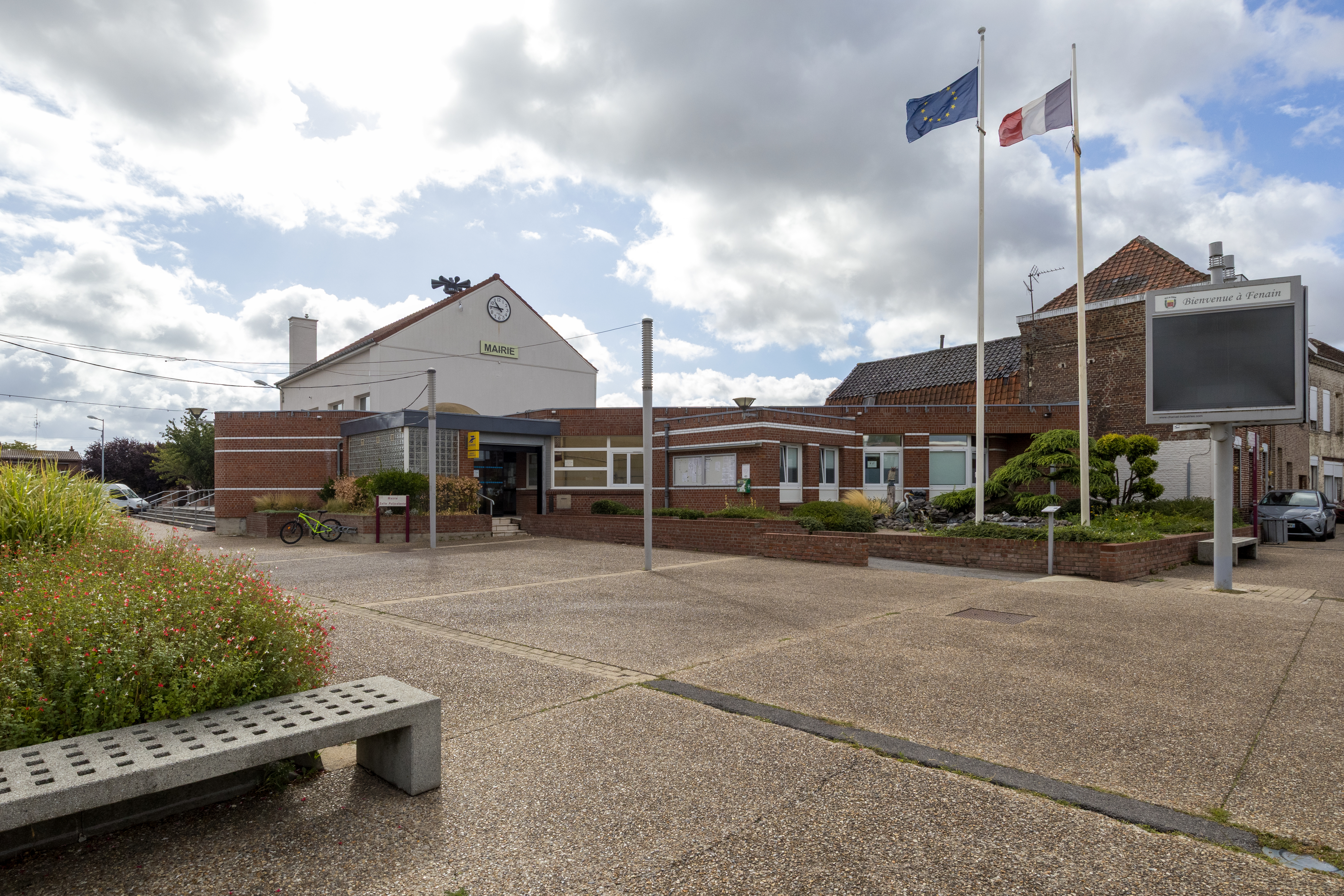
- Town hall of Fenain

- Coat of arms
- Location of Fenain
- Location within France Location within Hauts-de-France
- Coordinates: 50°21′59″N 3°18′05″E
- Country: France
- Region: Hauts-de-France
- Department: Nord
- Arrondissement: Douai
- Canton: Sin-le-Noble
- Intercommunality: Cœur d'Ostrevent

Government
  - Mayor (2025–2026): Fabien Bouriez
- Area^{1}: 5.78 km^{2} (2.23 sq mi)
- Elevation: 21 m (69 ft)
- Highest elevation: 47 m (154 ft)
- Lowest elevation: 16 m (52 ft)
- Population (2023): 5,441
  - Density: 941/km^{2} (2,440/sq mi)
- Time zone: UTC+01:00 (CET)
  - Summer (DST): UTC+02:00 (CEST)
- INSEE/Postal code: 59227 /59179
- ^{1} French Land Register data, which excludes lakes, ponds, glaciers > 1 km^{2} (0.386 sq mi or 247 acres) and river estuaries.

Fenain (French pronunciation: [fənɛ̃]) is a commune in the Nord department in northern France.

== Population ==
Historical population
Year	Pop.	±% p.a.
1968	5,462	—
1975	6,270	+1.99%
1982	5,755	−1.22%
1990	5,639	−0.25%
1999	5,365	−0.55%
2007	5,350	−0.03%
2012	5,337	−0.05%
2017	5,385	+0.18%
2023	5,441	+0.17%
Source: INSEE

== Heraldry ==
Arms of Fenain	The arms of Fenain are blazoned : Or, on an escarbuncle sable a ruby gules. (Abscon, Beuvry-la-Forêt, Erre, Fenain, Marchiennes, Ronchin, Tilloy-lez-Marchiennes and Wandignies-Hamage use the same arms.)

== See also ==
- Communes of the Nord department
