= Wandignies-Hamage =

- Commune
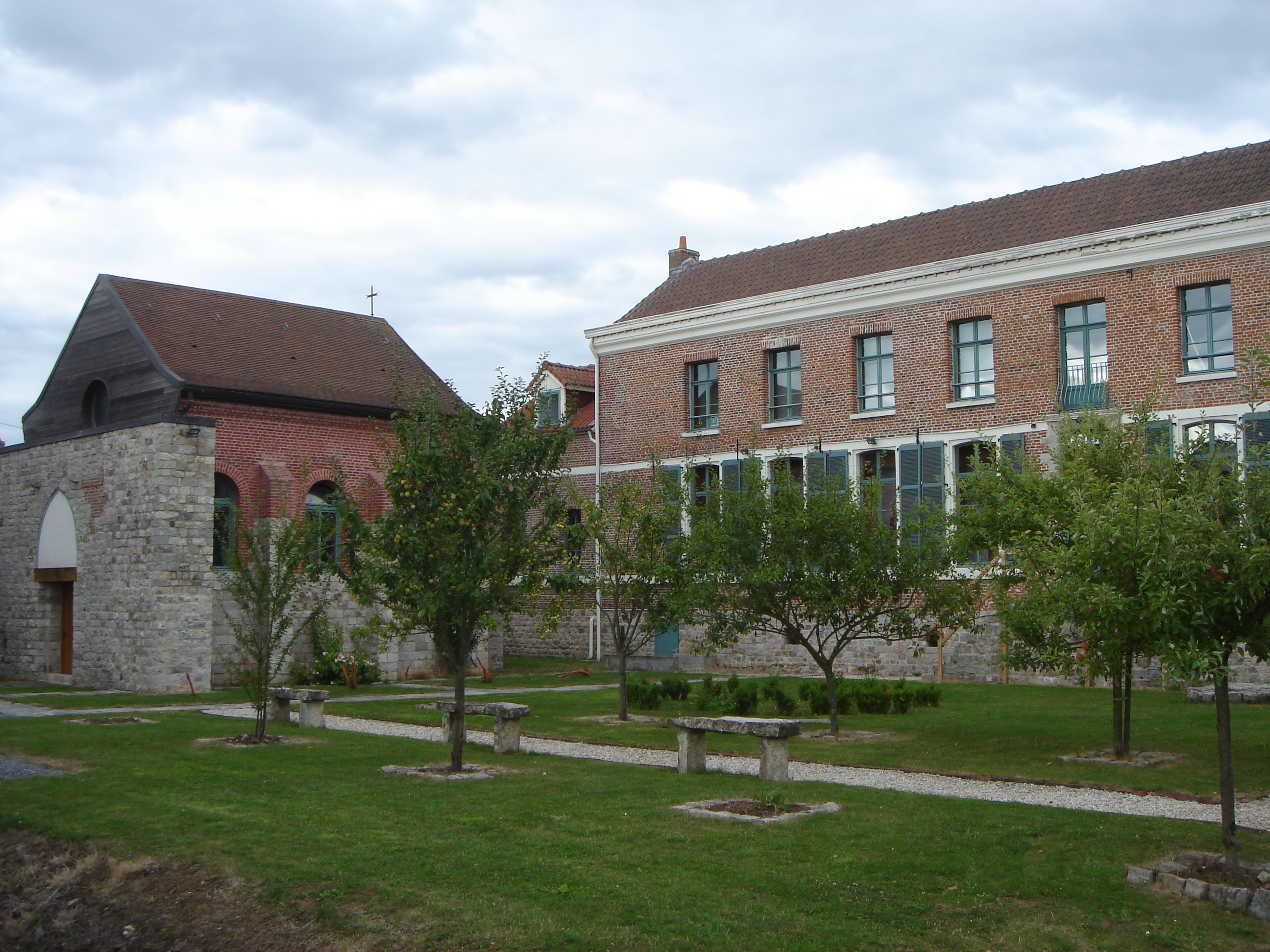
- The Abbey of Hamage

- Coat of arms
- Location of Wandignies-Hamage
- Location within France Location within Hauts-de-France
- Coordinates: 50°24′01″N 3°18′55″E
- Country: France
- Region: Hauts-de-France
- Department: Nord
- Arrondissement: Douai
- Canton: Sin-le-Noble
- Intercommunality: Cœur d'Ostrevent

Government
  - Mayor (2020–2026): Jean-Michel Sieczkarek
- Area^{1}: 6.3 km^{2} (2.4 sq mi)
- Elevation: 18 m (59 ft)
- Highest elevation: 21 m (69 ft)
- Lowest elevation: 15 m (49 ft)
- Population (2023): 1,301
  - Density: 210/km^{2} (530/sq mi)
- Time zone: UTC+01:00 (CET)
  - Summer (DST): UTC+02:00 (CEST)
- INSEE/Postal code: 59637 /59870
- ^{1} French Land Register data, which excludes lakes, ponds, glaciers > 1 km^{2} (0.386 sq mi or 247 acres) and river estuaries.

Wandignies-Hamage (French pronunciation: [wɑ̃diɲi amaʒ]) is a commune in the Nord department in northern France.

== Heraldry ==
Arms of Wandignies-Hamage	The arms of Wandignies-Hamage are blazoned : Or, on an escarbuncle sable a ruby gules. (Abscon, Beuvry-la-Forêt, Erre, Fenain, Marchiennes, Ronchin, Tilloy-lez-Marchiennes and Wandignies-Hamage use the same arms.)

== Population ==
Historical population
Year	Pop.	±% p.a.
1968	1,013	—
1975	1,016	+0.04%
1982	1,070	+0.74%
1990	1,114	+0.51%
1999	1,123	+0.09%
2007	1,196	+0.79%
2012	1,254	+0.95%
2017	1,302	+0.75%
2023	1,301	−0.01%
Source: INSEE

== See also ==
- Communes of the Nord department
