= Ronchin =

- Commune
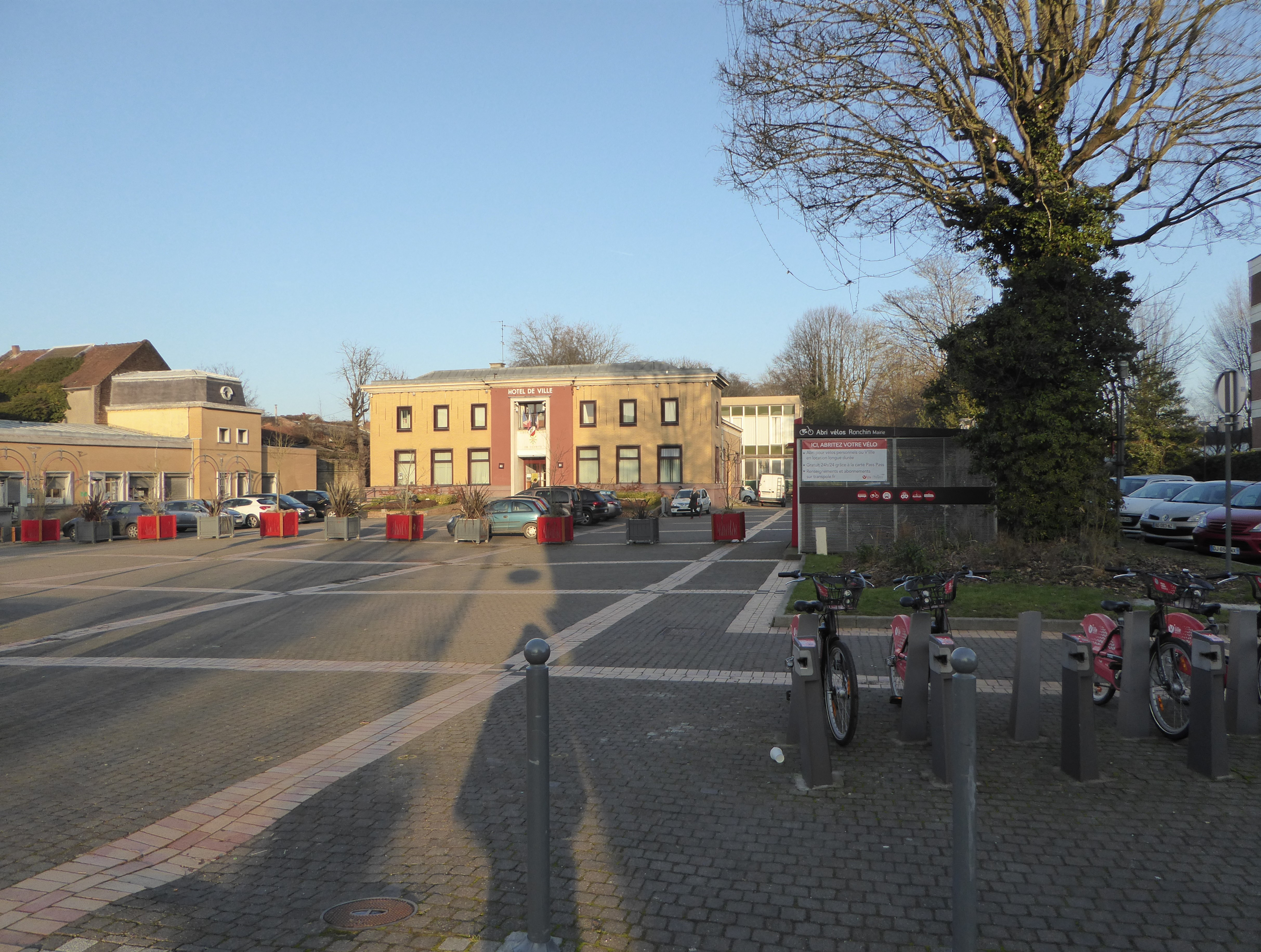
- The town hall in Ronchin

- Coat of arms
- Location of Ronchin
- Location within France Location within Hauts-de-France
- Coordinates: 50°36′19″N 3°05′19″E
- Country: France
- Region: Hauts-de-France
- Department: Nord
- Arrondissement: Lille
- Canton: Lille-4
- Intercommunality: Métropole Européenne de Lille

Government
  - Mayor (2026–32): Ulric Vanacker
- Area^{1}: 5.42 km^{2} (2.09 sq mi)
- Elevation: 40 m (130 ft)
- Highest elevation: 57 m (187 ft)
- Lowest elevation: 28 m (92 ft)
- Population (2023): 19,787
  - Density: 3,650/km^{2} (9,460/sq mi)
- Time zone: UTC+01:00 (CET)
  - Summer (DST): UTC+02:00 (CEST)
- INSEE/Postal code: 59507 /59790
- ^{1} French Land Register data, which excludes lakes, ponds, glaciers > 1 km^{2} (0.386 sq mi or 247 acres) and river estuaries.

Ronchin (French pronunciation: [ʁɔ̃ʃɛ̃]) is a commune in the Nord department, Hauts-de-France, France. It is part of the European Metropolis of Lille.

== Population ==
Historical population
Year	Pop.	±% p.a.
1968	14,030	—
1975	15,319	+1.26%
1982	17,367	+1.81%
1990	17,937	+0.40%
1999	17,999	+0.04%
2007	18,614	+0.42%
2012	18,398	−0.23%
2017	19,220	+0.88%
2023	19,787	+0.49%
Source: INSEE

== Heraldry ==
Arms of Ronchin	The arms of Ronchin are blazoned : Or, on an escarbuncle sable a ruby gules. (Abscon, Beuvry-la-Forêt, Erre, Fenain, Marchiennes, Ronchin, Tilloy-lez-Marchiennes and Wandignies-Hamage use the same arms.)

== See also ==
- Communes of the Nord department
