= Bruille-lez-Marchiennes =

- Commune
- The town hall

- Coat of arms
- Location of Bruille-lez-Marchiennes
- Location within France Location within Hauts-de-France
- Coordinates: 50°21′34″N 3°14′41″E
- Country: France
- Region: Hauts-de-France
- Department: Nord
- Arrondissement: Douai
- Canton: Sin-le-Noble
- Intercommunality: Cœur d'Ostrevent

Government
  - Mayor (2020–2026): Jean-Jacques Candelier
- Area^{1}: 4.33 km^{2} (1.67 sq mi)
- Elevation: 28 m (92 ft)
- Highest elevation: 34 m (112 ft)
- Lowest elevation: 20 m (66 ft)
- Population (2023): 1,340
  - Density: 309/km^{2} (802/sq mi)
- Time zone: UTC+01:00 (CET)
  - Summer (DST): UTC+02:00 (CEST)
- INSEE/Postal code: 59113 /59490
- ^{1} French Land Register data, which excludes lakes, ponds, glaciers > 1 km^{2} (0.386 sq mi or 247 acres) and river estuaries.

Bruille-lez-Marchiennes (French pronunciation: [bʁɥij lɛ maʁʃjɛn], literally Bruille near Marchiennes) is a commune in the Nord department in northern France.

== Population ==
Historical population
Year	Pop.	±% p.a.
1968	1,092	—
1975	1,034	−0.78%
1982	1,041	+0.10%
1990	1,129	+1.02%
1999	1,213	+0.80%
2007	1,316	+1.02%
2012	1,327	+0.17%
2017	1,345	+0.27%
2023	1,340	−0.06%
Source: INSEE

== Heraldry ==
Arms of Bruille-lez-Marchiennes	The arms of Bruille-lez-Marchiennes are blazoned : Argent, a cross engrailed gules. (Bruille-lez-Marchiennes and Écaillon use the same arms.)

== See also ==
- Communes of the Nord department
