= Tilloy-lez-Marchiennes =

- Commune
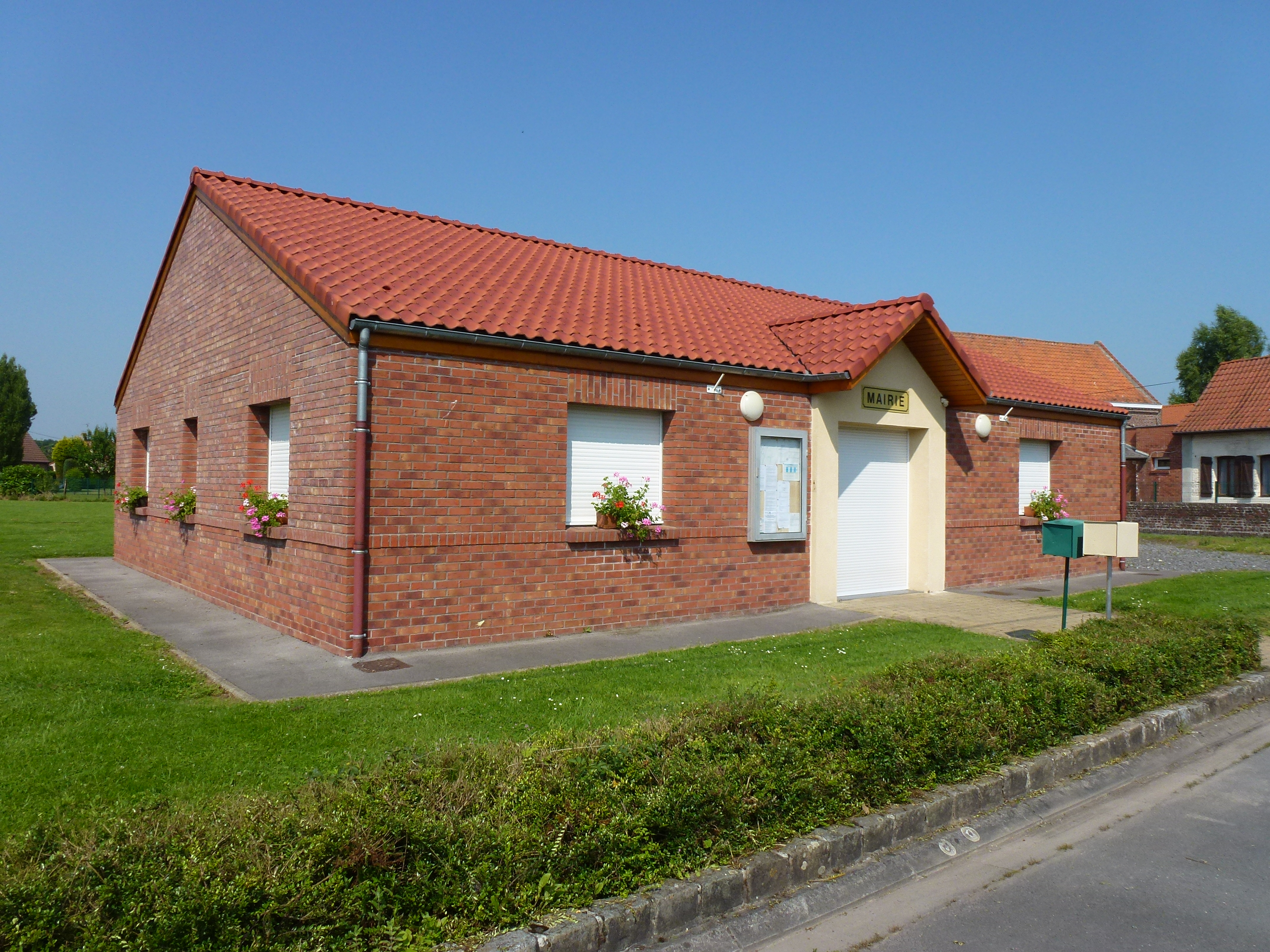
- Tilloy-lez-Marchiennes Town Hall

- Coat of arms
- Location of Tilloy-lez-Marchiennes
- Location within France Location within Hauts-de-France
- Coordinates: 50°25′43″N 3°19′10″E
- Country: France
- Region: Hauts-de-France
- Department: Nord
- Arrondissement: Douai
- Canton: Sin-le-Noble
- Intercommunality: CC Cœur d'Ostrevent

Government
  - Mayor (2025–2026): Catherine Vandewalle
- Area^{1}: 5.5 km^{2} (2.1 sq mi)
- Elevation: 18 m (59 ft)
- Highest elevation: 20 m (66 ft)
- Lowest elevation: 15 m (49 ft)
- Population (2023): 536
  - Density: 97/km^{2} (250/sq mi)
- Time zone: UTC+01:00 (CET)
  - Summer (DST): UTC+02:00 (CEST)
- INSEE/Postal code: 59596 /59870
- ^{1} French Land Register data, which excludes lakes, ponds, glaciers > 1 km^{2} (0.386 sq mi or 247 acres) and river estuaries.

Tilloy-lez-Marchiennes (French pronunciation: [tilwa le maʁʃjɛn], literally Tilloy near Marchiennes) is a commune in the Nord department in the Hauts-de-France region, Northern France. As of 2023, the population of the commune was 536.

== History ==
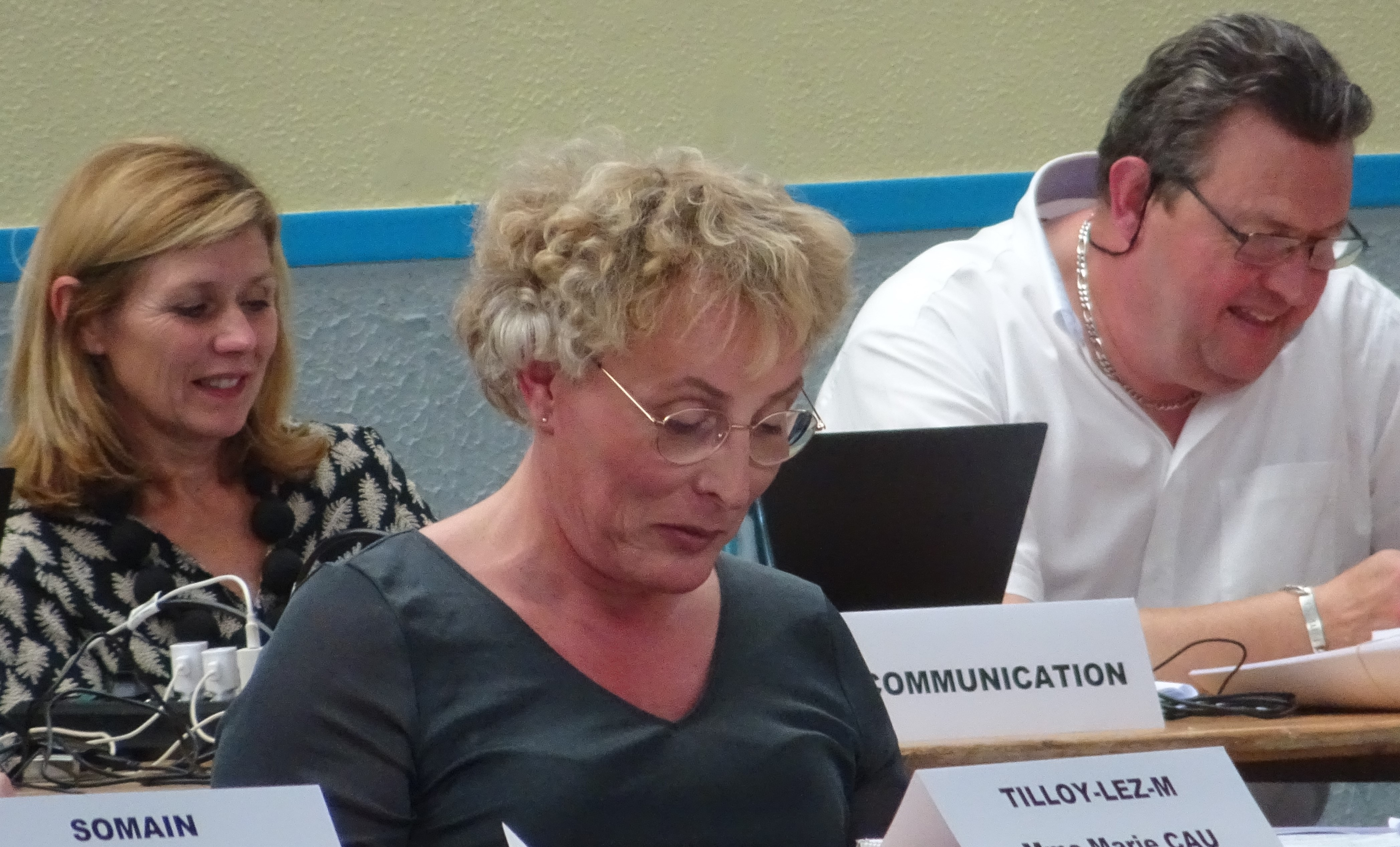
Marie Cau in 2020.

In March 2020, Marie Cau won a majority of votes in the first round of the mayoral election (with the entire municipal council also being members of her electoral list) on a platform of developing social and environmental policies like sustainable agriculture. Her inauguration was delayed until May due to the COVID-19 pandemic. Her election as the first known openly transgender mayor in France garnered international media coverage. She stepped down in January 2025, and was succeeded by Catherine Vandewalle.

== Heraldry ==
Arms of Tilloy-lez-Marchiennes	The arms of Tilloy-lez-Marchiennes are blazoned : Or, on an escarbuncle sable a ruby gules. (Abscon, Beuvry-la-Forêt, Erre, Fenain, Marchiennes, Ronchin, Tilloy-lez-Marchiennes and Wandignies-Hamage use the same arms.)

== See also ==
- Communes of the Nord department
