= Marchiennes =

- Commune
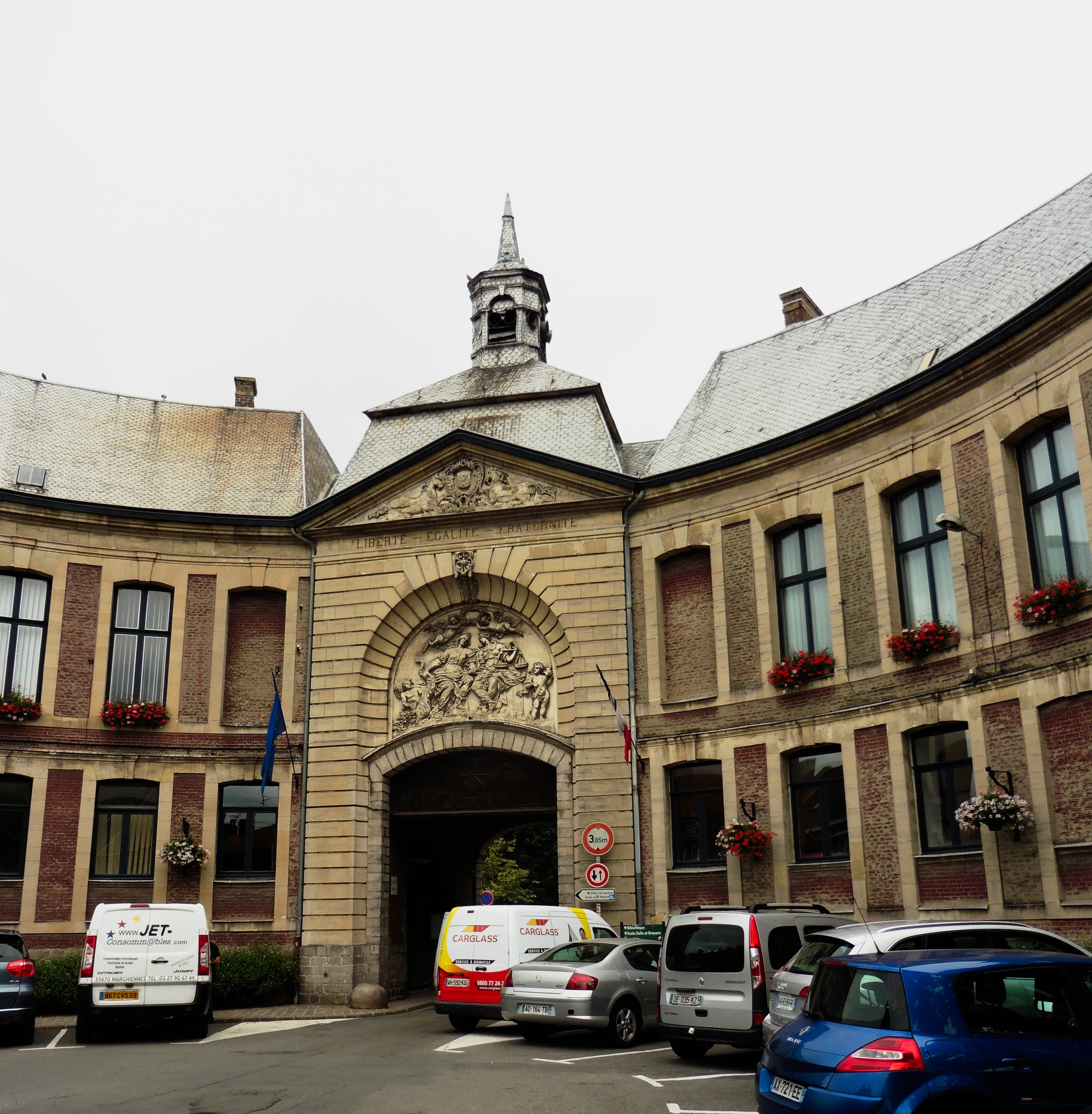
- The town hall in Marchiennes

- Coat of arms
- Location of Marchiennes
- Location within France Location within Hauts-de-France
- Coordinates: 50°24′32″N 3°16′59″E
- Country: France
- Region: Hauts-de-France
- Department: Nord
- Arrondissement: Douai
- Canton: Sin-le-Noble
- Intercommunality: Cœur d'Ostrevent

Government
  - Mayor (2024–2026): Laurent Martinez
- Area^{1}: 21.44 km^{2} (8.28 sq mi)
- Elevation: 18 m (59 ft)
- Highest elevation: 21 m (69 ft)
- Lowest elevation: 15 m (49 ft)
- Population (2023): 4,507
  - Density: 210.2/km^{2} (544.5/sq mi)
- Time zone: UTC+01:00 (CET)
  - Summer (DST): UTC+02:00 (CEST)
- INSEE/Postal code: 59375 /59870
- ^{1} French Land Register data, which excludes lakes, ponds, glaciers > 1 km^{2} (0.386 sq mi or 247 acres) and river estuaries.

Marchiennes (French pronunciation: [maʁʃjɛn]) is a commune in the Nord department in northern France. It was fictionally portrayed in Émile Zola's Germinal.

== Population ==
Historical population
Year	Pop.	±% p.a.
1968	3,375	—
1975	3,267	−0.46%
1982	3,564	+1.25%
1990	4,164	+1.96%
1999	4,641	+1.21%
2007	4,706	+0.17%
2012	4,697	−0.04%
2017	4,590	−0.46%
2023	4,507	−0.30%
Source: INSEE

== Heraldry ==
Arms of Marchiennes	The arms of Marchiennes are blazoned : Or, on an escarbuncle sable a ruby gules. (Abscon, Beuvry-la-Forêt, Erre, Fenain, Marchiennes, Ronchin, Tilloy-lez-Marchiennes and Wandignies-Hamage use the same arms.)

== See also ==
- Communes of the Nord department
- Compagnie des Canonniers de Lille
