= Lewarde =

- Commune
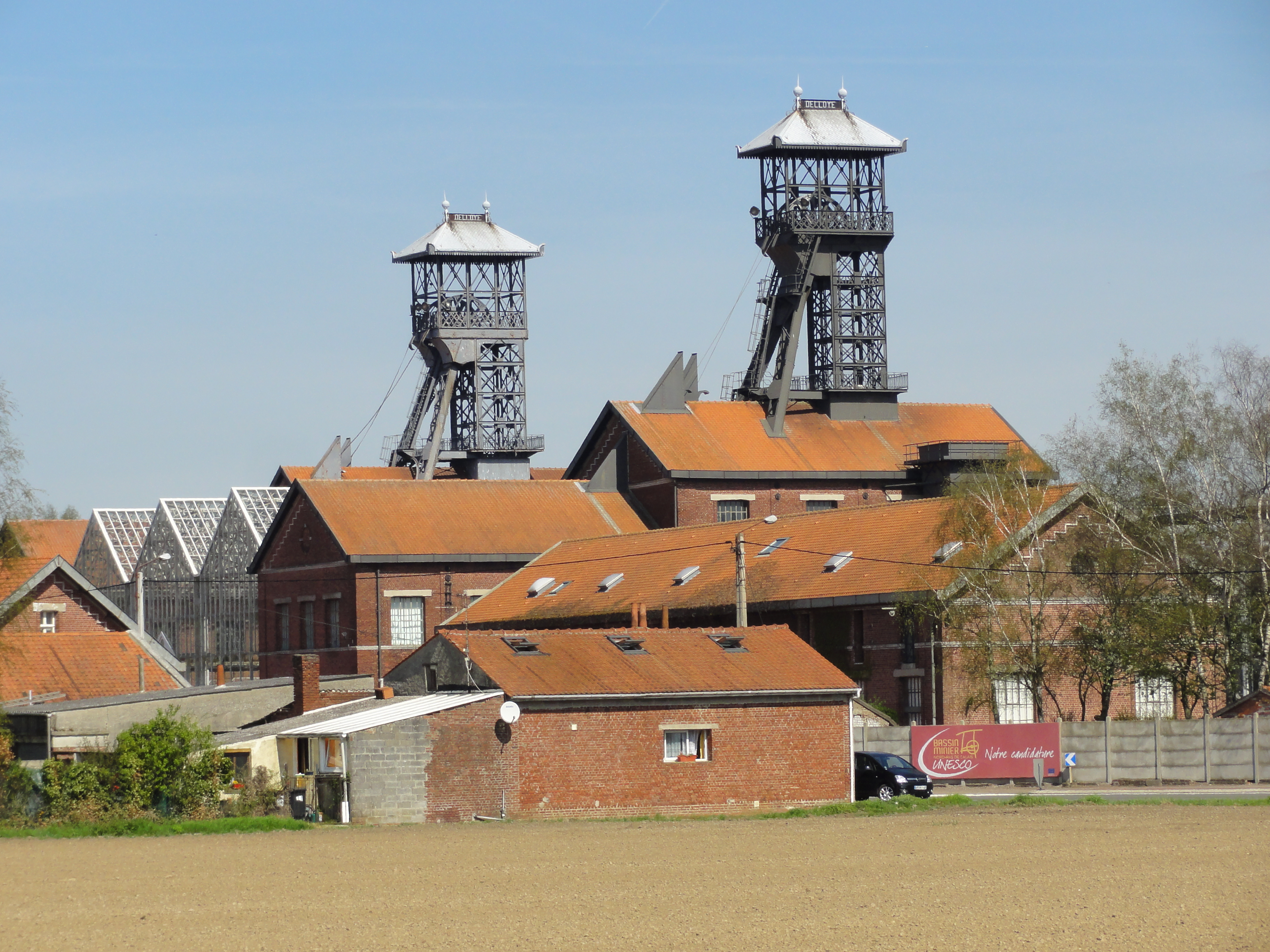
- The Delloye mine in Lewarde

- Coat of arms
- Location of Lewarde
- Location within France Location within Hauts-de-France
- Coordinates: 50°20′30″N 3°10′11″E
- Country: France
- Region: Hauts-de-France
- Department: Nord
- Arrondissement: Douai
- Canton: Aniche
- Intercommunality: Cœur d'Ostrevent

Government
  - Mayor (2022–2026): Alain Bruneel
- Area^{1}: 3.9 km^{2} (1.5 sq mi)
- Elevation: 40 m (130 ft)
- Highest elevation: 80 m (260 ft)
- Lowest elevation: 22 m (72 ft)
- Population (2023): 2,353
  - Density: 600/km^{2} (1,600/sq mi)
- Time zone: UTC+01:00 (CET)
  - Summer (DST): UTC+02:00 (CEST)
- INSEE/Postal code: 59345 /59287
- ^{1} French Land Register data, which excludes lakes, ponds, glaciers > 1 km^{2} (0.386 sq mi or 247 acres) and river estuaries.

Lewarde (French pronunciation: [ləwaʁd]; Picard: Lwarte) is a commune in the Nord department in northern France.

== Population ==
Historical population
Year	Pop.	±% p.a.
1968	1,872	—
1975	1,992	+0.89%
1982	2,289	+2.01%
1990	2,768	+2.40%
1999	2,782	+0.06%
2007	2,769	−0.06%
2012	2,645	−0.91%
2017	2,425	−1.72%
2023	2,353	−0.50%
Source: INSEE

== History ==
=== Ancient history ===
Romans medals were found at multiple times in Lewarde, as well as ballot boxes filled of ash hidden in a sandstone career and four bronze heads of a Gallo-Roman style.

=== Moyen Âge ===
The town of Lewarde has born on a wooded ridge (the mountains Saint-Rémi) surround an fortified area, built by the count of Hainaut in ~~XIII~~, where we could monitor the common border of the Counties of Flandres and the Hainaut.

Of the fortified area, nothing has stayed. But, it's at this assumed place, in the fief of Lewarde, where the town church has been built.

== Heraldry ==
Arms of Lewarde	The arms of Lewarde are blazoned : Per fess or and azure, a lion maintaining a banderole gules, and 3 martlets argent.

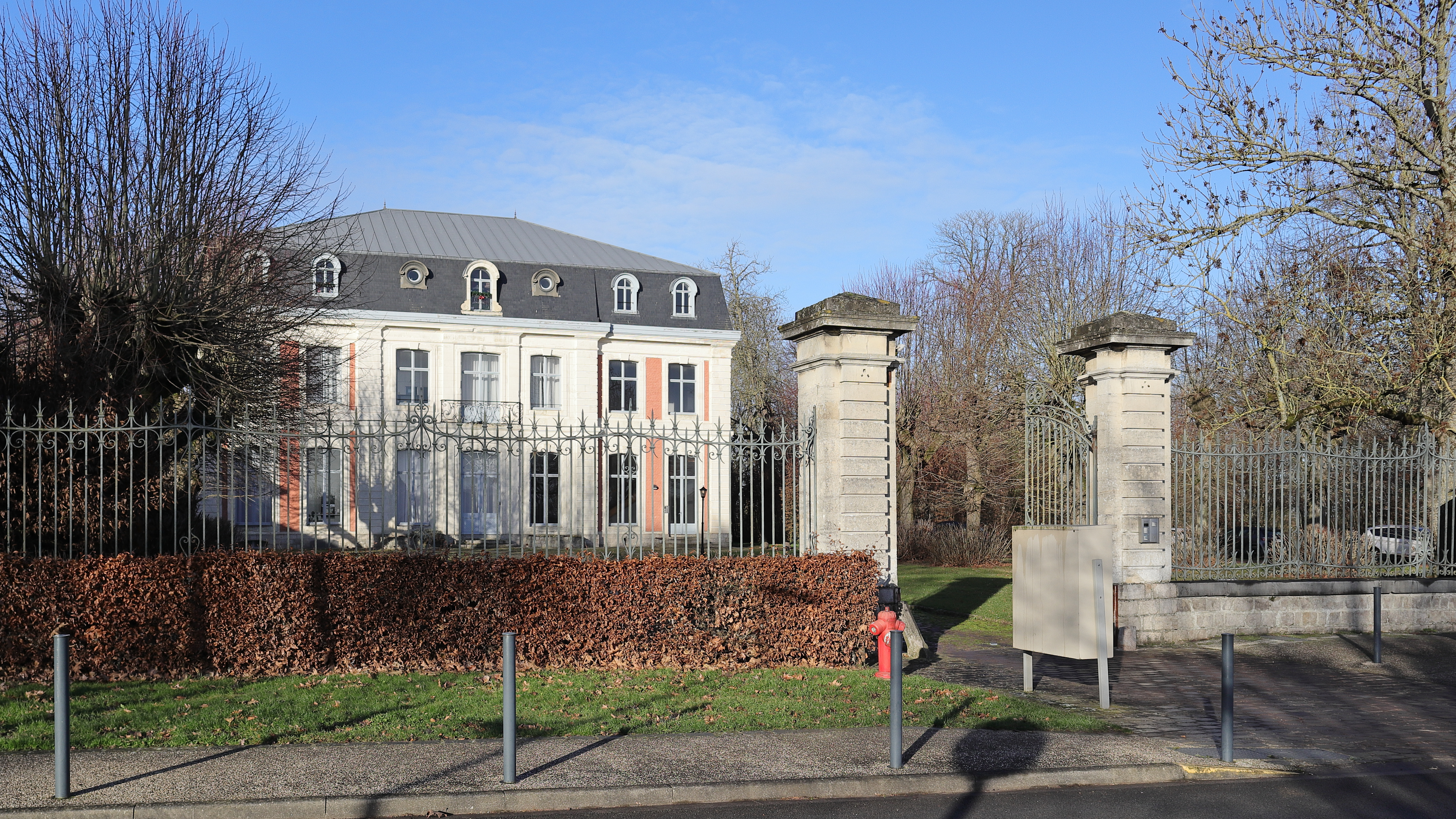
The castle

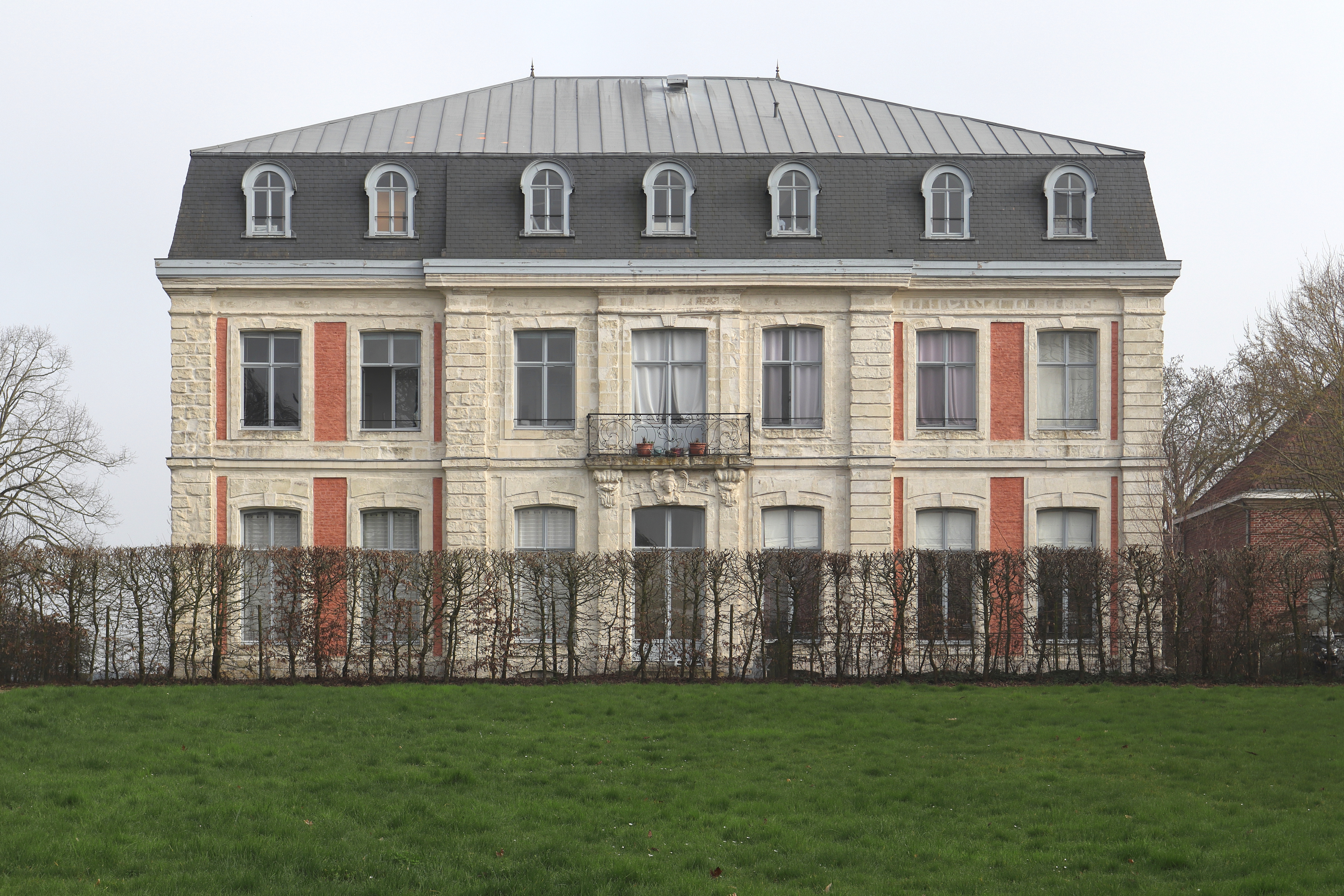
View of the park

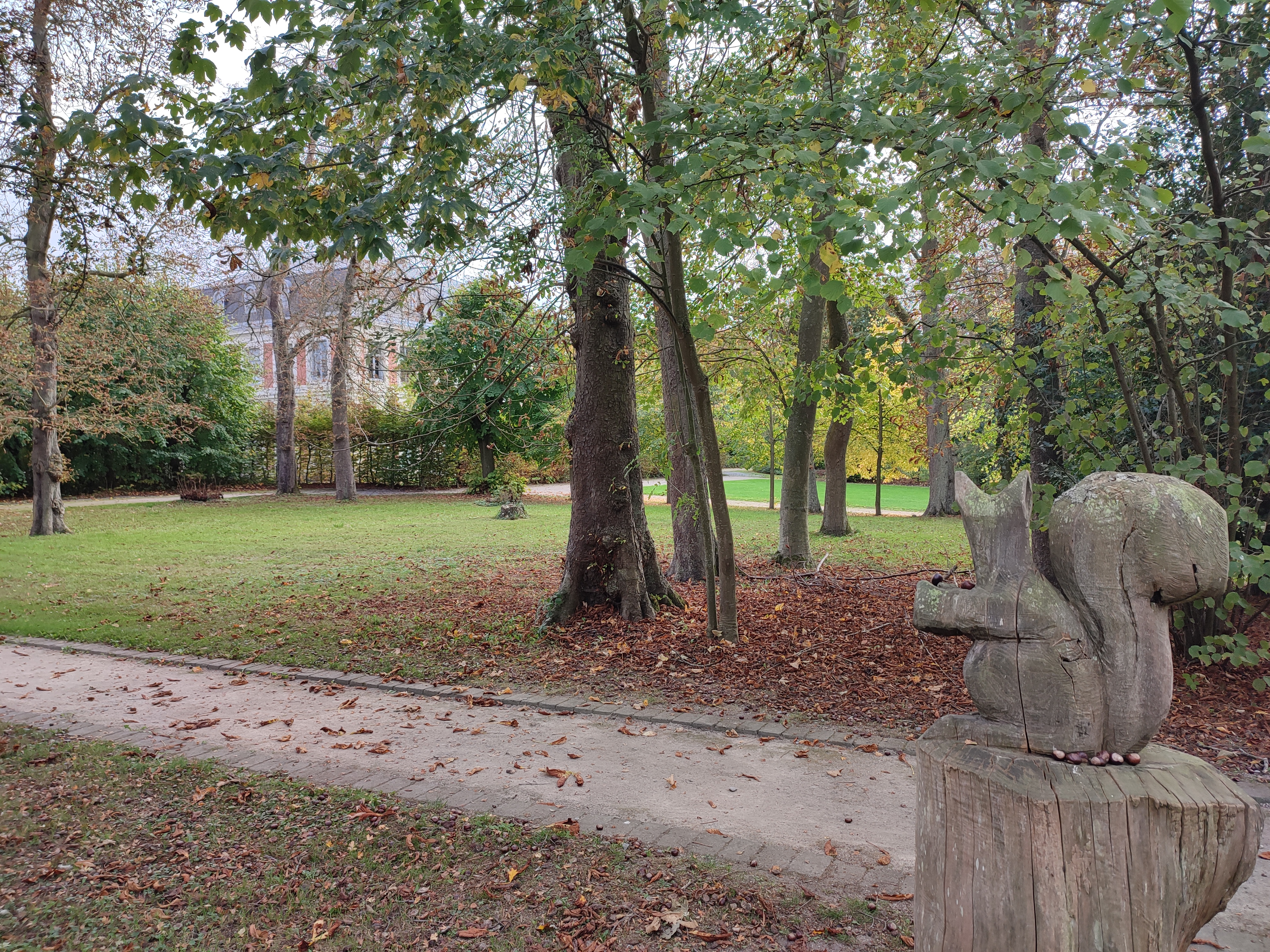
The parc

== See also ==
- Communes of the Nord department
