= Hornaing =

- Commune
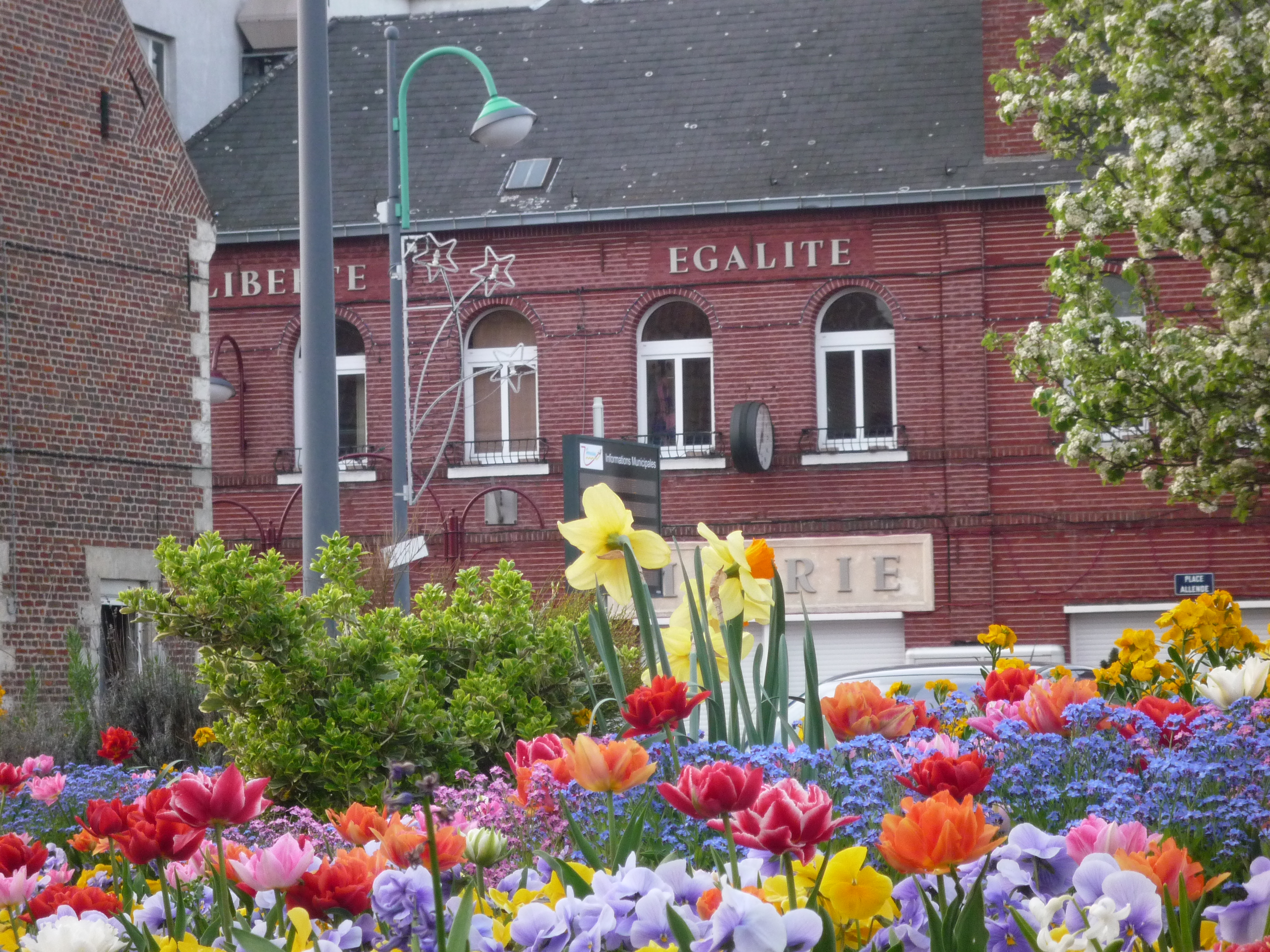
- The town hall of Hornaing

- Coat of arms
- Location of Hornaing
- Location within France Location within Hauts-de-France
- Coordinates: 50°22′07″N 3°20′10″E
- Country: France
- Region: Hauts-de-France
- Department: Nord
- Arrondissement: Douai
- Canton: Sin-le-Noble
- Intercommunality: Cœur d'Ostrevent

Government
  - Mayor (2020–2026): Frédéric Delannoy
- Area^{1}: 8.95 km^{2} (3.46 sq mi)
- Elevation: 23 m (75 ft)
- Highest elevation: 45 m (148 ft)
- Lowest elevation: 16 m (52 ft)
- Population (2023): 3,496
  - Density: 391/km^{2} (1,010/sq mi)
- Time zone: UTC+01:00 (CET)
  - Summer (DST): UTC+02:00 (CEST)
- INSEE/Postal code: 59314 /59171
- ^{1} French Land Register data, which excludes lakes, ponds, glaciers > 1 km^{2} (0.386 sq mi or 247 acres) and river estuaries.

Hornaing (French pronunciation: [ɔʁnɛ̃]) is a commune in the Nord department, northern France.

== Population ==
Historical population
Year	Pop.	±% p.a.
1968	3,178	—
1975	3,102	−0.35%
1982	2,971	−0.61%
1990	2,931	−0.17%
1999	2,942	+0.04%
2007	3,199	+1.05%
2012	3,571	+2.22%
2017	3,553	−0.10%
2023	3,496	−0.27%
Source: INSEE

== Heraldry ==
Arms of Hornaing	The arms of Hornaing are blazoned : Gules, a fess and in chief a vivre Or. [a vivre is a thin barrulet dancetty] (Hornaing and Mastaing use the same arms.)

== See also ==
- Communes of the Nord department
