= Communauté de communes Cœur d'Ostrevent =

Federation of municipalities in Hauts-de-France, France

Cœur d'Ostrevent
- Communauté de communes
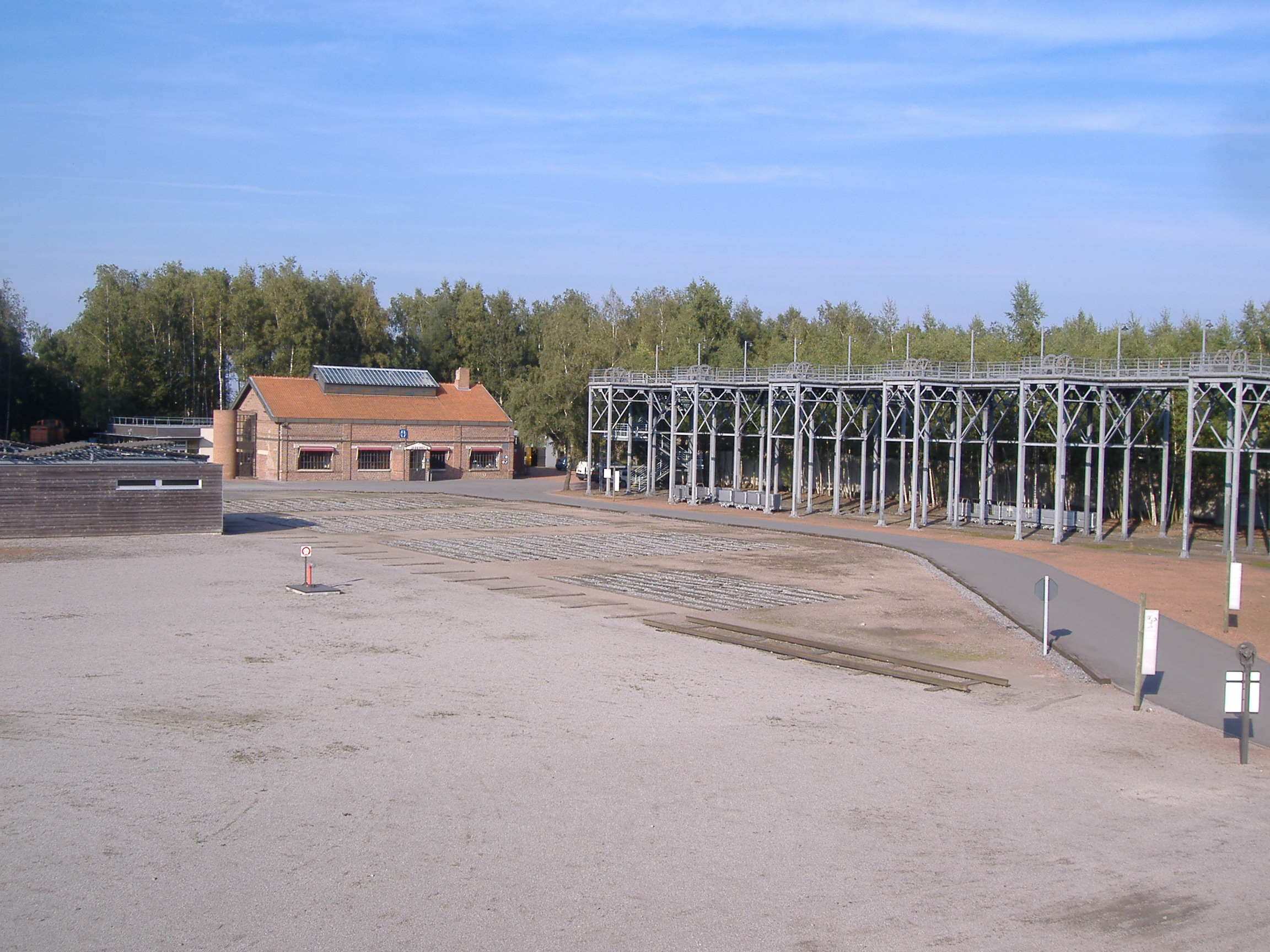
- Former sawmill of Lewarde
- Interactive map of Cœur d'Ostrevent
- Coordinates: 50°21′05″N 3°16′13″E
- Country: France
- Region: Hauts-de-France
- Department: Nord
- No. of communes: {{{nbcomm}}}
- Established: December 2000

Government
  - President: Jean-Jacques Candelier
- Area: 138.2 km^{2} (53.4 sq mi)
- Population (2021): 70,431
  - Density: 509.6/km^{2} (1,320/sq mi)
- Website: www.cc-coeurdostrevent.fr

The Communauté de communes Cœur d'Ostrevent is a federation of municipalities (communauté de communes) in the Nord département and in the Nord-Pas-de-Calais région of France. Its seat is Lewarde. The commune Émerchicourt left the communauté de communes and joined the communauté d'agglomération de la Porte du Hainaut in January 2019. Its area is 138.2 km^{2}, and its population was 70,431 in 2021.

== Composition ==
The communauté de communes consists of the following 20 communes:

1. Aniche
2. Auberchicourt
3. Bruille-lez-Marchiennes
4. Écaillon
5. Erre
6. Fenain
7. Hornaing
8. Lewarde
9. Loffre
10. Marchiennes
11. Masny
12. Monchecourt
13. Montigny-en-Ostrevent
14. Pecquencourt
15. Rieulay
16. Somain
17. Tilloy-lez-Marchiennes
18. Vred
19. Wandignies-Hamage
20. Warlaing

== See also ==
- Communes of the Nord department
