= Écaillon =

- Commune
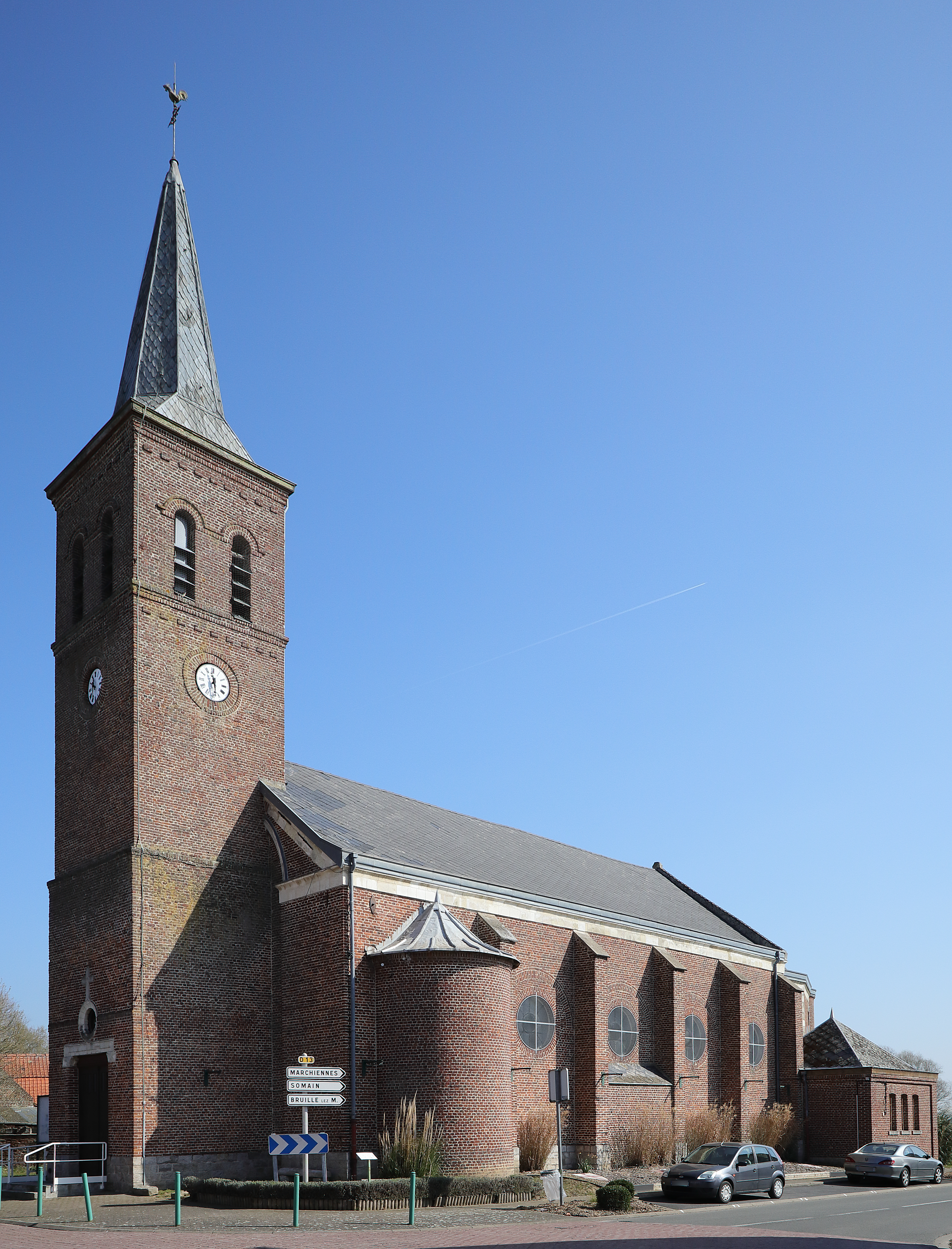
- The church

- Coat of arms
- Location of Écaillon
- Location within France Location within Hauts-de-France
- Coordinates: 50°21′05″N 3°13′01″E
- Country: France
- Region: Hauts-de-France
- Department: Nord
- Arrondissement: Douai
- Canton: Aniche
- Intercommunality: Cœur d'Ostrevent

Government
  - Mayor (2020–2026): Georges Cino
- Area^{1}: 4 km^{2} (1.5 sq mi)
- Elevation: 25 m (82 ft)
- Highest elevation: 35 m (115 ft)
- Lowest elevation: 19 m (62 ft)
- Population (2023): 1,869
  - Density: 470/km^{2} (1,200/sq mi)
- Time zone: UTC+01:00 (CET)
  - Summer (DST): UTC+02:00 (CEST)
- INSEE/Postal code: 59185 /59176
- ^{1} French Land Register data, which excludes lakes, ponds, glaciers > 1 km^{2} (0.386 sq mi or 247 acres) and river estuaries.

Écaillon (French pronunciation: [ekajɔ̃]) is a commune in the Nord department in northern France.

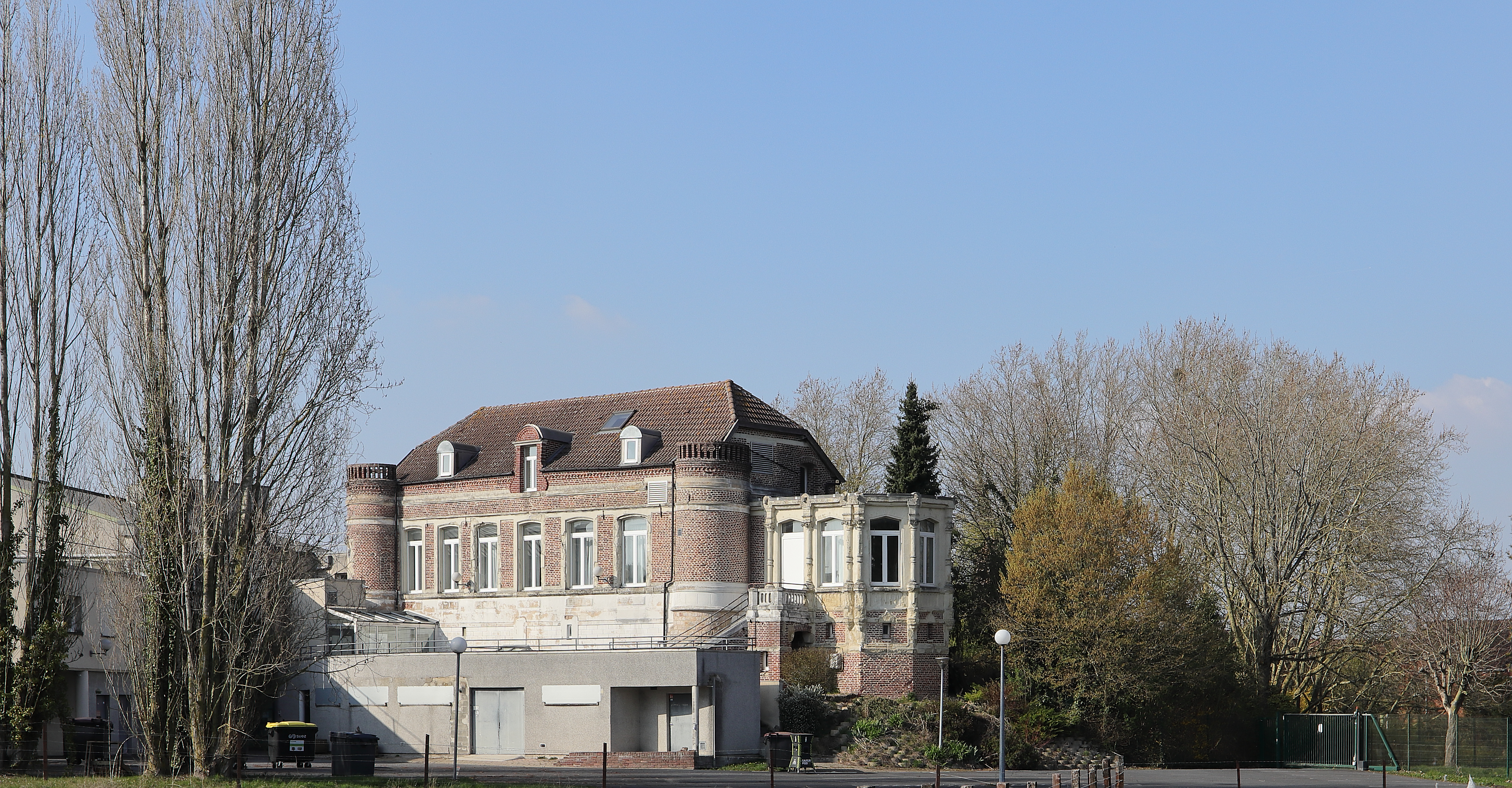
The Le Chateau Nursing Home

== Heraldry ==
Arms of Écaillon	The arms of Écaillon are blazoned : Argent, a cross engrailed gules. (Bruille-lez-Marchiennes and Écaillon use the same arms.)

== See also ==
- Communes of the Nord department
