= Canton of Sin-le-Noble =

Coordinates: 50.36°N 3.11°E

The canton of Sin-le-Noble is an administrative division of the Nord department, northern France. It was created at the French canton reorganisation which came into effect in March 2015. Its seat is in Sin-le-Noble.

It consists of the following communes:

1. Bruille-lez-Marchiennes
2. Erre
3. Fenain
4. Hornaing
5. Lallaing
6. Marchiennes
7. Pecquencourt
8. Rieulay
9. Sin-le-Noble
10. Somain
11. Tilloy-lez-Marchiennes
12. Vred
13. Wandignies-Hamage
14. Warlaing
15. Waziers
