= Waziers =

- Commune
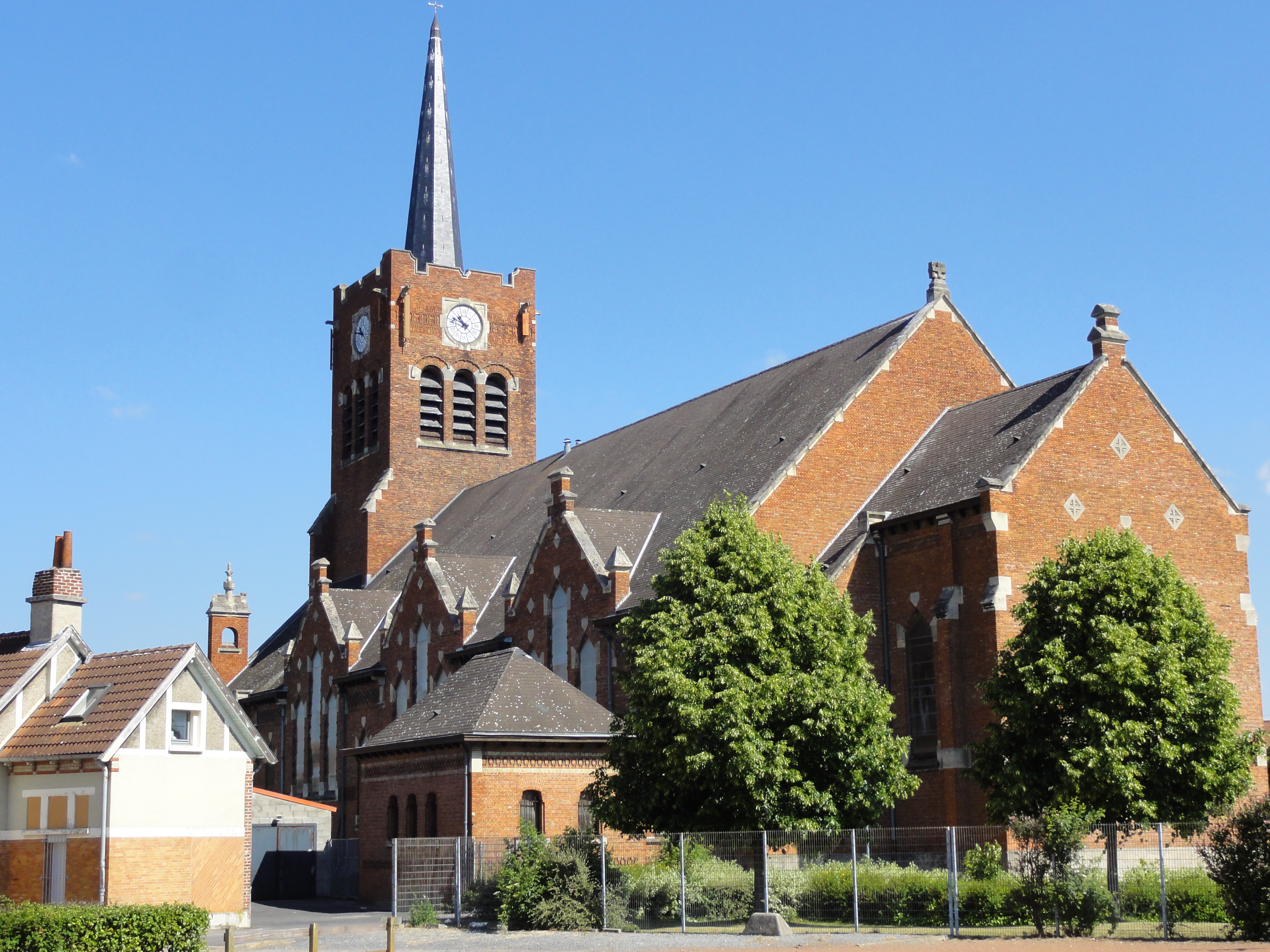
- The church in Waziers

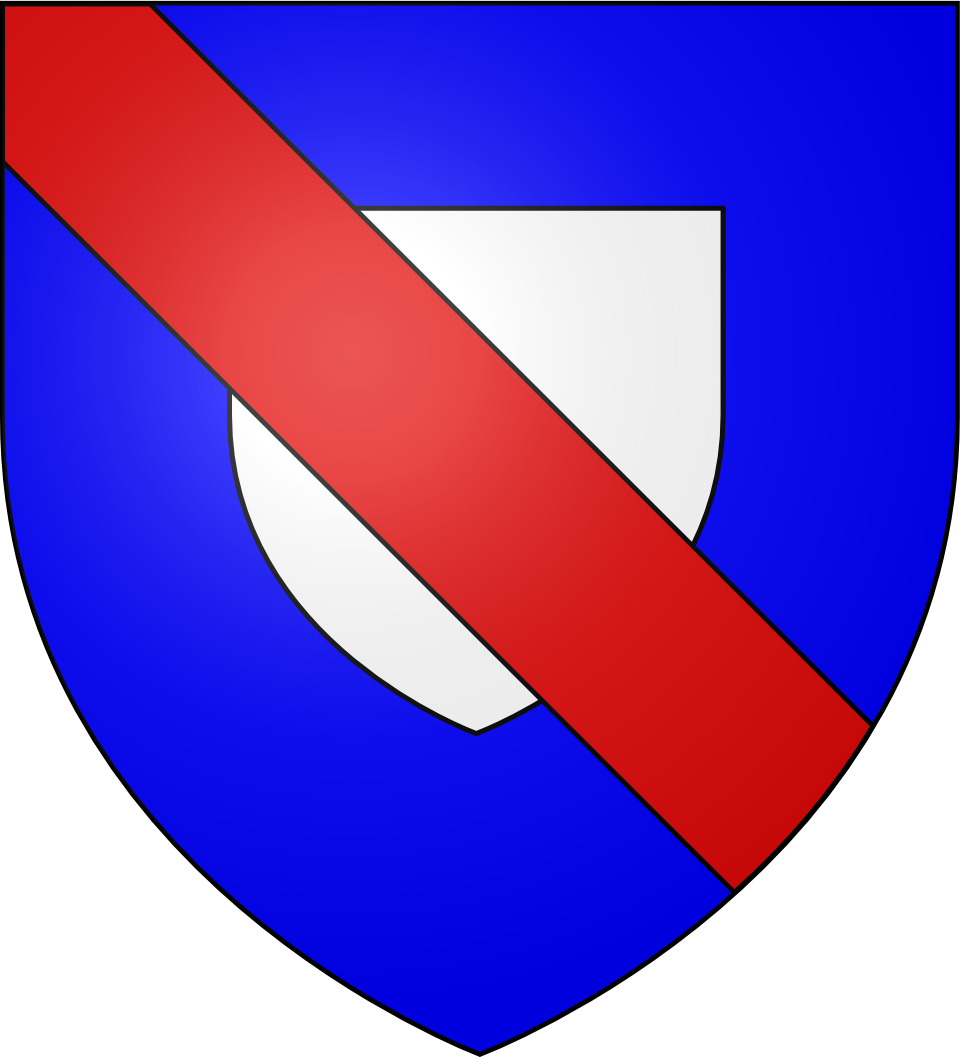
- Coat of arms
- Location of Waziers
- Location within France Location within Hauts-de-France
- Coordinates: 50°23′13″N 3°06′47″E
- Country: France
- Region: Hauts-de-France
- Department: Nord
- Arrondissement: Douai
- Canton: Sin-le-Noble
- Intercommunality: Douaisis Agglo

Government
  - Mayor (2020–2026): Laurent Desmons
- Area^{1}: 4.34 km^{2} (1.68 sq mi)
- Elevation: 27 m (89 ft)
- Highest elevation: 27 m (89 ft)
- Lowest elevation: 17 m (56 ft)
- Population (2023): 7,266
  - Density: 1,670/km^{2} (4,340/sq mi)
- Time zone: UTC+01:00 (CET)
  - Summer (DST): UTC+02:00 (CEST)
- INSEE/Postal code: 59654 /59119
- ^{1} French Land Register data, which excludes lakes, ponds, glaciers > 1 km^{2} (0.386 sq mi or 247 acres) and river estuaries.

Waziers (French pronunciation: [wazje]) is a commune in the Nord department in northern France.

It is 4 km (2.5 mi) northeast of Douai and 25 km (16 mi) south of Lille.

== Heraldry ==
Arms of Waziers	The arms of Waziers are blazoned : Azure, a inescutcheon argent, overall a bend gules.

== Population ==
Historical population
Year	Pop.	±% p.a.
1968	11,149	—
1975	10,251	−1.19%
1982	9,267	−1.43%
1990	8,824	−0.61%
1999	7,910	−1.21%
2007	7,686	−0.36%
2012	7,639	−0.12%
2017	7,452	−0.49%
2023	7,266	−0.42%
Source: INSEE

== See also ==
- Communes of the Nord department
