= Lezennes =

- Commune
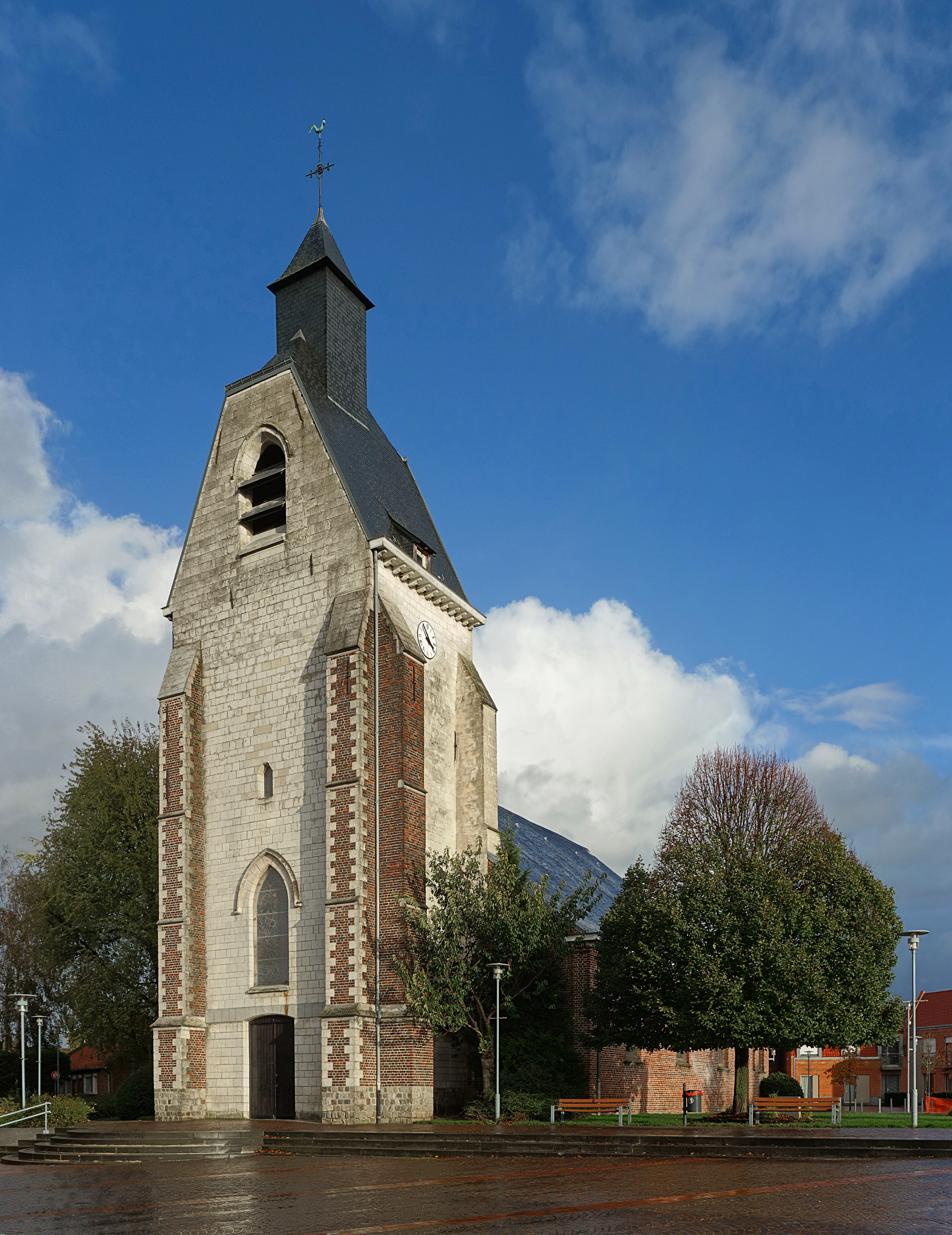
- The church in Lezennes

- Coat of arms
- Location of Lezennes
- Location within France Location within Hauts-de-France
- Coordinates: 50°37′01″N 3°07′01″E
- Country: France
- Region: Hauts-de-France
- Department: Nord
- Arrondissement: Lille
- Canton: Lille-4
- Intercommunality: Métropole Européenne de Lille

Government
  - Mayor (2020–2026): Didier Dufour
- Area^{1}: 2.14 km^{2} (0.83 sq mi)
- Elevation: 41 m (135 ft)
- Population (2023): 2,978
  - Density: 1,390/km^{2} (3,600/sq mi)
- Time zone: UTC+01:00 (CET)
  - Summer (DST): UTC+02:00 (CEST)
- INSEE/Postal code: 59346 /59260
- ^{1} French Land Register data, which excludes lakes, ponds, glaciers > 1 km^{2} (0.386 sq mi or 247 acres) and river estuaries.

Lezennes (French pronunciation: [ləzɛn]) is a commune in the Nord department in northern France.

== Population ==
Historical population
Year	Pop.	±% p.a.
1968	2,690	—
1975	2,589	−0.55%
1982	2,762	+0.93%
1990	3,317	+2.32%
1999	3,350	+0.11%
2007	3,089	−1.01%
2012	3,135	+0.30%
2017	3,104	−0.20%
2023	2,978	−0.69%
Source: INSEE

== Heraldry ==
Arms of Lezennes	The arms of Lezennes are blazoned : Or, 3 fleurs de lys azure, a canton bendy argent and gules.

== See also ==
- Communes of the Nord department
