= Ruda Różaniecka =

- Village
- Location within Poland
- Coordinates: 50°19′N 23°11′E
- Country: Poland
- Voivodeship: Subcarpathian
- County: Lubaczów
- Gmina: Narol
- Population: 1,200

Ruda Różaniecka [ˈruda ruʐaˈɲɛt͡ska] is a village in the administrative district of Gmina Narol, within Lubaczów County, Subcarpathian Voivodeship, in south-eastern Poland.
