= Montigny-en-Ostrevent =

- Commune
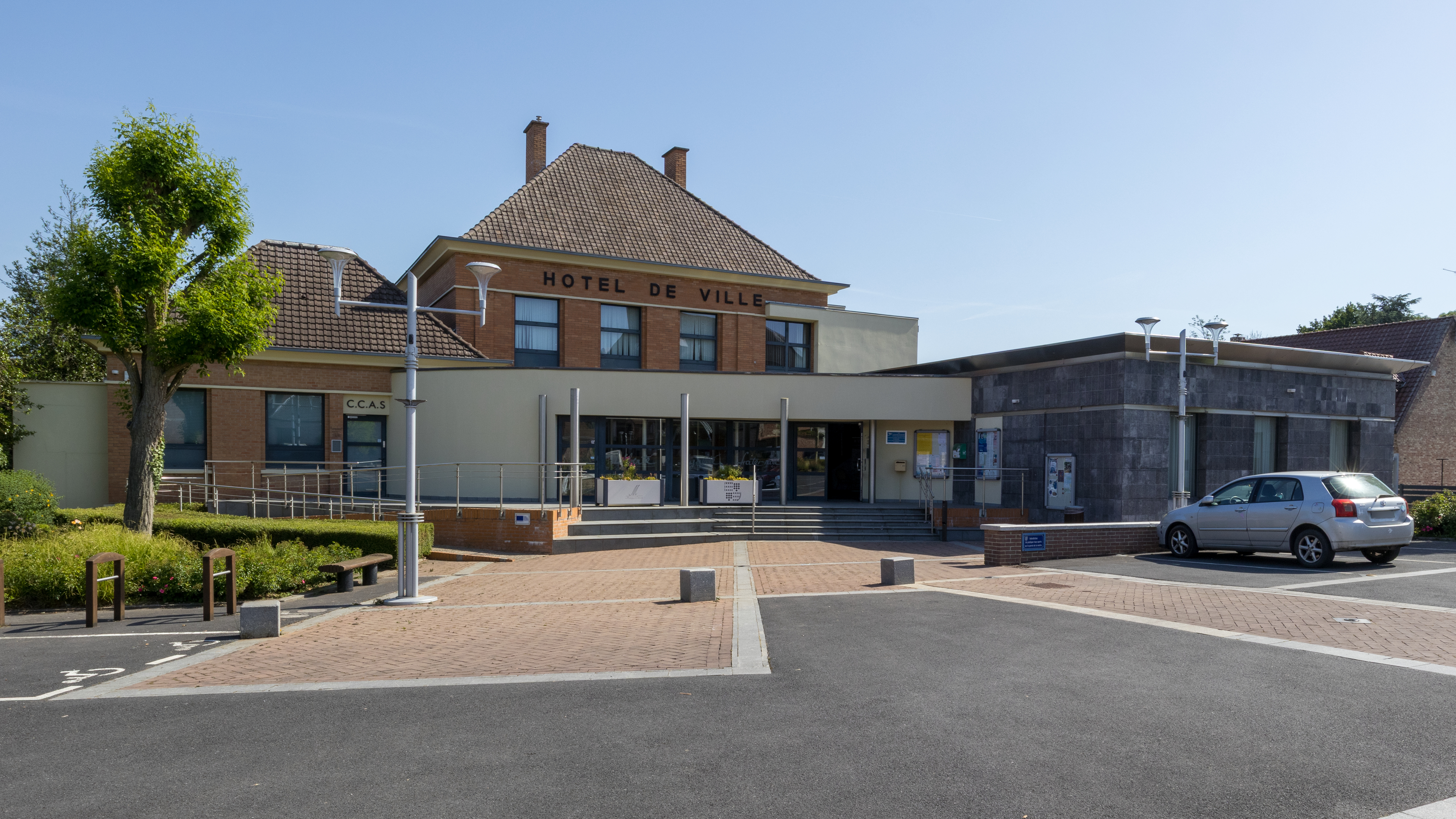
- The town hall in Montigny-en-Ostrevent

- Coat of arms
- Location of Montigny-en-Ostrevent
- Location within France Location within Hauts-de-France
- Coordinates: 50°22′03″N 3°11′16″E
- Country: France
- Region: Hauts-de-France
- Department: Nord
- Arrondissement: Douai
- Canton: Aniche
- Intercommunality: CC Cœur d'Ostrevent

Government
  - Mayor (2020–2026): Salvatore De Cesare
- Area^{1}: 5.42 km^{2} (2.09 sq mi)
- Highest elevation: 40 m (130 ft)
- Lowest elevation: 18 m (59 ft)
- Population (2023): 4,495
  - Density: 829/km^{2} (2,150/sq mi)
- Time zone: UTC+01:00 (CET)
  - Summer (DST): UTC+02:00 (CEST)
- INSEE/Postal code: 59414 /59182
- ^{1} French Land Register data, which excludes lakes, ponds, glaciers > 1 km^{2} (0.386 sq mi or 247 acres) and river estuaries.

Montigny-en-Ostrevent is a commune in the Nord department in northern France.

== Population ==
Historical population
Year	Pop.	±% p.a.
1968	5,756	—
1975	5,660	−0.24%
1982	5,489	−0.44%
1990	5,452	−0.08%
1999	4,850	−1.29%
2007	4,785	−0.17%
2012	4,810	+0.10%
2017	4,801	−0.04%
2023	4,495	−1.09%
Source: INSEE

== Heraldry ==
Arms of Montigny-en-Ostrevent	The arms of Montigny-en-Ostrevent are blazoned : Quarterly 1&4: barry gules and vair; 2&3: Gules, 10 lozenges conjoined argent 3,3,3,1.

== See also ==
- Communes of the Nord department
