= Erre =

- Commune
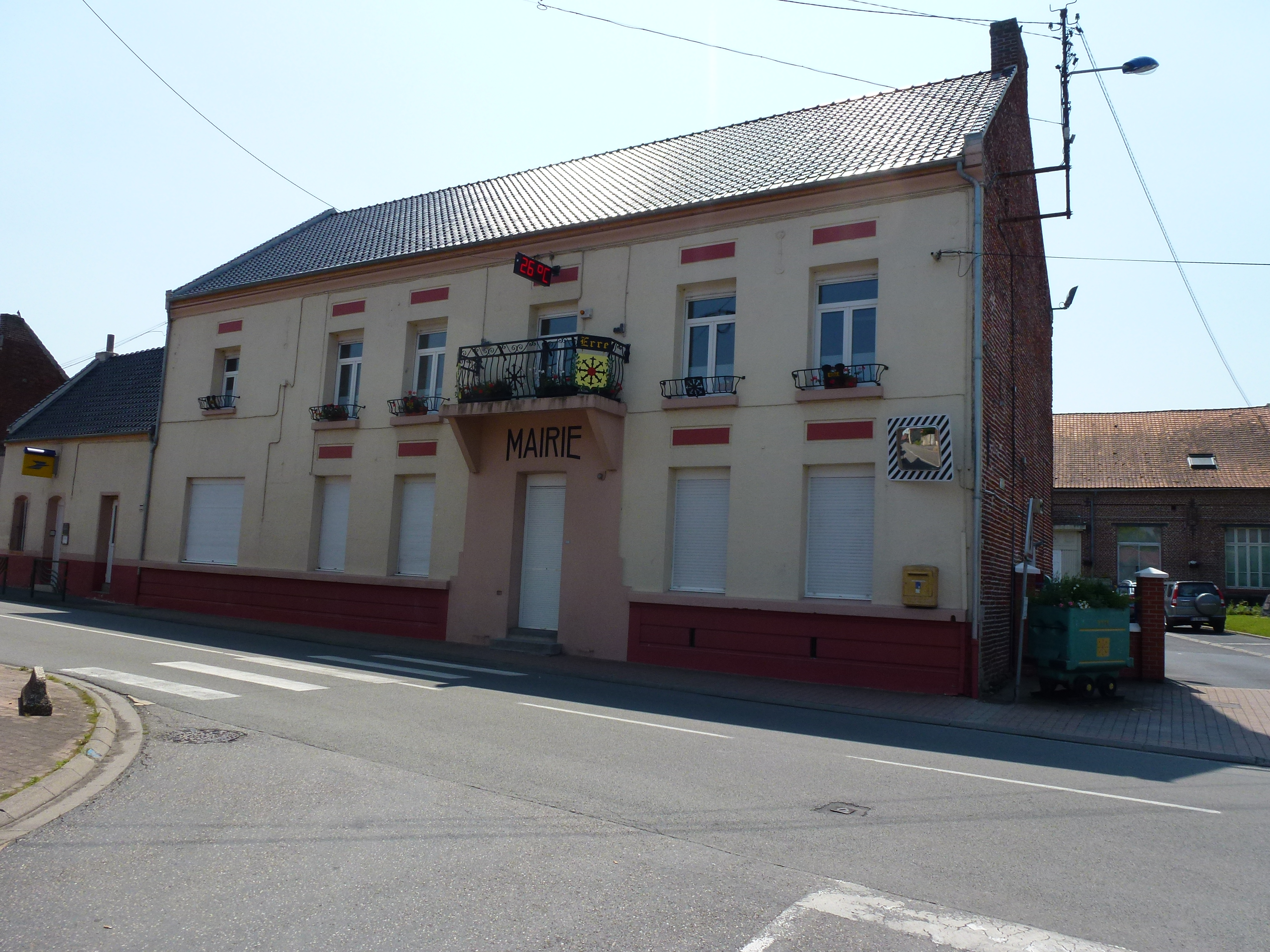
- The town hall in Erre

- Coat of arms
- Location of Erre
- Location within France Location within Hauts-de-France
- Coordinates: 50°21′47″N 3°18′56″E
- Country: France
- Region: Hauts-de-France
- Department: Nord
- Arrondissement: Douai
- Canton: Sin-le-Noble
- Intercommunality: Cœur d'Ostrevent

Government
  - Mayor (2021–2026): Jean-François Daly
- Area^{1}: 5.88 km^{2} (2.27 sq mi)
- Elevation: 23 m (75 ft)
- Highest elevation: 49 m (161 ft)
- Lowest elevation: 16 m (52 ft)
- Population (2023): 1,586
  - Density: 270/km^{2} (699/sq mi)
- Time zone: UTC+01:00 (CET)
  - Summer (DST): UTC+02:00 (CEST)
- INSEE/Postal code: 59203 /59171
- ^{1} French Land Register data, which excludes lakes, ponds, glaciers > 1 km^{2} (0.386 sq mi or 247 acres) and river estuaries.

Erre (French pronunciation: [ɛʁ]) is a commune in the Nord department in northern France.

It is 15 km (9.3 mi) east of Douai.
