= Siege of Douai (1710) =

First siege of Douai during the War of the Spanish Succession

Coordinates: 50°22′15″N 3°04′45″E

- Part of the War of the Spanish Succession
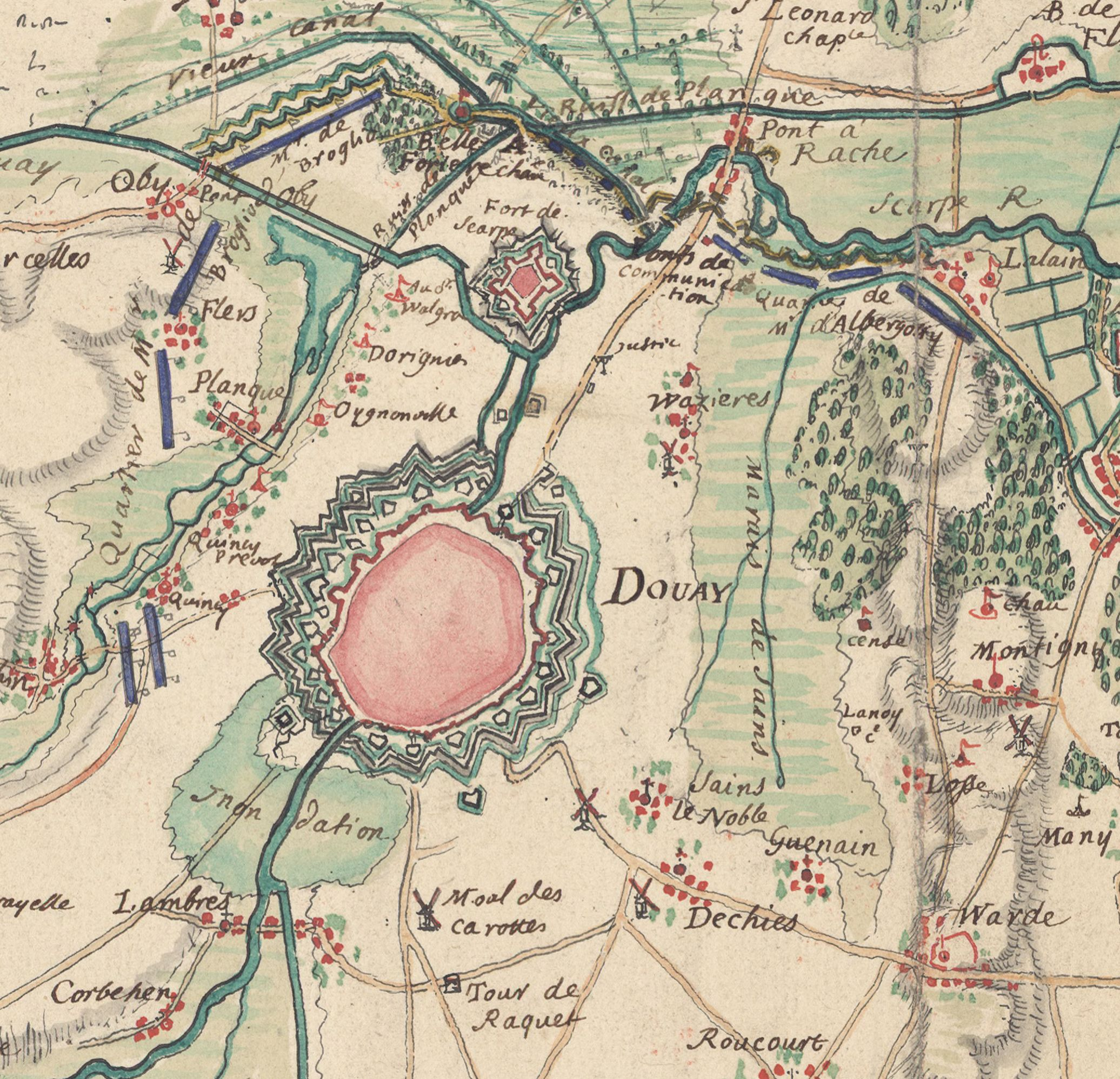
- 1710 plan of the siege
Date	22 April – 25 June 1710
Location	Douai
Result	Grand Alliance victory

Belligerents
Dutch Republic; Great Britain; Habsburg monarchy	France

Commanders and leaders
(Dutch Republic) Prince of Orange; (Habsburg monarchy) Leopold I, Prince of Anhalt-Dessau	François Albergotti

Strength
27,000	7,500–8,000

Casualties and losses
8,000	3,000

The siege of Douai, which lasted from 22 April 1710 until the capitulation of the garrison under lieutenant-general François Zénobe Philippe Albergotti on 25 June 1710 was part of the Allied campaign of 1710 in the War of the Spanish Succession. The siege was conducted under the joint command of the Princ of Orange and Leopold I, Prince of Anhalt-Dessau and successfully concluded despite the fact that halfway through the French army under marshal Claude Louis Hector de Villars, 1st Duke of Villars made an attempt to relieve the fortress city, which led to an indecisive stand-off for four days with the Allied Army under John Churchill, 1st Duke of Marlborough and Prince Eugene of Savoy. After Douai the Allies went on to besiege Béthune.

== Background ==
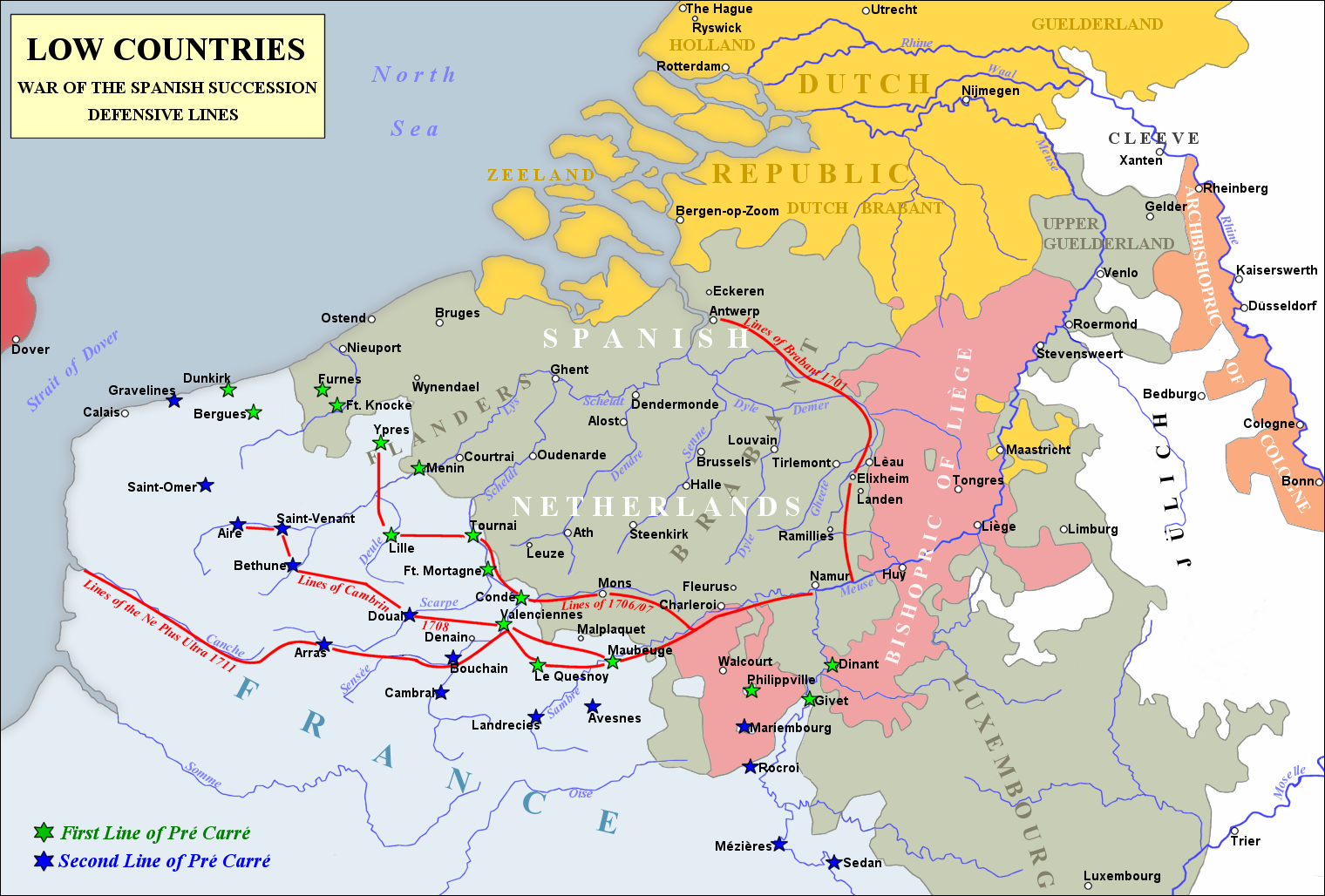
The frontière de fer or pré carré as it was envisioned by Vauban

At the start of the new campaign season of 1710 of the War of the Spanish Succession the Allies hoped to be able to break through the double line of fortresses (the frontière de fer or iron border) that had protected northern France since 1708 to be able to finally march on Paris. Like in 1709 the allied forces were divided into two armies, one Anglo-Dutch force of 106 battalions and 169 squadrons under command of the Duke of Marlborough (with Claude Frédéric t'Serclaes, Count of Tilly as his Dutch second-in-command) and an Imperialist force of 64 battalions and 109 squadrons under Prince Eugene. On the advice of Quartermaster General Daniël van Dopff Marlborough decided to start the campaign with the siege of the strong fortress of Douai, with its important arsenal and gunpowder mills. Afterwards they hoped to go on to Arras or Cambrai, and if this was also successful the road to Paris would be open. Initially it proved difficult to control the (for the time) enormous mass of soldiers of 165,000 men and to prevent looting and disturbing the populace. So the commanders promulgated severe punishments for soldiers who contravened the articles of war on 23 April 1710 (incidentally, the day the siege of Douai was opened), and this proved successful. The supply of the army was an enormous undertaking: each day 1500 carts with the bread for the troops had to depart from the bakeries in Lille and Tournai (both in Allied hands at this time).

== The siege ==
=== Preliminaries ===
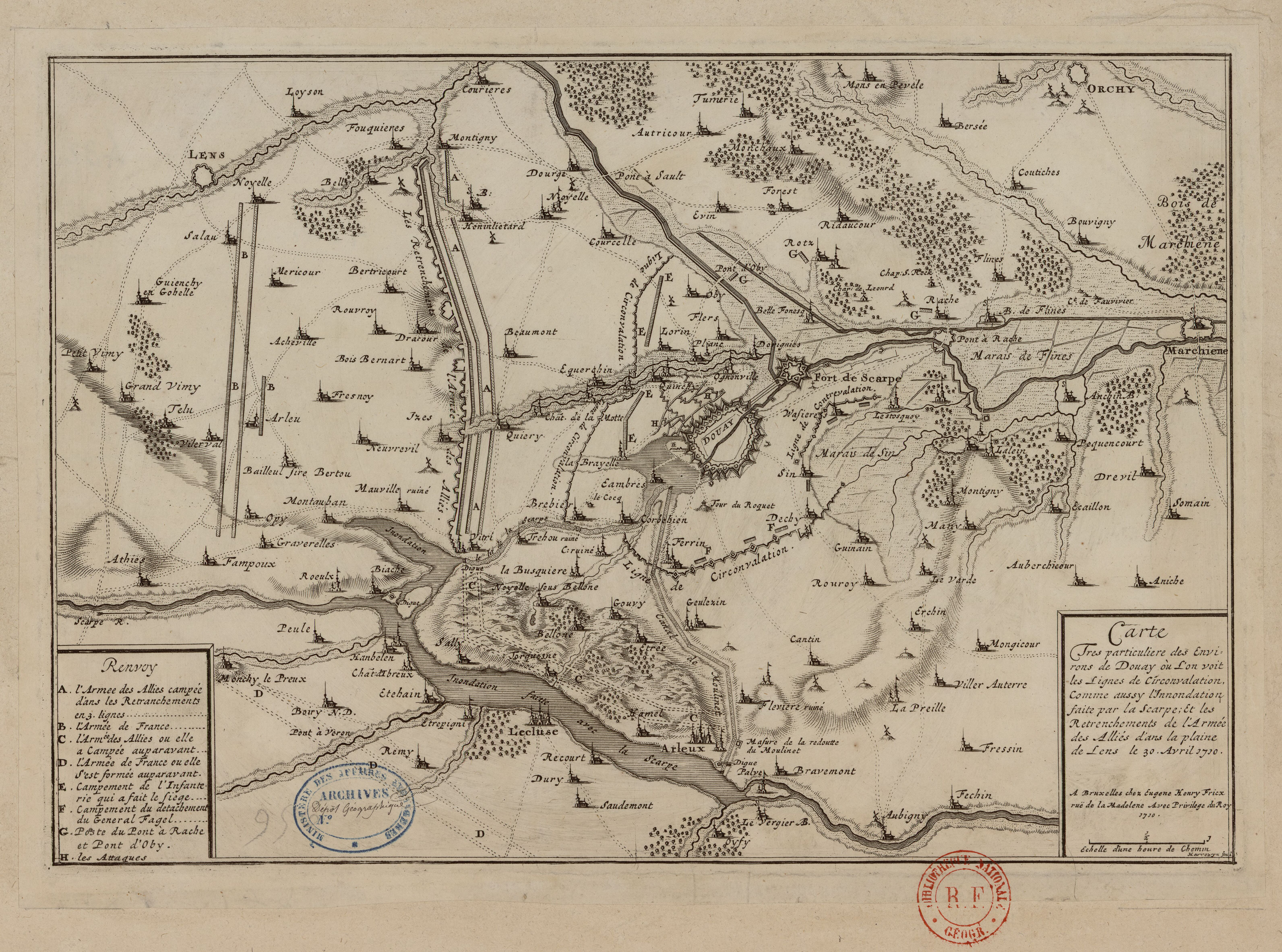
Map of the fortress and siege works by Eugène Henri Fricx (Note: North on this map is to the right; West to the top of the page. The trenches are marked H on the map southwest of the fortress. The circumvallation lines are clearly marked. The Fieldworks of the Allied army are to the left of the city marked A. The disposition of the French army is marked B.)

The situation on the ground in Douai was as follows: the fortress was situated on the banks of the river Scarpe and the terrain was marshy, also because the French had inundated the countryside. The garrison of the fortress consisted of about 8000 men (Note: Seventeen battalions of infantry, a company of gunners, a brigade of miners and bombardiers, and two regiments of dragoons.) under Albergotti. North of the actual fortress there was a second, smaller fortress called the Scarpe fortress, at a distance of"a cannon shot" (a few hundred meters). This had a garrison of three battalions and six companies of "invalids". The defenses of the city included a system of mines, which would make it necessary to go underground for the besiegers too. The Allied main force surrounded the city in a wide semi-circle anchored on the Scarpe between Vitry and the canal to Lille, to the other side of the city at the bridge of Râches over the Scarpe. The besieging force under the technical direction of engineer general Guillaume le Vasseur des Rocques and the tactical command of the Prince of Orange (Note: John William Friso as he styled himself, though the title was contested by his cousin Frederick I of Prussia. Cf. Second Stadtholderless Period.) and Anhalt consisted of 40 battalions and 32 squadrons, 70 siege guns and 80 mortars. They were complemented by 6000 laborers to dig the trenches and construct the circumvallation. After the circumvallation (Note: See Quincy for a detailed description of the circumvallation works.) had been completed on 5 May 1710 the trenches were started on the West side of the city, to attack two objectives: the Esquerchin gate on the right (under the Prince of Anhalt), and the Okre gate (under the Prince of Orange) on the left. The garrison discovered this too late to prevent it, so they performed a sortie on 7 May with 1200 men under the Duc de Montemart from the Okre gate that scattered the workforce and killed many men from the covering battalion. They succeeded in partially destroying the parallel trenches near that gate, before they were driven back by the troops of brigadier Macartney who pursued them to the counterscarp. The next day the prince of Anhalt brought up eight kartouwen against a redoubt on the southwest side of the city that had been firing on the neighboring trenches making many casualties under the laborers. After 11 May several batteries started to batter this part of the defensive works, taking it out of commission.

This type of skirmish became routine in the following weeks. The siege progressed steadily, but slowly, in this way, because of the spirited defense the garrison put up. (Note: See Quincy for a detailed description of the entrenching operations from day to day. He highlights an occasion in the night of 10/11 May when a bomb fired by the defenders on a part of a new trench hit a powder magazine, and the ensuing explosion killed 150 besiegers. An other highlight he describes is 25 May, when the Prince of Anhalt was lightly wounded in the face while passing through a sap dug by the besiegers.) Marlborough and Prince Eugene visited the siegeworks on a daily basis to inform themselves of the progress, but they could not hurry along the pace of events. Time was of the essence, because Villars was of course not sitting still and it was expected that he would arrive any moment to relieve the city with his army.

=== The Standoff ===
Villars had been handicapped by the fact that, unlike the Allies, the French forces had been slow in preparing for the new campaign season. Only around mid May was he ready to concentrate the French army. On 14 May at Péronne (with the duke of Bourbon and the Chevalier de St. George (Note: The pseudonym the Old Pretender used during this campaign.)) he ordered the army to concentrate around Cambrai, where on 20 May he convened a Council of War with the marshals Berwick, Montesquiou, and the Bavarian general d'Arco and other generals, where it was decided to raise the siege of Douai.The French army of Flanders left Cambrai on 22 May. It consisted of 153 battalions and 262 squadrons.

Marlborough and Prince Eugene had not been idle in the meantime. As they expected Villars to act, they had been studying the terrain around Douai to prepare for a possible decisive battle with the French army. As the terrain north and south of the city was too difficult for an enemy to use, they decided on two possible battlefields, one to the east of the city on the way to Bouchain and Valenciennes, the other in the plain of Lens that stretched from Vitry on the Scarpe to Montigny on the Deûle river, where the two rivers came closest. Both potential battlefields were then reinforced with fieldworks consisting of redans that could hold at least a battalion each behind an earthen berm. The fieldworks were made ready to hold artillery, including heavy siege guns to cover the field of fire. (Note: Villars had used the same tactic himself at the Battle of Malplaquet with good results.) They concentrated their army near the village of Esquerchin, and improved the roads from that location, to either prepared battle site, and put several new bridges across the Scarpe, to make swift movement possible.

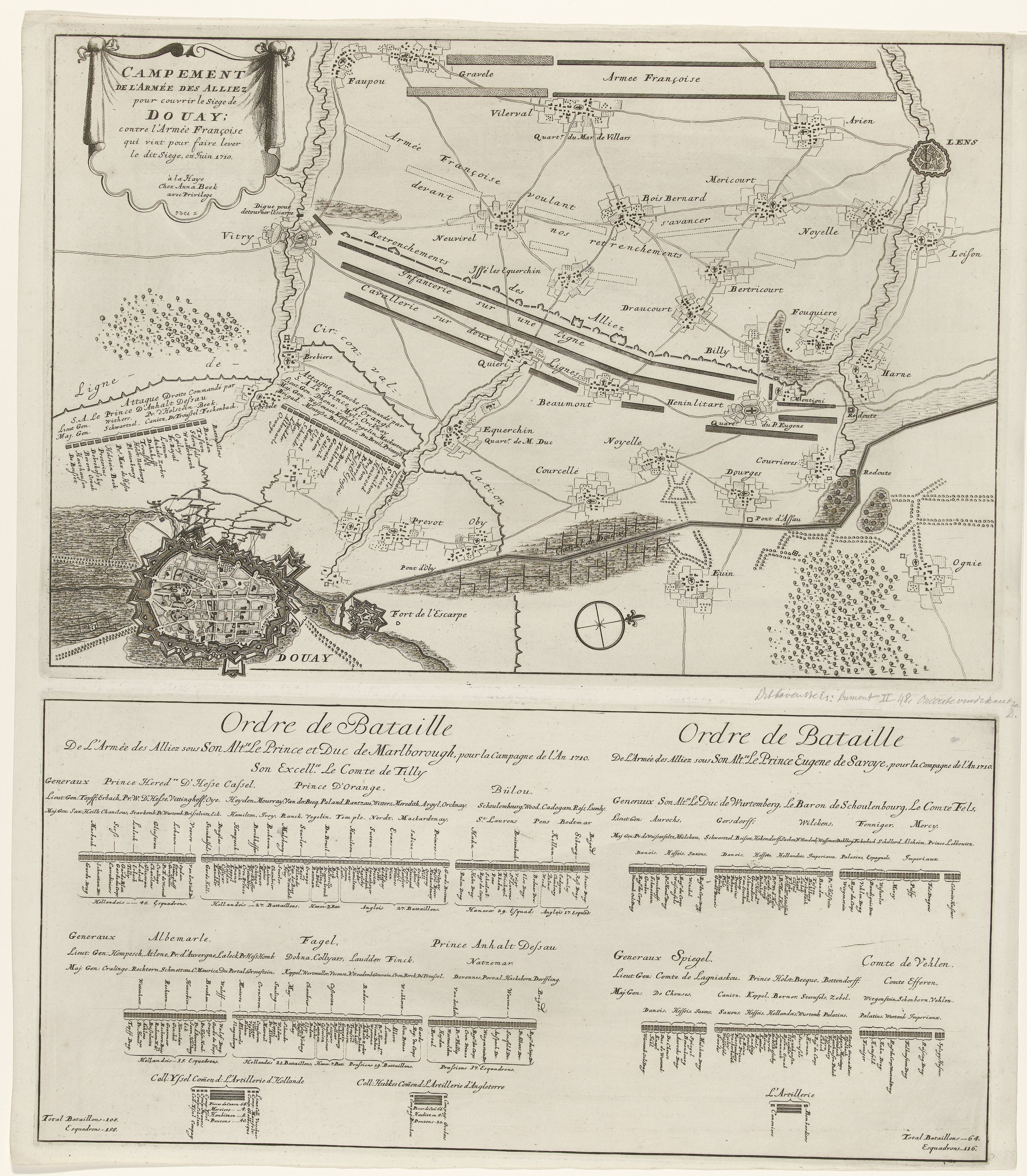
Map of the camp of the Allied army covering the siege (Note: The map was engraved by Pieter van Call. It became an illustration in Mont, Jean du (1729). Oorlogskundige beschryving van de veldslagen en belegeringen, der drie (...) wydvermaarde krygsoversten (...) den Prins Eugenius van Savoye, den (...) Hertog van Marlborough, en den Prins van Oranje en Nassau-Vriesland (in Dutch).. Under the map an order of battle is printed.)

Villars approached the Allied army on 24 May, when he captured the castle of Oizy near Arleux where general Tilly had his headquarters. This led to spirited artillery duels between both sides. Villars then decided that the approach from the direction of Arras would be more advantageous, so he crossed the Scarpe on several places on 28 and 29 May to travel to that city, where he concentrated his army in the next few days. He did not experience any opposition from the Allied forces as Marlborough and Prince Eugene had decided to concentrate their own forces in the prepared line in the plain of Lens in view of Villars' movement.

On 30 May Villars ordered his army to advance to the Allied line in three divisions commanded by Berwick (right wing), Arco (left wing), and Montesquiou and himself (center). They deployed opposite the already deployed Allied army in the usual way with the infantry in the middle and the cavalry on either wing. This movement surprised the Allied commanders somewhat, as the fieldworks had not been fully completed yet. In all haste 20 battalions from the besieging troops of the Prince of Orange were also directed to the front line, to reinforce the field army. That army was deployed in one line of infantry formations, with two lines of cavalry formations behind them. The Allied left wing, consisting mostly of British and Dutch troops under Marlborough and Tilly was supported on the Scarpe river on its extreme left, while the Imperialist troops of Prince Eugene in the right wing were supported on the extreme right on a marsh on the bank of the Deûle. The village of Esquerchin lay in the middle in front of the battle formation. The battle formation of the French was the mirror image of the Allied one, with the village of Bernard in the middle, which was located on a slight elevation that enabled Villars to overlook the battle site. This advantageous location, however, had the significant disadvantage that a deep brook with steep banks ran through the plain, that divided his army. Villars rode with his staff to Bernard to reconnoitre the opposing dispositions and the Allied fieldworks, which may have made him a bit uncertain. In any case that night he convened another council of war where opinions were divided between those who thought the prospect of an open battle too dangerous (which also was the opinion of the government in Paris), and those who were optimistic that with a slight change in disposition of the French army the Allies could be beaten. The first opinion prevailed. (Note: According to Quincy there was no difference of opinion: all those who took part in the council of war thought the engagement of a superior force too dangerous.) In any case Villars remained for four more days in his position, before he finally decided to retreat on 4 June in the direction of Atrecht. Nothing had been accomplished; the only result was that it had been demonstrated to the garrison of Douai that no speedy relief was to be expected. (Note: De Vryer remarks that not only Villars missed an opportunity. The Allied leaders might have forced a battle themselves, instead of awaiting the initiative of Villars, and so possibly have broken the strategic stalemate, though the risks were large for them also.)

=== The endgame ===
During the period in which Villars made his threatening movements the siege had been more or less on hold, as the detachment of the Prince of Orange troops to the front had weakened the besieging forces significantly. De Vryer tells the anecdote that a patrol sent out by Albergotti to Valenciennes ecountered no opposition at all. But now that the threat had diminished the circumvallation was again fully manned by the besieging troops and the trenches extended closer and closer to the fortress's walls, despite numerous sorties (Note: Thirty-two in all. Thoyras gives a number of examples. On 29 May the besieged sallied forth against the trenches on the right, but were repulsed with a loss of 125 officers and men.The next day the garrison of the Scarpe fortress made a sortie all the way to the bridge at Râche with the objective of intercepting the Allied bread wagons, but 300 British dragoons under colonel Caldwell thwarted them. The 31st of May another sortie captured part of the baggage of general François Nicolas Fagel and a good number of cattle.) that Albergotti ordered to hinder that work. Underground the Allied miners and French counterminers fought each other on life and death. Attempts to storm the defenses were thwarted by mines the French exploded under the Forlorn hope. Between 5 and 19 June the besiegers, especially on the right, made steady progress, making several lodgements on first the glacis and counterscarp, and later even on the covertway. The artillery was able to make several breaches in the ramparts. On 19 June these breaches were judged large enough to chance a storm attack. This resulted in heavy casualties on both sides. On the 24th of June the Prince of Anhalt launched a successful attack on two ravelins, so that his troops could lodge there with little resistance. The small Scarpe fortress north of the city was finally also invested by the Allies on 22 June. (Note: See Quincy for a very detailed description of the besieging operations and the French counterattacks during the period after Villars had departed.) This ever more narrowing encirclement made Albergotti see that the game was up. It was not his task to fight to the bitter end. On the contrary, the surrender of the fortress had always been calculated by the French government, and it was deemed important by that government that in such a case the damage should be minimized. It was the usual policy for besieged commanders that they would sue for an advantageous capitulation if it became clear that the end was near. So on 25 June Albergotti hoisted a white flag to signal his desire to talk terms. After the usual exchange of hostages parlimentaires met and after some haggling Albergotti agreed to surrender both the city and the outlying Scarpe fortress on the condition of the honours of war and a safe conduct for him and his troops to Cambrai; (Note: See Quincy for the details of the capitulation convention.) they left the fortress on 29 June 1710 as free men.

Albergotti left with 4500 troops, which implies that the French losses had amounted to about 3000 men. The Allied forces on the other hand lost 8000 killed and wounded.

== Aftermath ==
As the fortress was now in Allied hands the commanders appointed general Reinhard Vincent Graf von Hompesch as the new governor of the city and the military engineer Des Roques as the governor of the Scarpe fortress. The original plan had been to invest Cambrai as the next fortress on the way to Paris, but too much time had been lost. Besides Villars had by now concentrated his mobile army there, which made a siege virtually impossible. Quartermaster general Van Dopff preferred to invest Arras instead, because in that case Villars would be forced to engage in an open battle, as he had just narrowly avoided near Douai. As alternatives he proposed either Béthune or Aire, but those were less useful to break through the frontière de fer. The commanders nevertheless decided to invest Béthune first, and not Arras, because the horses of the French army had by then devoured all grass near Arras, so Arras was infeasible for practical reasons.

Supply problems remained severe for both armies. The Allies used the Lys for their supply transports from their base of operations in Ghent. One such transport under the direction of general Frederick Christiaan van Reede, 2nd Earl of Athlone was intercepted by a force from the fortress city Ypres on 19 September 1710 and decisively defeated by the superior French force, with a large loss of men, while Van Reede was made prisoner. The French completely destroyed the convoy, blowing up the vessels that transported gunpowder which caused such an explosion that the riverbed of the Lys was severely damaged, further hindering transport by water for a while. (Note: This is anecdotal evidence for the reason why 18th-century military commanders were wise not to follow the modern practice of bypassing fortresses, leaving such fortresses and their garrisons as a threat to their supply lines.)

King Louis XIV rewarded Albergotti with the blue ribbon of the Order of the Holy Spirit and the governorship of the Saarlouis fortress. Other officers of the French garrison were also awarded appropriate honors.

== Sources ==
- Nimwegen, O. van (2020). De Veertigjarige Oorlog 1672–1712 (in Dutch). Prometheus. ISBN 978-90-446-3871-4.
- Rapin de Thoyras, M.P. (1763). The History of England. Vol. 17. T. Osborne and J. Shipton.
- Vryer, A. de (1740). Histori van Joan Churchil, hertog van Marlborough en prins van Mindelheim (in Dutch). Vol. 4.
- Wijn, J.W. (1959). Het Staatsche Leger: Deel VIII-2 Het tijdperk van de Spaanse Successieoorlog 1706–1710 (The Dutch States Army: Part VIII-2 The era of the War of the Spanish Succession 1706–1710) (in Dutch). Martinus Nijhoff.
- Wijn, J.W. (1964). Het Staatsche Leger: Deel VIII-3 Het tijdperk van de Spaanse Successieoorlog 1711–1715 (The Dutch States Army: Part VIII-3 The era of the War of the Spanish Succession 1702–1705) (in Dutch). Martinus Nijhoff.
- Lamigue, Isaac (1716). Het leven van Zyne Hoogheit Johan Willem Friso volume 1 (in Dutch). Johannes Oosterwyk.
- Quincy, C. Sevin de (1726). Histoire militaire du regne de Louis Le Grand, roy de France: où l'on trouve un détail de toutes les batailles, sieges, combats particuliers, & generalement de toutes les actions de guerre qui se sont passées pendant le cours de son Regne, tant sur Terre que sur Mer ... on y a joint un traité particulier de pratiques & de Maximes de l'Art Militaire (in French). Vol. 6. Denis Mariette.
