= Douai (disambiguation) =

Douai is a town and commune in northern France.

Douai may also refer to:

== In or around the French commune ==
- Arrondissement of Douai, an administrative division
- Canton of Douai, an administrative division
- Douai station in the town
- University of Douai

== Other ==
- Douai Mountain in the Canadian Rockies
- Adolph Douai (1819–1888), German-American Marxist
- Douai Abbey, Benedictine abbey in Berkshire, England
  - Douai School run by the abbey

== See also ==
- Douay–Rheims Bible, an English translation used by the Catholic Church
