= François Zénobe Philippe Albergotti =

French lieutenant-general of Italian extraction

- Born: 25 May 1654; Florence
- Died: 23 March 1717 (aged 62); Paris
- Relatives: Madeleine Bardi (mother); Nerozzo Albergotti (father)
- Military career
- Allegiance: Kingdom of France
- Branch: Infantry
- Service years: 1671 – 1717
- Rank: Lieutenant general
- Commands: Douai; Saarlouis
- Conflicts: Franco-Dutch War; Battle of Seneffe; Valenciennes; Cambrai; Cambrai; Ghent; Ypres; Battle of Saint-Denis (1678); War of the Reunions; Siege of Luxembourg (1684); Nine Years' War; Battle of Walcourt; Fleurus; Siege of Mons (1691); Battle of Leuze; Siege of Namur (1692); Battle of Steenkerque; Neerwinden; Bombardment of Brussels; Siege of Ath (1697); War of the Spanish Succession; Chiari; Cremona; San Vittoria; Battle of Luzzara; Siege of Governolo; Battle of Cassano (1705); Battle of Calcinato; Battle of Oudenarde; Battle of Malplaquet; Siege of Douai (1710); Battle of Denain; Siege of Douai (1712); Rhine campaign of 1713
- Awards: Chevalier de Saint-Louis; Chevalier du Saint Esprit

François Zénobe Philippe Albergotti, count of Albergotti (Florence, 25 May 1654 - Paris, 23 March 1717) was a French lieutenant-general of Italian extraction. He served with distinction in the Franco-Dutch War, the War of the Reunions, the Nine Years' War and the War of the Spanish Succession, both in the Italy and Southern France theater, and in the Flanders and German theaters. He lost the fortress of Douai as commander in 1710, but regained it in 1712. He received the highest military honors from king Louis XIV.

== Life ==
=== Personal life ===
Albergotti was the second son of Madeleine Bardi and senator of Florence Nerozzo Albergotti. He was apparently never married, and had no issue. He was naturalized as a French subject in February 1681. His universal heir was a nephew: Alexandre, Marquis de Andregotti.

=== Career ===
Albergotti entered French service on 27 March 1671 as an ensign in the regiment Royal-Italien. He was an ensign and later sous-lieutenant in the Guards in 1674 and 1677. On 27 January 1678 he was commissioned as lieutenant-colonel in the regiment Royal-Italien. On 10 March 1690 he was promoted to brigadier of the infantry. On 8 February 1694 he was made a chevalier de St. Louis. On 6 June 1694 he was promoted to Maréchal de camp. On 12 February 1700 he was commissioned as colonel-lieutenant of the regiment Royal-Montferrat. He was promoted to lieutenant-general on 29 January 1702. On 29 April 1705 he was commissioned as colonel-lieutenant of the Regiment Royal-Italien, as successor to his uncle Magalotti.

In the Franco-Dutch War he was present at the sieges and captures of Wesel, Nijmegen, Grave, Zaltbommel, and Loevestein Castle in 1672. In 1673 he was present at the attacks on Woerden and Ameide. As an ensign in the Guards he was wounded on 26 February 1674 at the siege of Moelingen. He was even more severely wounded at the Battle of Seneffe, after which he was invalided out for two years. Back in service he was present at the siege of Valenciennes and of Cambrai in 1677. In 1678 he took part in the sieges of Ghent and Ypres, and the Battle of Saint-Denis (1678).

During the War of the Reunions he was part of the army that covered the Siege of Luxembourg (1684)

During the Nine Years' War he was present at the Battle of Walcourt in 1689. In 1690 he distinguished himself at Fleurus. In 1691 he was wounded in the face at the Siege of Mons (1691). Nevertheless, he took part in the Battle of Leuze later that year. The next year he took part in the Siege of Namur (1692) and the Battle of Steenkerque, after he was honored to be sent to Versailles to inform king Louis XIV of the glorious result of that battle for France. In 1693 he fought at Neerwinden and again was honored with the mission to personally inform the king of the victory and present him with the 80 enemy standards captured at the battle. In 1694 he took part in the campaign under Louis, Grand Dauphin. In 1695 he was present at the Bombardment of Brussels with François de Neufville, 2nd Duke of Villeroy. In 1697 he took part in the Siege of Ath (1697). In 1698 he served in the army camp at Compiègne.

During the War of the Spanish Succession he was first employed in the Italian theater, where he fought at Chiari in 1701 and Cremona in 1702. Employed in the defense of Cremona he surprised a superior enemy force of dragoons ensconced in a castle, and defeated them, killing 60 and taking prisoners on 30 June 1702. He distinguished himself again at San Vittoria and Battle of Luzzara, and while helping to cover the Siege of Governolo fought an action at San Felice in January 1703. After Governolo had been captured, he in March 1703 near Rivara, surprised an enemy regiment and defeated it, killing 30 and making 54 prisoner, while capturing 60 horses. In 1704 he fought at the Vercelli, Ivrea, and Verrua. In 1705 he took part in the Battle of Cassano (1705). In 1706 he took part in the Battle of Calcinato, where he again distinguished himself.

In 1707 he transferred to the Flanders theater of war, first under Louis Joseph, Duke of Vendôme, and later under Louis, Duke of Burgundy. He fought in the Battle of Oudenarde in 1708. In 1709 he was wounded at the Battle of Malplaquet under Claude Louis Hector de Villars, 1st Duke of Villars.

In 1710 he was appointed governor of the fortress of Douai in April, just before the start of the Siege of Douai (1710). He bravely defended the fortress against a superior enemy for 52 days, (Note: Courcelles states that he paid his men from his own money, after selling a silver vessel.) until he was finally forced to surrender on 25 June 1710. But he managed to obtain a favorable capitulation, so that he was able to march off with the honors of war to Cambrai, without his troops being made prisoners of war. King Louis made him a Chevalier du Saint Esprit in recognition and made him governor of the fortress of Saarlouis in 1711. In 1712 after taking part in the Battle of Denain, he had the satisfaction of putting Douai under siege himself and capturing the fortress on 8 September 1712.

After the Peace of Utrecht Albergotti took part in the Rhine campaign of 1713 capturing the fortress Mannheim in June 1713 and taking part in the siege and capture of Landau and Fribourg.

Albergotti died in Paris on 23 March 1717 and was buried in the church of Saint-Eustache, Paris.

=== Citations ===
Some contemporaries of Albergotti have left impressions of him.

Louis de Rouvroy, duc de Saint-Simon wrote:

"Albergotti, son neveu, eût le Royal-Italien. Il avait plus d'esprit que son oncle, de grands talents pour la guerre et beaucoup de valeur, plus d'ambition encore, et tous les moyens luy étoient bons. C'étoit un homme très dangereux, très intimement mauvais, et foncièrement malhonnête homme, avec un froid dédaigneux, et des jours sans dire une parole. Son oncle l'avoit initié dans la confiance de M. de Luxembourg, et, par là, dans la compagnie choisie de l'armée, qui lui fraya celle de la cour. Il étoit intimement aussi avec M. le prince de Conti pour la même raison, et fort bien avec Monsieur le Duc. Il fut accusé, et sa conduite le verifia, d'avoir passé d'un camp à l'autre, c'est-à-dire d'avoir toujours tenu à un filet à M. de Vendôme lors et depuis sa rupture avec M. de Luxembourg, M. le prince de Conti et leurs amis, et, après la mort de M. de Luxembourg, de s'être jeté de ce côté-là sans mesure. M. de Luxembourg fils, M. le prince de Conti et leurs amis s'en plaignoient fort en particulier; en public, ils gardèrent des dehors. Albergotti devint un favori de M. de Vendôme qui lui valut la protection de M. de Maine laquelle l'approcha de Madame de Maintenon. Je me suis étendu sur ce maître Italien; on verra dans la suite qu'il étoit bon de le connoître." (Note: "Albergotti, his nephew, had the Royal-Italian. He had more wit than his uncle, great talents for war and a great deal of valor, more ambition still, and all means were good for him. He was a very dangerous man, very intimately bad, and fundamentally dishonest man, with a disdainful coldness, and days without saying a word. His uncle had initiated him into the confidence of M. de Luxembourg, and thereby into the chosen company of the army, which paved the way for him to that of the court. He was also intimate with the Prince de Conti for the same reason, and very well with the Duke. He was accused, and his conduct proved it, of having passed from one camp to the other, that is to say of having always held M. de Vendôme in a snare at the time and since his break with M. de Luxembourg, the Prince de Conti and their friends, and, after the death of M. de Luxembourg, for throwing himself in that direction without measure. M. de Luxembourg junior, M. le prince de Conti and their friends complained very privately of it; in public, they kept straight faces. Albergott became a favorite of M. de Vendôme, who earned him the protection of M. de Maine, who brought him closer to Madame de Maintenon. I dwelt on this Italian master; we will see later that it was good to know him.)

And elsewhere:

"C’étoit un grand homme sec, à mine sombre, distraite et dédaigneuse, fort silencieux, les oreilles fort ouvertes et les yeux aussi. Obscur dans ses débauches, très avare et amassant beaucoup; excellent officier général pour les vues et pour l’exécution, mais fort dangereux pour un général d’armée et pour ceux qui servoient avec lui. Sa valeur étoit froide et des plus éprouvées et reconnue, avec laquelle toutefois les affronts les plus publics et les mieux assénés ne lui coûtoient rien à rembourser et à laisser pleinement tomber en faveur de sa fortune. (…) Il devint ainsi lieutenant général commandant des corps séparés, chevalier de l’ordre et gouverneur de Sarrelouis. Il avoit outre cela douze mille livres de pension. (…) Il n’étoit point marié, et ne fut regretté de personne. Son neveu eut son régiment royal-italien, qui valoit beaucoup, et Madame fit donner le gouvernement de Sarrelouis au prince de Talmont." (Note: "He was a tall, lean man, with a gloomy face, distracted and disdainful, very silent, his ears wide open and his eyes too. Obscure in his debauchery, very miserly and amassing much; excellent general officer for views and execution, but very dangerous for an army general and for those who served with him. His valor was cold, and most tried and recognized, with which, however, the most public and most afflicted affronts cost him nothing to repay and give up fully in favor of his fortune. (…) He thus became lieutenant general commanding separate corps, knight of the order and governor of Saarlouis. Besides that, he had a pension of twelve thousand pounds. (…) He was not married, and was not missed by anyone. Her nephew had his Royal-Italien regiment, which was worth a lot, and Madame had the government of Sarrelouis given to the Prince de Talmont.")

Villars had the following comment, after Albergotti had been slow in following his orders for the encirclement of Douai in 1712:

"...ma répartie fut vive, et telle qu’elle devoit être; je fus même tenté de lui enlever le commandement de ce quartier. Mais, pour éviter un déshonneur aussi marqué à un ancien lieutenant général qui prenoit un travers, mais qui étoit très brave d’ailleurs, et que j’estimois, je me contentais d’y ajouter des officiers généraux de confiance, et je priais le général de Broglie, dont le quartier joignait celui-là, d’y donner une principale attention." (Note: "...my repartee was lively, and such as it ought to be; I was even tempted to take the command of this district from him. But, to avoid such a marked dishonor to a former lieutenant general who took a wrong turn, but who was very brave besides, and whom I esteemed, I contented myself with adding some trusted general officers, and I asked the general de Broglie, whose district joined that one, to give it a principal attention...")

== Sources ==
- Courcelles, Jean Baptiste Pierre Jullien de; Courcelles, Jean-Baptiste-Pierre, eds. (1820). "Albergotti, François-Zénobe-Philippe (comte de)". Dictionnaire historique et biographique des généraux français, depuis le onzième siècle jusqu'en 1820 (in French). Vol. 1. pp. 38–42.
- 'Ordre du Saint-Esprit, ed. (1873). "François-Zénobe-Philippe Albergotti". Abrégé historique des Chevaliers et Officiers Commandeurs de l'Ordre du Saint-Esprit, depuis son institution jusqu'à la révolution de 1789: Suivi de la liste des personnes admises aux honneurs de la Cour (in French). Geneve: Jules-Guillaume Fick. pp. 322–323.
- Tausin, H. (1903). "François-Zénoble-Philippe Albergotti". Notice historique sur Bardo di Bardi Magalotti: lieutenant général des armées du Roi et gouverneur de Valenciennes, 1629-1705. E.Lechevaliere. p. 24.
