= Jacques François de Chastenet de Puységur =

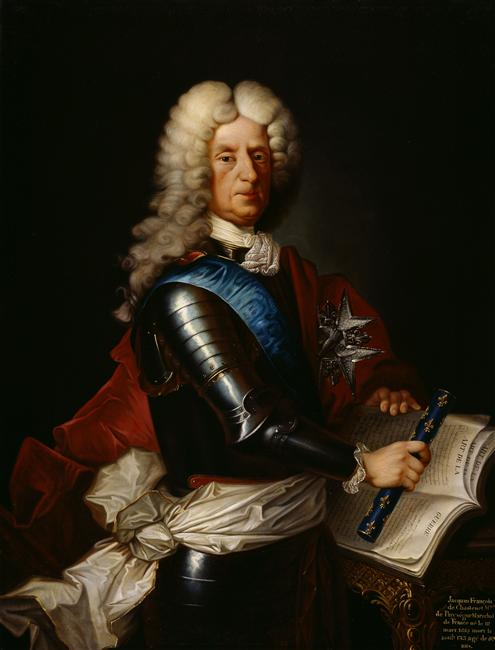
A painting of Jacques François de Chastenet de Puységur by an unknown artist.

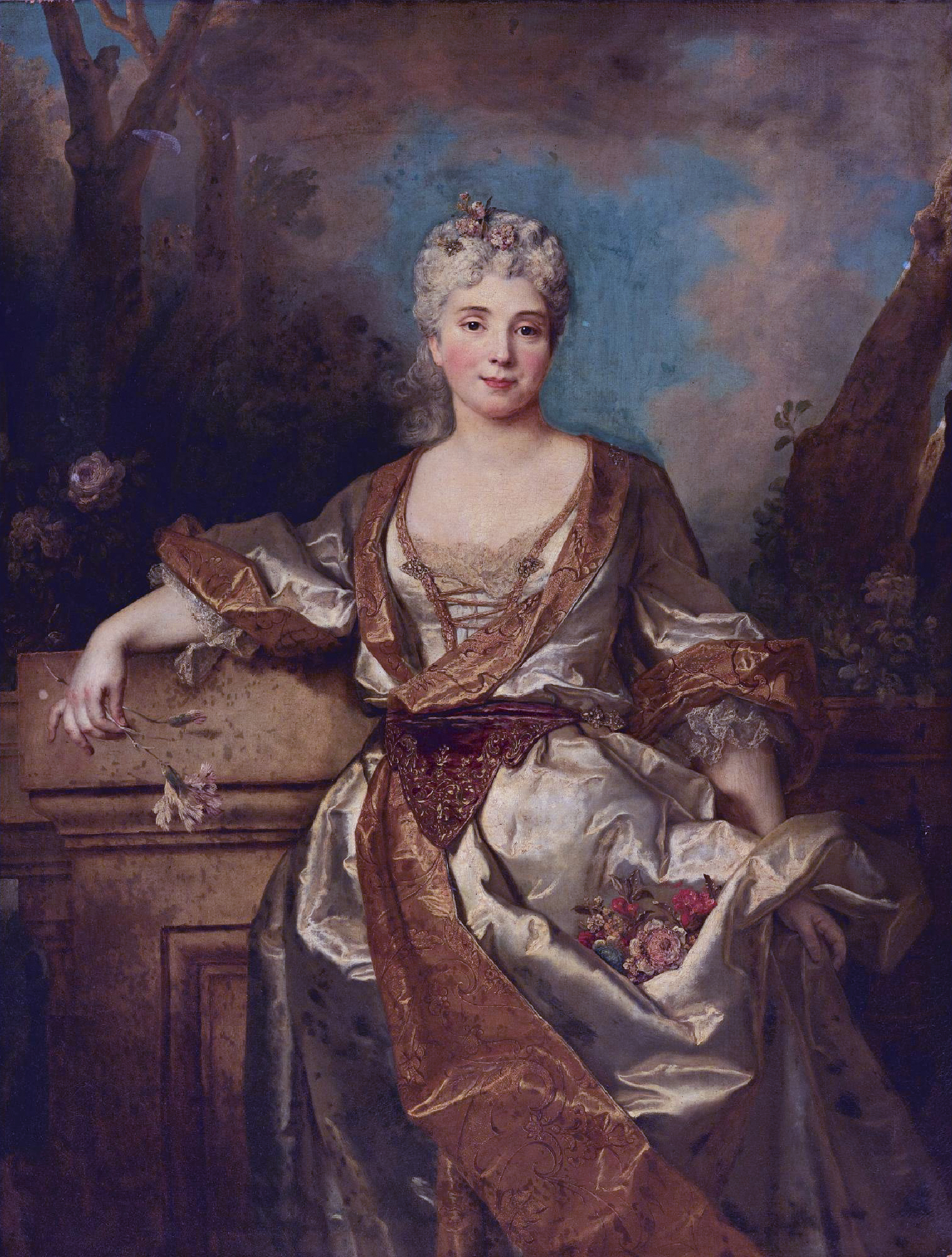
His wife Jeanne de Fourcy in 1726, by Nicolas de Largillière.

Jacques-François de Chastenet, Marquis de Puységur (August 13, 1656 - August 15, 1743) was a French military and nobleman, who fought in all the French Wars between 1667 and 1734. He was a member of the War Council during the period of the Polysynody (1715-18) and was raised to the dignity of Marshal of France by King Louis XV in 1734.

== Biography ==
He was a son of Jacques de Chastenet de Puységur, Viscount of Buzancy (1600-1682), and his first wife, Antoinette de Varlet.

He first saw action in 1677, fighting in Flanders against the Spanish during the Franco-Dutch War as a lieutenant in the King's Regiment. He participated in the Siege of Valenciennes (1676–1677) and Cambrai, and the following year in the captures of Ghent (March 9) and Ypres (April 8), and the Battle of Saint-Denis near Mons (August 14).
Promoted to adjutant major in 1682, he participated in the capture of Luxembourg (1684). In 1688, he transferred to the Army of Germany, taking part in the capture of Philipsburg (October 29), where he was wounded; the conquest of Mannheim and the surrender of Speyer, Worms, Oppenheim, Trier, and Frankfurt. Returning to Flanders, he participated in many campaigns of the Nine Years' War (1688-1697) and the following War of the Spanish Succession.
At the end of 1703, he was assigned to Spain as Director General of Infantry and Cavalry, and in command of the first division of troops sent by Louis XIV to aid Philip V. He crossed the border in February 1704 and went to the Extremadura theater of operations, encamping in Plasencia under the command of Marshals Tessé and Boufflers. In 1706 he joined the army of Catalonia, participating in the failed siege of Barcelona, which had to be lifted in May 1706.
In 1707 he returned to France and went back to Flanders, under Vendôme's command. He fought at Oudenarde (July 11, 1708) and the defeat at Malplaquet (September 11, 1709). After remaining on the defensive in 1710 and 1711, in 1712 he fought at Denain (July 24), and in the captures of Marchiennes, Douai, Quesnoy, and Bouchain. In 1713 he was assigned to the Army of the Rhine and participated in the successful Rhine campaign of 1713.

After the war, he was appointed a War Councilor on November 3, 1715, and remained in Paris until 1733, when the War of the Polish Succession broke out. He was reassigned to the Army of the Rhine, serving in the capture of Kehl (October 28). On March 30, 1734, he was appointed commander-in-chief of the Army of Flanders—a post he held for many years, along with other governorships in northern France—and on June 14, the King promoted him to the rank of Marshal of France to the general acclaim of the public, who greatly appreciated his integrity and honesty. In his final days, he was created a Knight of the Order of the Holy Spirit and of Saint Michael (February 2, 1739).

=== Military theorist ===
Jacques François de Chastenet de Puységur was during his lifetime a logistics specialist, he was regularly consulted by Louis XIV on this matter.. He was also a theorist, who thought extensively about the evolution of warfare, particularly as a result of the rise in the power of firearms and the introduction of the bayonet.

He wrote a treatise called L’Art de la guerre ("The art of war") at the end of his life, based on various memoirs and notes he had written throughout his career, outlining the state of the art of war during his time. The manuscript, containing his principles and rules of warfare, was published in France by his son in 1749, six years after his death. The work was translated into German by Georg Rudolph Fäsch (1710–1787).

=== Marriage and children ===
He married Jeanne de Fourcy (1692-1737), daughter of Henri de Fourcy, Count of Chessy, on September 23, 1714. They had 3 daughters and 1 son, François-Jacques (1716-1782), who became a lieutenant-général. Through his son, he was the grandfather of Amand-Marie-Jacques de Chastenet, Marquis of Puységur, an expert in hypnotism.
