= Lambres-lez-Douai =

- Commune
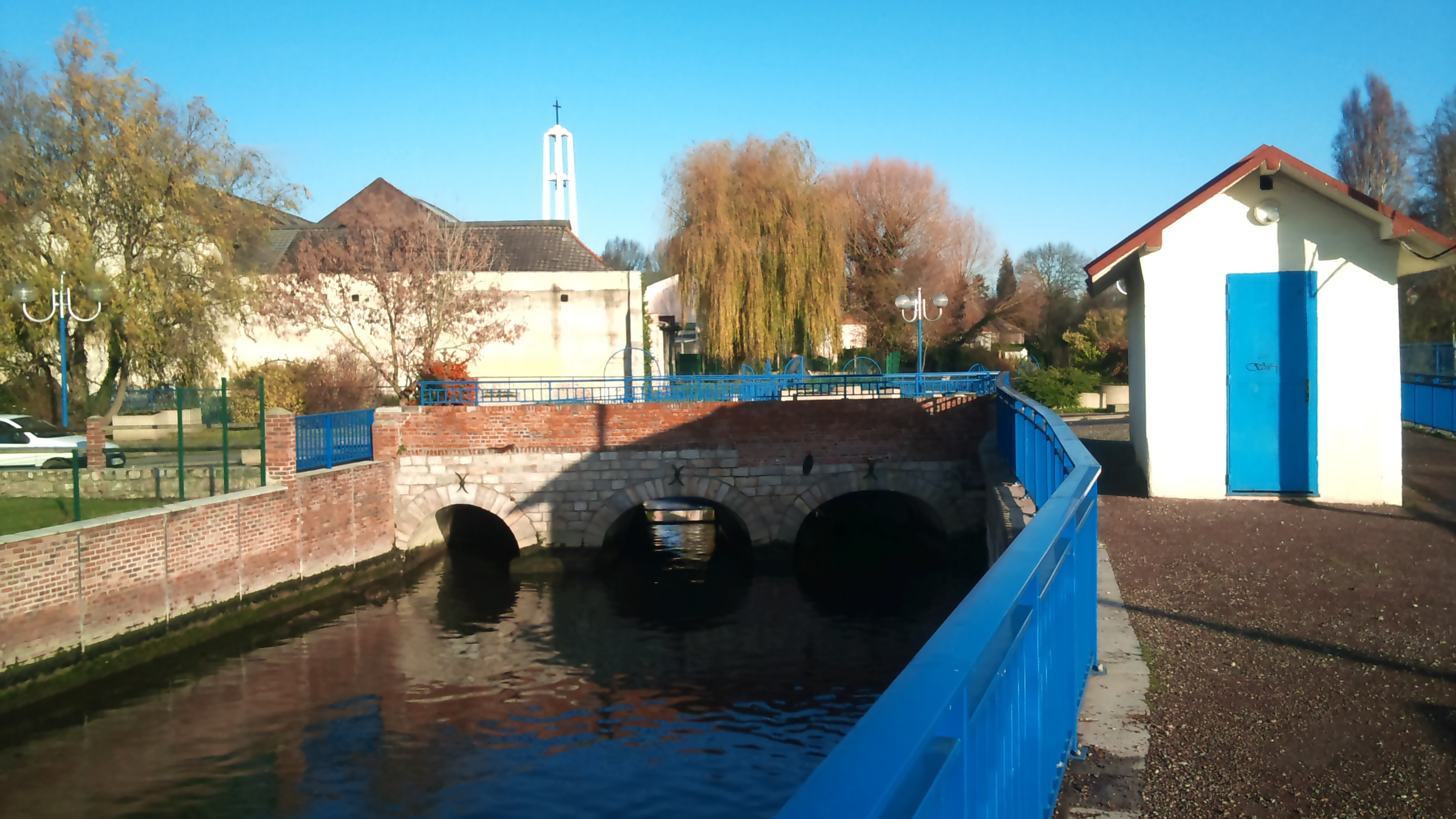
- Quai Danton in Lambres-lez-Douai

- Coat of arms
- Location of Lambres-lez-Douai
- Location within France Location within Hauts-de-France
- Coordinates: 50°21′11″N 3°04′05″E
- Country: France
- Region: Hauts-de-France
- Department: Nord
- Arrondissement: Douai
- Canton: Douai
- Intercommunality: Douaisis Agglo

Government
  - Mayor (2023–2026): Caroline Sanchez
- Area^{1}: 8.81 km^{2} (3.40 sq mi)
- Elevation: 30 m (98 ft)
- Highest elevation: 42 m (138 ft)
- Lowest elevation: 23 m (75 ft)
- Population (2023): 4,883
  - Density: 554/km^{2} (1,440/sq mi)
- Time zone: UTC+01:00 (CET)
  - Summer (DST): UTC+02:00 (CEST)
- INSEE/Postal code: 59329 /59552
- ^{1} French Land Register data, which excludes lakes, ponds, glaciers > 1 km^{2} (0.386 sq mi or 247 acres) and river estuaries.

Lambres-lez-Douai (French pronunciation: [lɑ̃bʁ le dwɛ], literally Lambres near Douai) is a commune in the Nord department in northern France.

== Population ==
Historical population
Year	Pop.	±% p.a.
1968	5,159	—
1975	5,509	+0.94%
1982	5,087	−1.13%
1990	5,043	−0.11%
1999	4,911	−0.29%
2007	5,253	+0.85%
2012	5,057	−0.76%
2017	5,125	+0.27%
2023	4,883	−0.80%
Source: INSEE

== Heraldry ==
Arms of Lambres-lez-Douai	The arms of Lambres-lez-Douai are blazoned : Argent, 3 2-handled pots sable, overall a canton gules billetty, a lion argent. (NB: the canton covers one pot)

== See also ==
- Communes of the Nord department
