= Lauwin-Planque =

- Commune
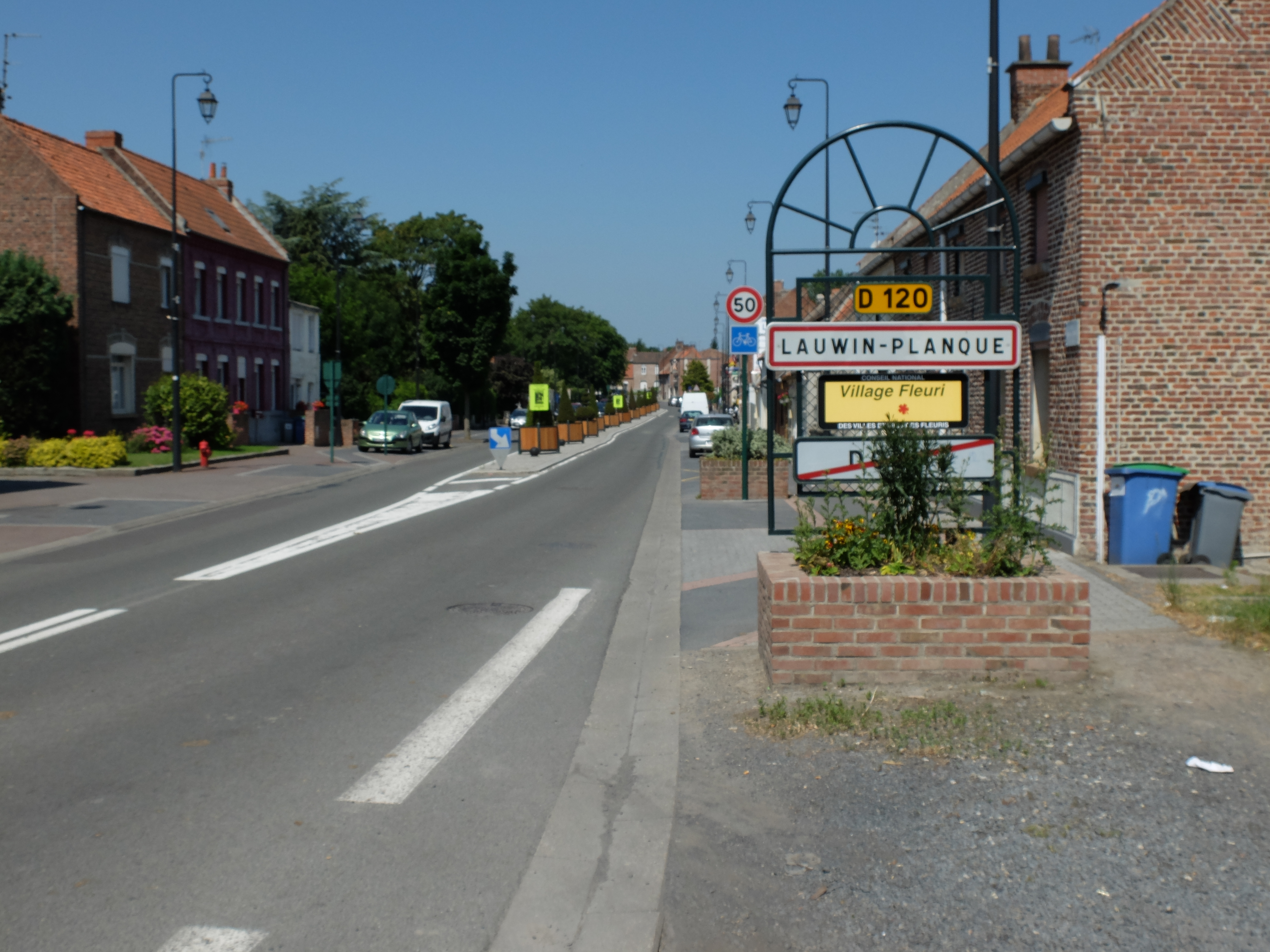
- The road into Lauwin-Planque

- Coat of arms
- Location of Lauwin-Planque
- Location within France Location within Hauts-de-France
- Coordinates: 50°23′26″N 3°02′42″E
- Country: France
- Region: Hauts-de-France
- Department: Nord
- Arrondissement: Douai
- Canton: Douai
- Intercommunality: Douaisis Agglo

Government
  - Mayor (2022–2026): Sonia Vallet
- Area^{1}: 3.67 km^{2} (1.42 sq mi)
- Elevation: 25 m (82 ft)
- Highest elevation: 40 m (130 ft)
- Lowest elevation: 22 m (72 ft)
- Population (2023): 1,608
  - Density: 438/km^{2} (1,130/sq mi)
- Time zone: UTC+01:00 (CET)
  - Summer (DST): UTC+02:00 (CEST)
- INSEE/Postal code: 59334 /59553
- ^{1} French Land Register data, which excludes lakes, ponds, glaciers > 1 km^{2} (0.386 sq mi or 247 acres) and river estuaries.

Lauwin-Planque (French pronunciation: [lovɛ̃ plɑ̃k]) is a commune in the Nord department in northern France.

== Heraldry ==
Arms of Lauwin-Planque	The arms of Lauwin-Planque are blazoned : Bendy gules and vair.

== See also ==
- Communes of the Nord department
