= Féchain =

- Commune
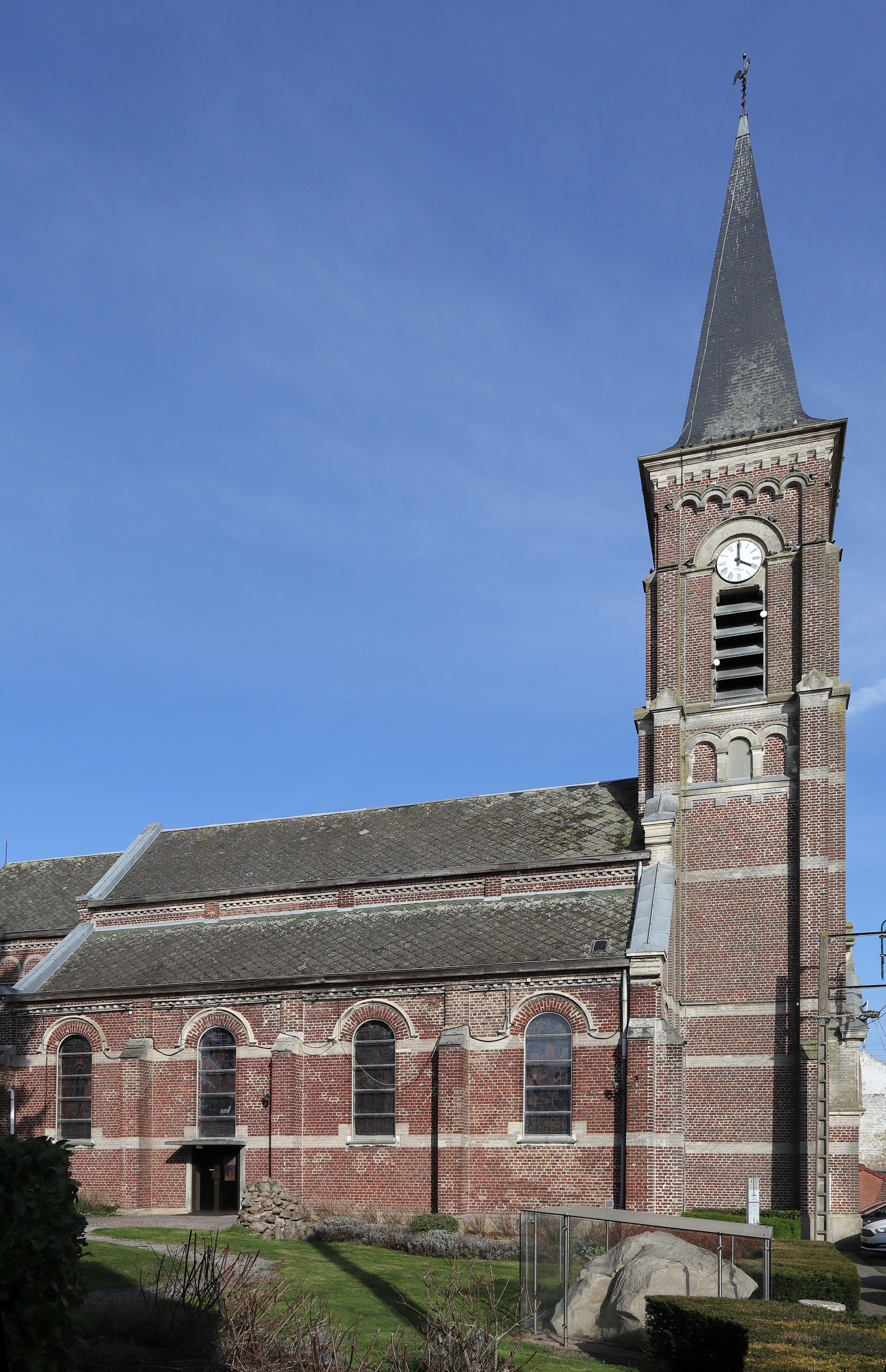
- Polisher and church of Féchain

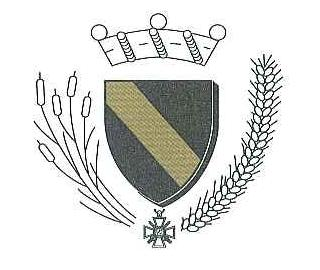
- Coat of arms
- Location of Féchain
- Location within France Location within Hauts-de-France
- Coordinates: 50°15′58″N 3°12′50″E
- Country: France
- Region: Hauts-de-France
- Department: Nord
- Arrondissement: Douai
- Canton: Aniche
- Intercommunality: Douaisis Agglo

Government
  - Mayor (2020–2026): Alain Wallart
- Area^{1}: 5.14 km^{2} (1.98 sq mi)
- Elevation: 38 m (125 ft)
- Highest elevation: 71 m (233 ft)
- Lowest elevation: 31 m (102 ft)
- Population (2023): 1,635
  - Density: 318/km^{2} (824/sq mi)
- Time zone: UTC+01:00 (CET)
  - Summer (DST): UTC+02:00 (CEST)
- INSEE/Postal code: 59224 /59247
- ^{1} French Land Register data, which excludes lakes, ponds, glaciers > 1 km^{2} (0.386 sq mi or 247 acres) and river estuaries.

Féchain (French pronunciation: [feʃɛ̃]) is a commune in the Nord department in northern France.

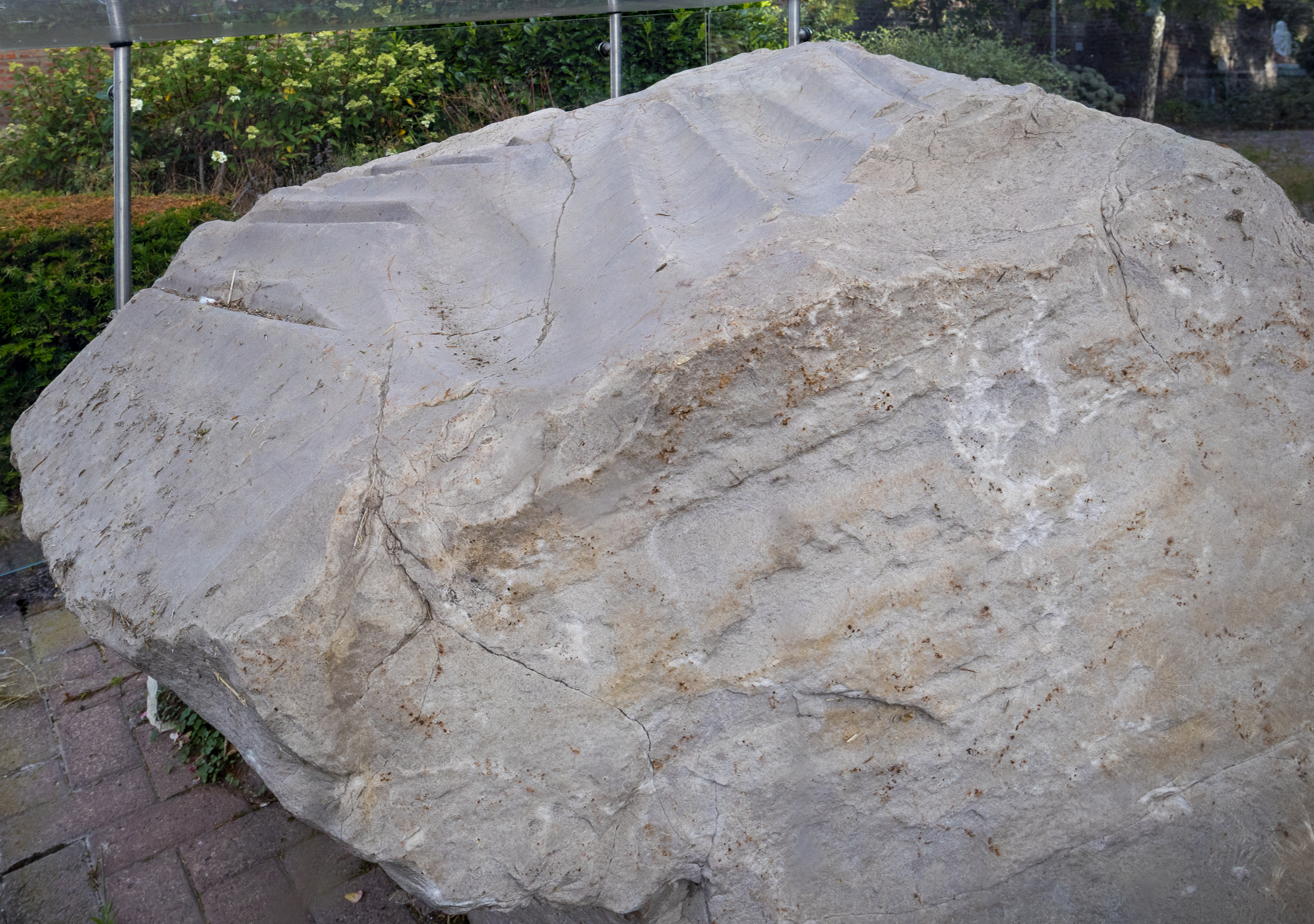
The Neolithic polisher

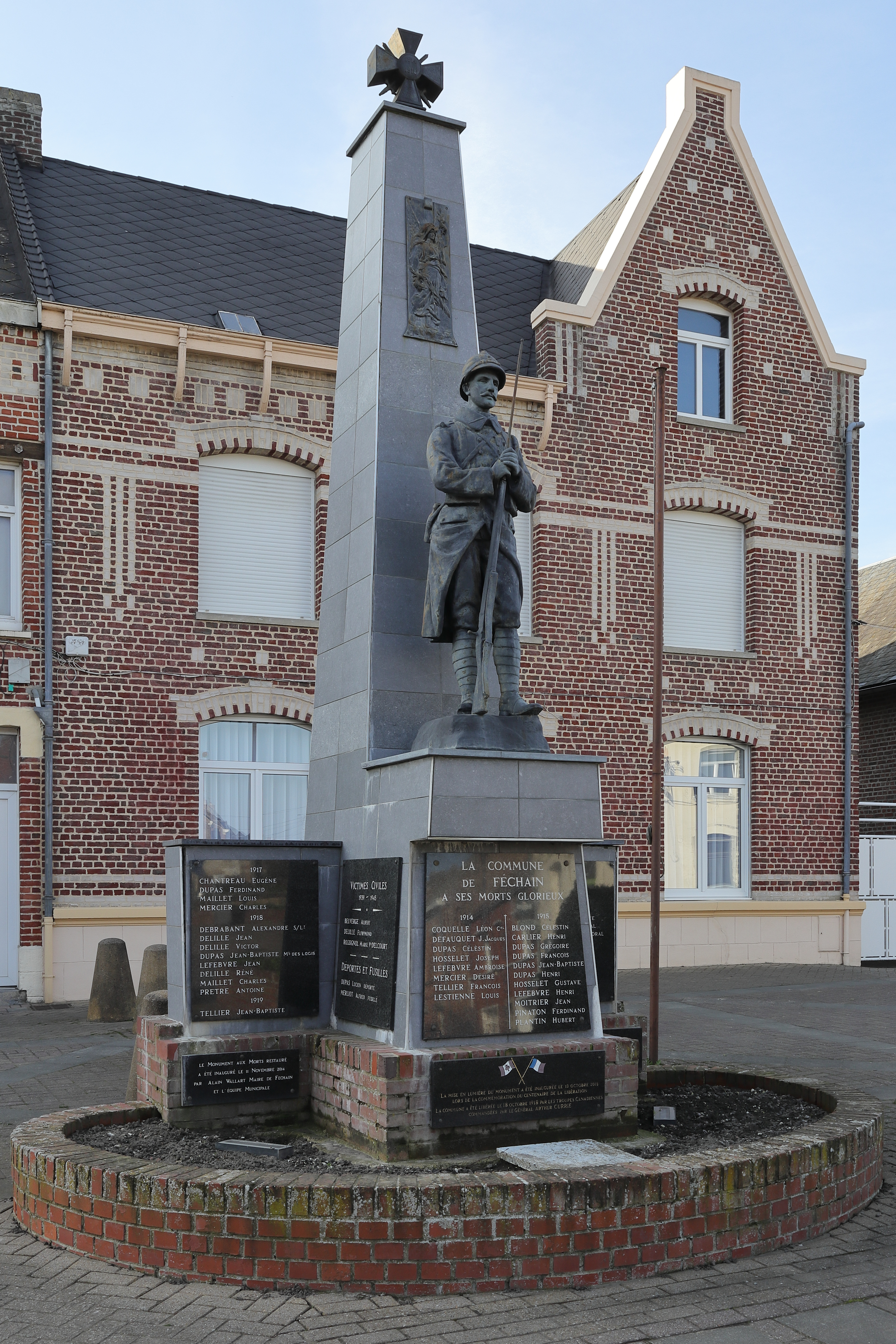
The war memorial

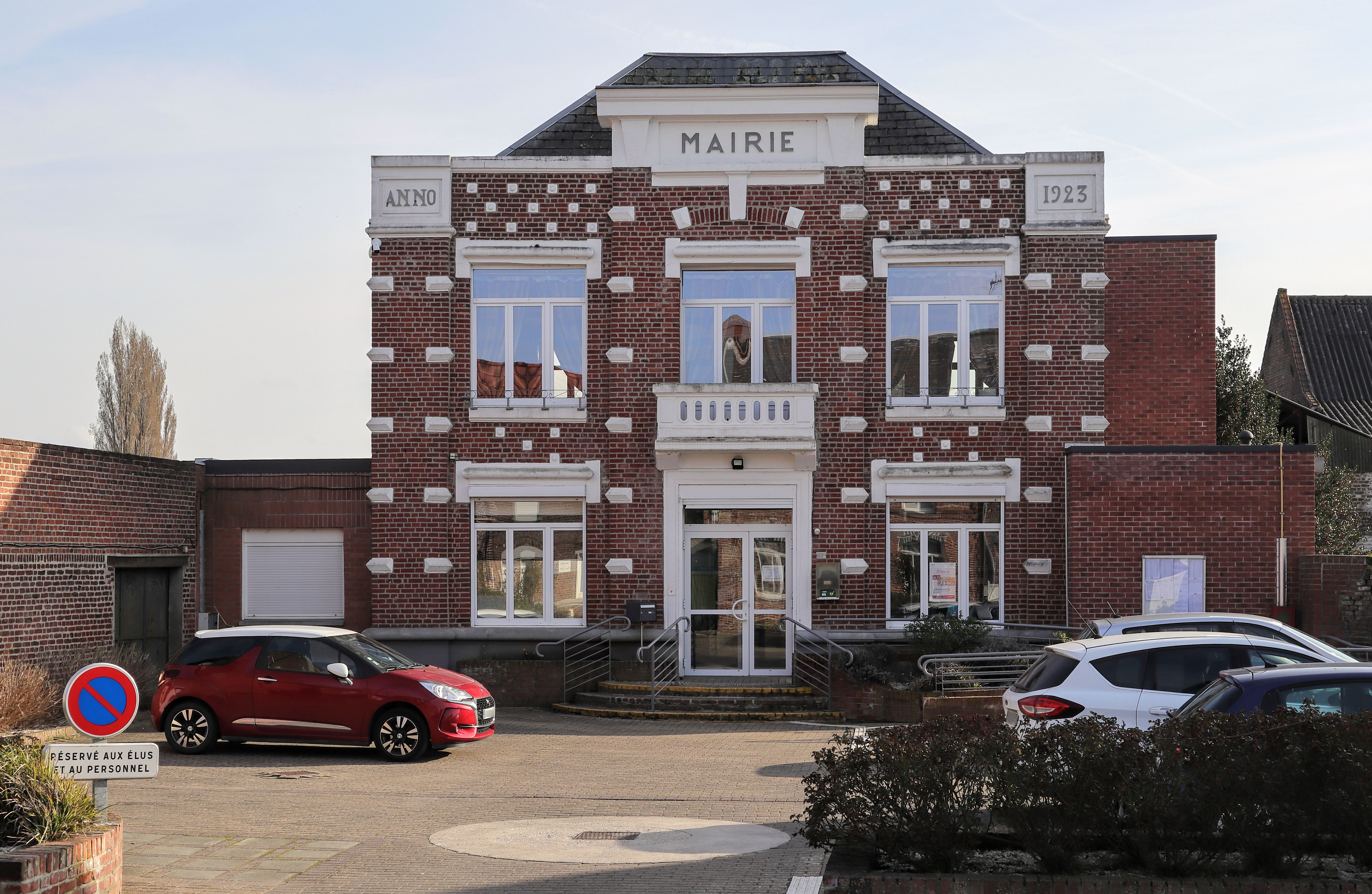
The town hall

== Heraldry ==
Arms of Féchain	The arms of Féchain are blazoned : Sable, a bend Or. (Cuincy and Féchain use the same arms.)

== See also ==
- Communes of the Nord department
