= Cuincy =

- Commune
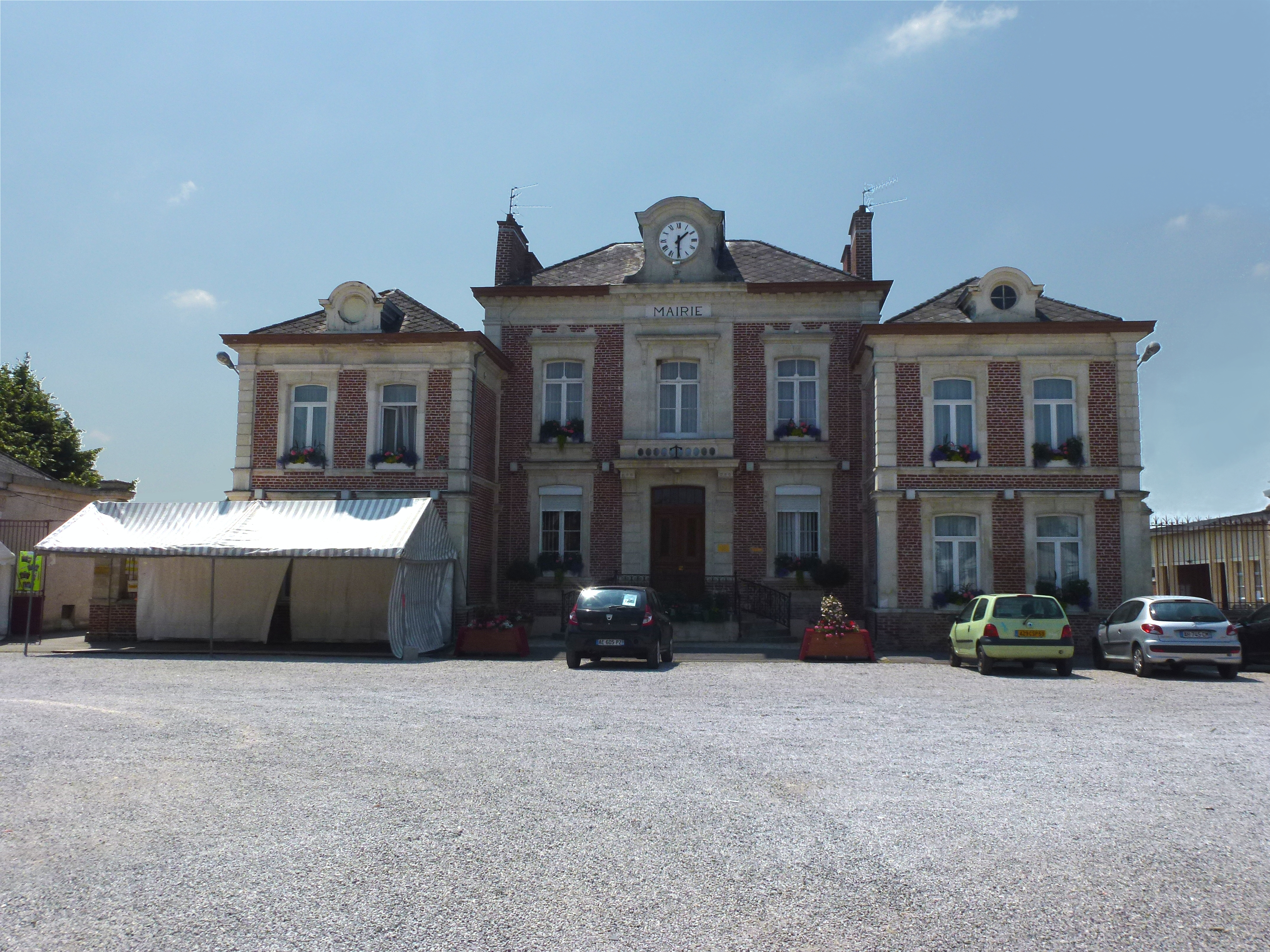
- The town hall in Cuincy

- Coat of arms
- Location of Cuincy
- Location within France Location within Hauts-de-France
- Coordinates: 50°22′59″N 3°02′49″E
- Country: France
- Region: Hauts-de-France
- Department: Nord
- Arrondissement: Douai
- Canton: Douai
- Intercommunality: Douaisis Agglo

Government
  - Mayor (2020–2026): Claude Hégo
- Area^{1}: 7.01 km^{2} (2.71 sq mi)
- Elevation: 27 m (89 ft)
- Highest elevation: 44 m (144 ft)
- Lowest elevation: 23 m (75 ft)
- Population (2023): 6,467
  - Density: 923/km^{2} (2,390/sq mi)
- Time zone: UTC+01:00 (CET)
  - Summer (DST): UTC+02:00 (CEST)
- INSEE/Postal code: 59165 /59553
- ^{1} French Land Register data, which excludes lakes, ponds, glaciers > 1 km^{2} (0.386 sq mi or 247 acres) and river estuaries.

Cuincy (French pronunciation: [kyɛ̃s'i]) is a commune in the Nord department in northern France.

It is 2.5 km (1.6 mi) northwest of Douai.

== Population ==
Historical population
Year	Pop.	±% p.a.
1968	3,831	—
1975	6,175	+7.06%
1982	6,449	+0.62%
1990	7,204	+1.39%
1999	6,847	−0.56%
2007	6,645	−0.37%
2012	6,556	−0.27%
2017	6,435	−0.37%
2023	6,467	+0.08%
Source: INSEE

== Heraldry ==
Arms of Cuincy	The arms of Cuincy are blazoned : Sable, a bend Or. (Cuincy and Féchain use the same arms.)

== See also ==
- Communes of the Nord department
