= Siege of Cambrai (1677) =

Battle of the Franco-Dutch War

Coordinates: 50.1767°N 3.2356°E

- Part of the Franco-Dutch War
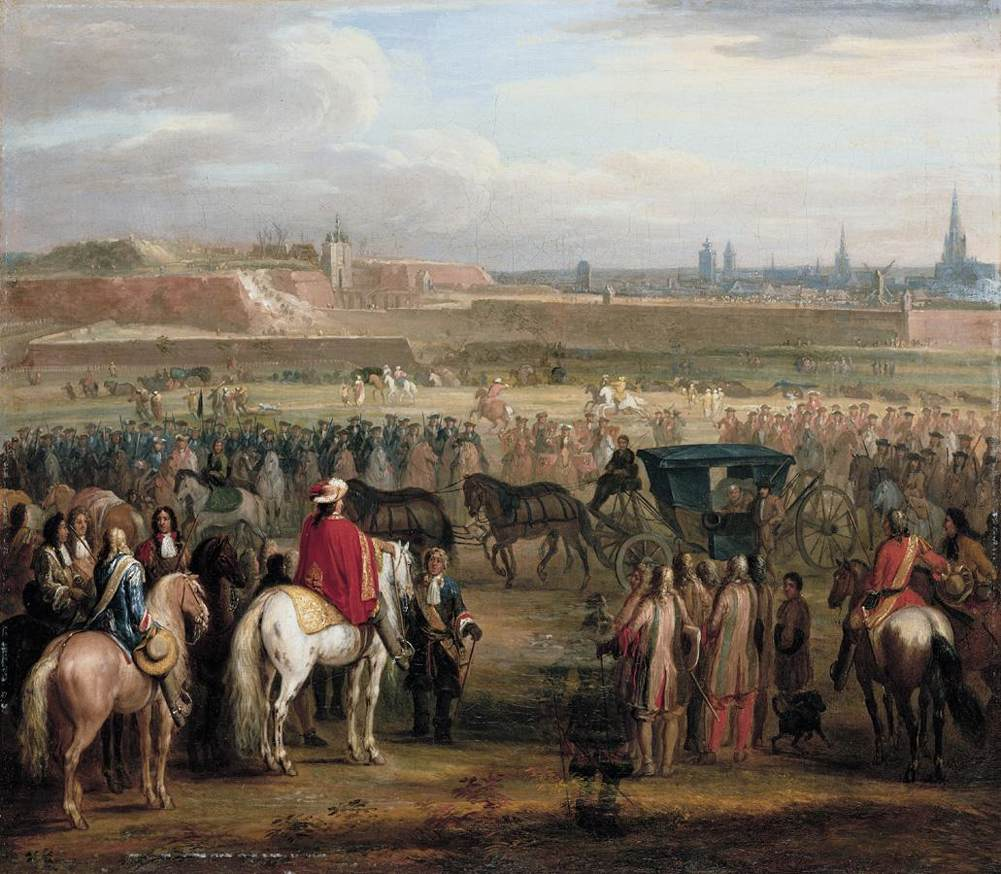
- The Surrender of Cambrai
Date	20 March – 19 April 1677
Location	Cambrai, Spanish Netherlands, modern France
Result	French victory

Belligerents
France	Spain

Commanders and leaders
(Kingdom of France) Louis XIV (Kingdom of France) Duc de Luxembourg (Kingdom of France) Vauban	(Spain) Dom Pedro de Zavala

Strength
35,000 (maximum)	3,000–4,000

Casualties and losses
800	Minimal

The siege of Cambrai took place from 20 March to 19 April 1677 during the 1672–1678 Franco-Dutch War; then part of the Spanish Netherlands, it was invested by a French army under the duc de Luxembourg. Siege operations were supervised by the military engineer Vauban; Louis XIV was nominally in command but played little part in operations.

An attempt by a combined Dutch-Spanish force under William of Orange to relieve the nearby town of Saint-Omer was defeated by Luxembourg at Cassel on 11 April. Cambrai surrendered on 19 April and was ceded to France by Spain in the September 1678 Treaty of Nijmegen.

== Background ==
Key locations in Northern France and the Spanish Netherlands; modern Belgium in dark green

In the 1667-1668 War of Devolution, France captured most of the Spanish Netherlands and the Spanish province of Franche-Comté but many of their gains were relinquished by the Treaty of Aix-la-Chapelle, agreed with the Triple Alliance of the Dutch Republic, England and Sweden. To split the Alliance, Louis XIV paid Sweden to remain neutral, while signing an alliance with England against the Dutch in the 1670 Treaty of Dover.

France invaded the Dutch Republic in May 1672 at the start of the Franco-Dutch War and initially seemed to have won an overwhelming victory. However, the Dutch position stabilised, while concern at French gains brought support from Frederick William of Brandenburg-Prussia, Emperor Leopold and Charles II of Spain. France retained the Dutch stronghold of Maastricht, but withdrew from the Netherlands in 1673, additional fronts opening in the Rhineland and the Spanish Pyrenees.

The French position weakened in early 1674, when Denmark-Norway joined the Alliance in January, followed by the February Treaty of Westminster making peace between England and the Dutch Republic. An effective Allied response in Flanders was hampered by power struggles in Madrid, while Spanish control over the Spanish Netherlands was by now largely nominal.

Although peace talks were ongoing, Louis followed his normal policy of taking the offensive, then negotiating from strength; the French used the 1676 campaign season to capture Condé-sur-l'Escaut, Bouchain, Maubeuge and Bavay. This cut off Valenciennes and Cambrai, while French cavalry prevented movement of troops and devastated areas around the towns. Marshall Schomberg, French commander in Flanders, had proposed taking Cambrai in August, but was ordered to relieve Maastricht, then under siege by the Dutch.

The plan for 1677 was to take Valenciennes, Cambrai and Saint-Omer, completing the French frontière de fer or "iron border;" Louis calculated this would leave the Dutch little reason to continue. Supply depots were assembled along the border with the Spanish Netherlands, enabling operations to begin in February, a month earlier than usual. In late February, a detachment of 12,000 moved against Saint Omer, while the main army of 35,000 under Luxembourg besieged Valenciennes.

== The siege ==
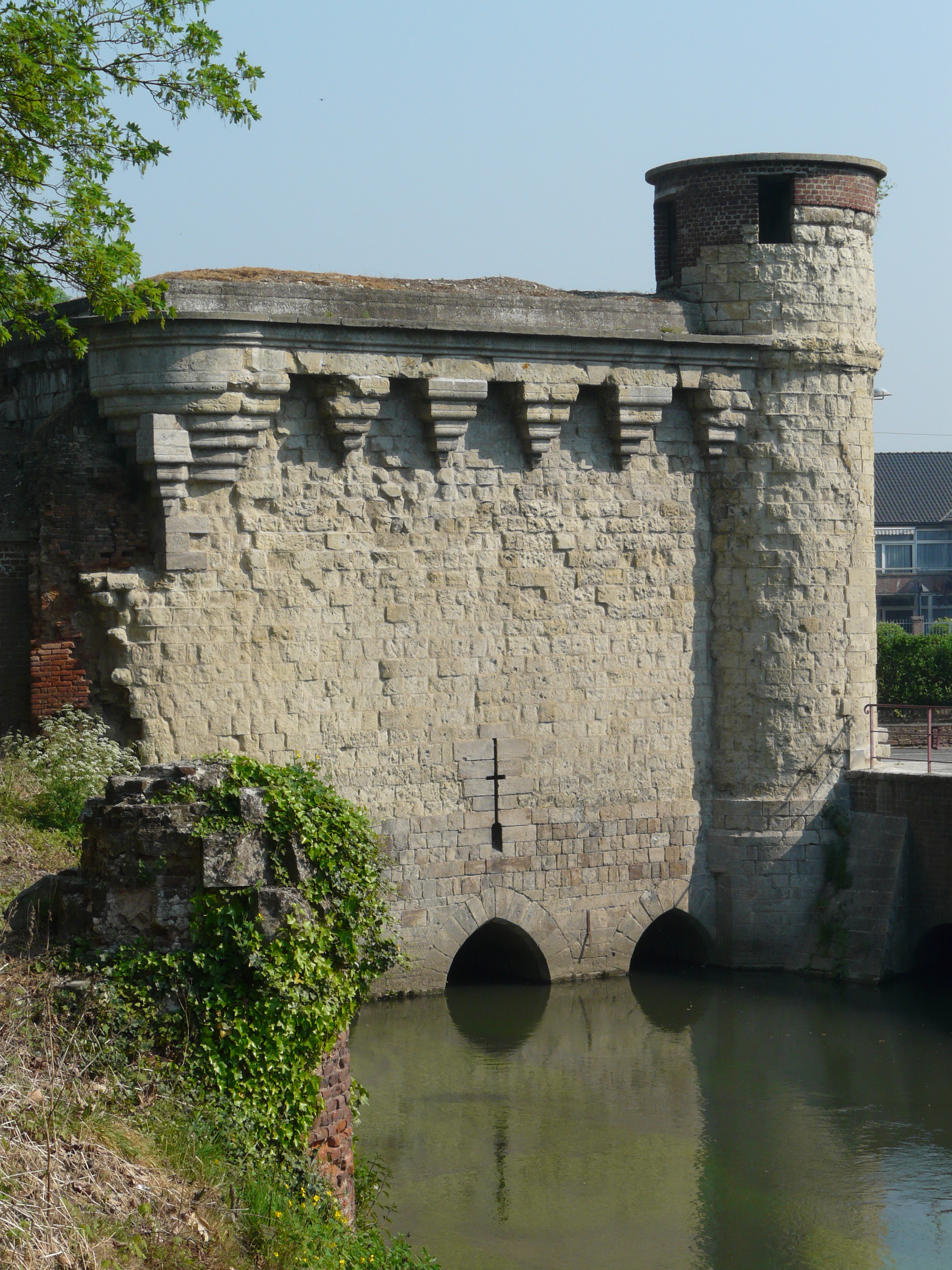
The 14th century Tower of Arquets, part of Cambrai's flood defences on the Scheldt

Attempts to take Cambrai in 1649 and 1657 both failed; the town was surrounded by marshland, the Scheldt provided flood defences, while its fortifications had been upgraded after 1543. However, these had been poorly maintained, while French intelligence reported the garrison was composed of second-line troops, 'in weak and miserable condition.' Once Valenciennes had been captured, Cambrai would be left isolated behind French lines (see Map).

Over the winter of 1676/1677, the French blockaded the garrison; on 4 December 1676, Louis signed an order forbidding the sale of grain or forage to Cambrai, with large fines for any village found to have done so. The Comte de Montal, French governor of Charleroi, was ordered to stop supplies or personnel from Namur reaching the garrison. Spanish officers disguised themselves as peasants; a French commander was reprimanded for allowing one to enter Cambrai in late January.

Once Valenciennes surrendered on 17 March, Luxembourg moved against Cambrai. On 22 March, 7,000 locally conscripted peasants began digging lines of circumvallation and contravallation and on 30 March, French siege artillery commenced bombardment of the walls. By 3 April, the breach was large enough to assault and they quickly captured the Selles and Notre Dame gates; the city surrendered on 5 April, although the Citadel still held out.

By now, William of Orange had assembled a Dutch-Spanish army of 30,000 men. While he could not save Cambrai, he was determined to fight for Saint Omer. The Allies reached Mont-Cassel on 9 April, 15 kilometres west of Saint-Omer; leaving minimal forces at St Omer and Cambrai, Luxembourg's combined force defeated them at Cassel on 11 April and William was forced to retreat.

This meant the surrender of Cambrai was only a matter of time but against Vauban's advice, the outworks were unsuccessfully assaulted by French infantry on 10 April, leading to over 500 fatalities, including one of his nephews. It is suggested this was instigated by senior officers who wanted to gain credit for capturing the town. On 19 April, De Zavala capitulated and along with 2,000 others was given free passage to the nearest Spanish territory.

== Aftermath ==
Three days later, Saint Omer also surrendered, completing French objectives in Flanders. Talks at Nijmegen were given a greater sense of urgency in November after William's marriage to his cousin Mary, niece of Charles II of England. An Anglo-Dutch defensive alliance was signed in March 1678, although English troops did not arrive in significant numbers until late May; Louis used this opportunity to capture Ypres and Ghent in early March, before signing a peace treaty with the Dutch on 10 August.

Although the Dutch signed the Treaties of Nijmegen on 10 August 1678, a joint Spanish-Dutch army fought at Saint-Denis on 13th. Having secured Mons, Spain made peace on 19 September, ceding Saint-Omer, Cassel, Aire, Ypres, Cambrai, Valenciennes and Maubeuge to France. Ypres was later returned but this fixed France's northern frontier close to where it remains today.

== Sources ==
- Davenport, Frances Gardiner (1917). European Treaties bearing on the History of the United States and its Dependencies.
- De Larrey, M (1721). Histoire de France sous le règne de Louis XIV, Volume 4. Michel Bohm, Rotterdam.;
- De Périni, Hardÿ (1896). Batailles françaises, Volume V. Ernest Flammarion, Paris.;
- Desvoyes, Léon-Paul (1872). "Genealogie de la famille Le Prestre de Vauban". Bulletin de la Société des Sciences historiques et naturelles de Semur.
- Lynn, John (1996). The Wars of Louis XIV, 1667–1714 (Modern Wars In Perspective). Longman. ISBN 978-0582056299.;
- Nolan, Cathal J (2008). Wars of the age of Louis XIV, 1650–1715. ABC-CLIO. ISBN 978-0-313-33046-9.;
- Satterfield, George (2003). Princes, Posts and Partisans: The Army of Louis XIV and Partisan Warfare in the Netherlands (1673-–1678). Brill. ISBN 978-9004131767.;
- Smith, Rhea (1965). Spain; A Modern History. University of Michigan Press. ISBN 978-0472071500.;
- Van Nimwegen, Olaf (2010). The Dutch Army and the Military Revolutions, 1588–1688 (Warfare in History). Boydell Press. ISBN 978-1843835752.
