= Esquerchin =

- Commune
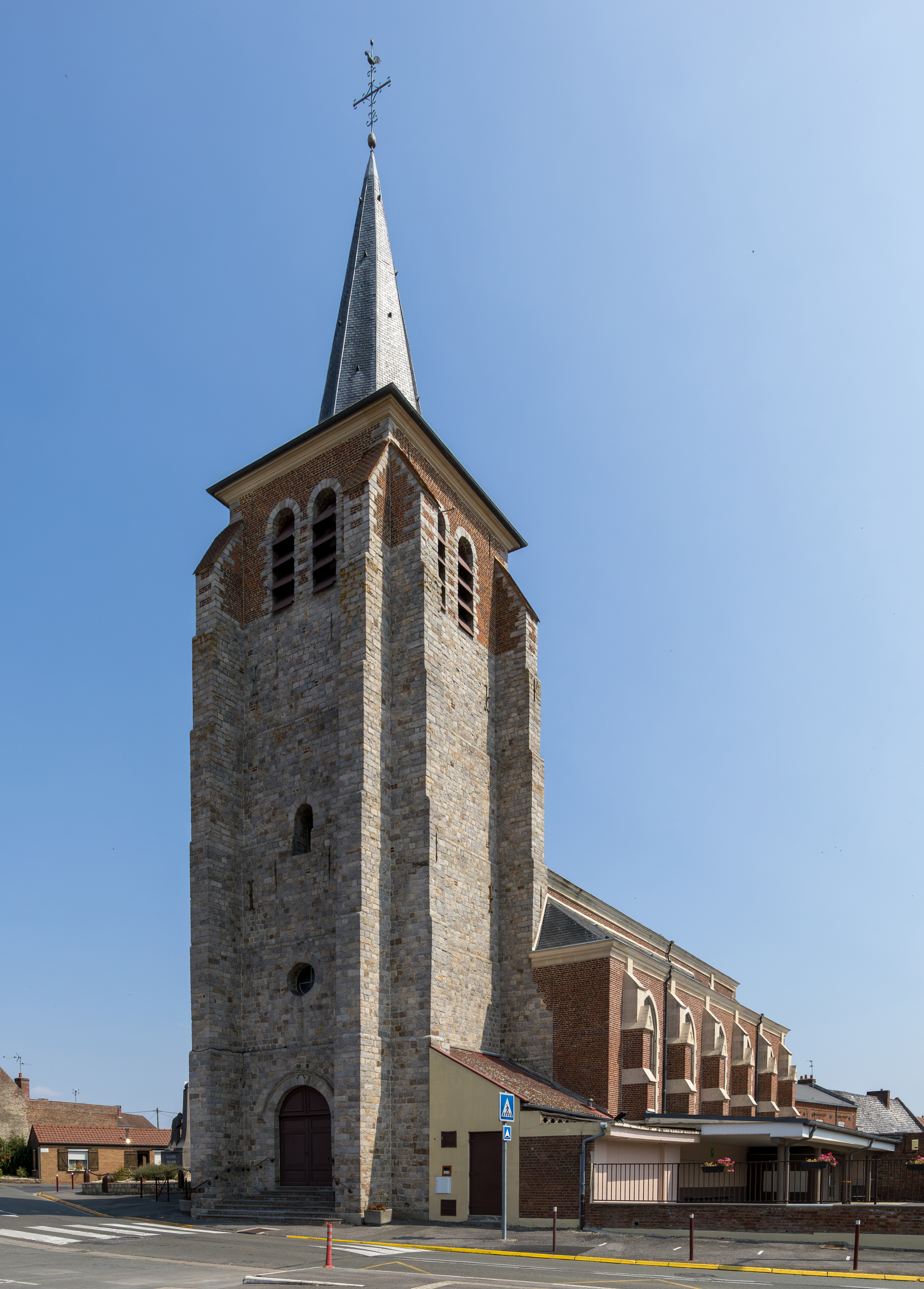
- The church in Esquerchin

- Coat of arms
- Location of Esquerchin
- Location within France Location within Hauts-de-France
- Coordinates: 50°22′34″N 3°00′50″E
- Country: France
- Region: Hauts-de-France
- Department: Nord
- Arrondissement: Douai
- Canton: Douai
- Intercommunality: Douaisis Agglo

Government
  - Mayor (2020–2026): Thierry Boury
- Area^{1}: 5.34 km^{2} (2.06 sq mi)
- Elevation: 32 m (105 ft)
- Highest elevation: 50 m (160 ft)
- Lowest elevation: 25 m (82 ft)
- Population (2023): 893
  - Density: 167/km^{2} (433/sq mi)
- Time zone: UTC+01:00 (CET)
  - Summer (DST): UTC+02:00 (CEST)
- INSEE/Postal code: 59211 /59553
- ^{1} French Land Register data, which excludes lakes, ponds, glaciers > 1 km^{2} (0.386 sq mi or 247 acres) and river estuaries.

Esquerchin (French pronunciation: [ekɛʁʃɛ̃]) is a commune in the Nord department in northern France.

== Heraldry ==
Arms of Esquerchin	The arms of Esquerchin are blazoned : Bendy gules and vair, a bendlet sinister sable.

== See also ==
- Communes of the Nord department
