= Canton of Douai =

Coordinates: 50.37°N 3.08°E

The canton of Douai is an administrative division of the Nord department, northern France. It was created at the French canton reorganisation which came into effect in March 2015. Its seat is in Douai.

It consists of the following communes:

1. Courchelettes
2. Cuincy
3. Douai
4. Esquerchin
5. Flers-en-Escrebieux
6. Lambres-lez-Douai
7. Lauwin-Planque
