= Douai Mountain =

Mountain in the country of Canada

- Location within Alberta Location within British Columbia Location within Canada

Highest point
- Elevation: 3,120 m (10,240 ft)
- Prominence: 21 m (69 ft)
- Parent peak: Mount Alexandra (3388 m)
- Listing: Mountains of Alberta; Mountains of British Columbia
- Coordinates: 51°58′37″N 117°11′23″W

Geography
- Country: Canada
- Provinces: Alberta and British Columbia
- Protected area: Banff National Park
- Parent range: Park Ranges
- Topo map: NTS 82N14 Rostrum Peak

Climbing
- First ascent: 1951 S.B. Hendricks, E. Cammack, D. Hubbard, J. Smith, A. Wexler

Douai Mountain is a mountain on the border of Alberta and British Columbia, named in 1918 after Douai, a village in France liberated by Canadians and allies in World War I.

== See also ==
- List of peaks on the British Columbia–Alberta border
- List of mountains in the Canadian Rockies
