= Kartouwe =

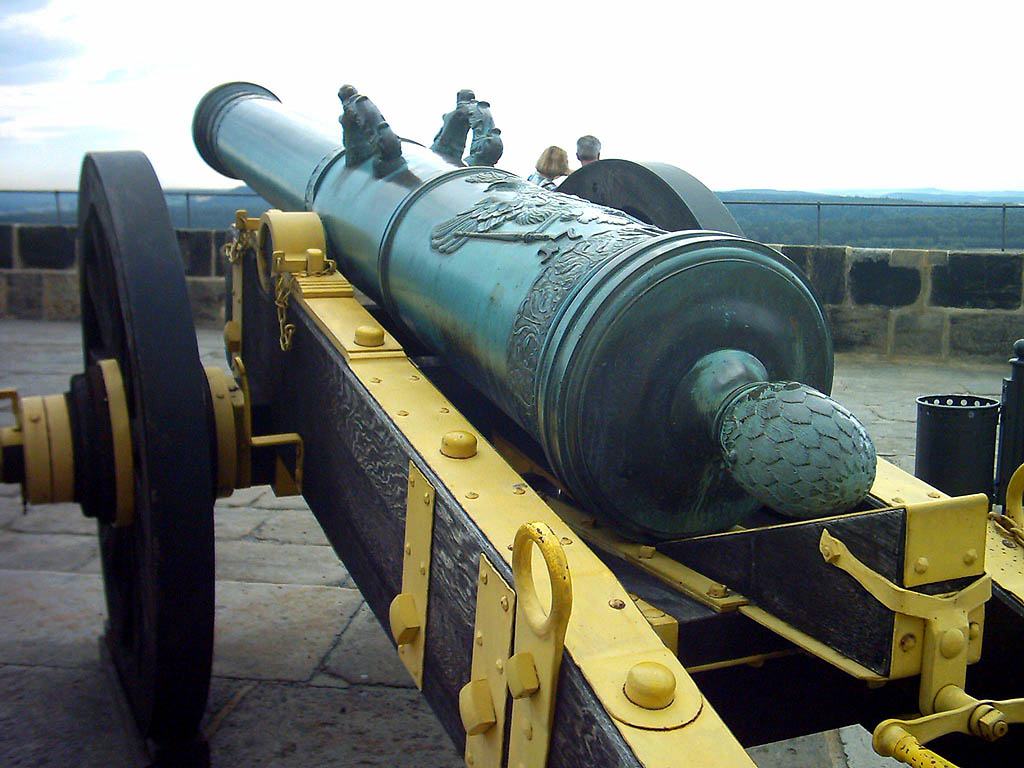
Kartouwe exhibit in Königstein Fortress (Germany)

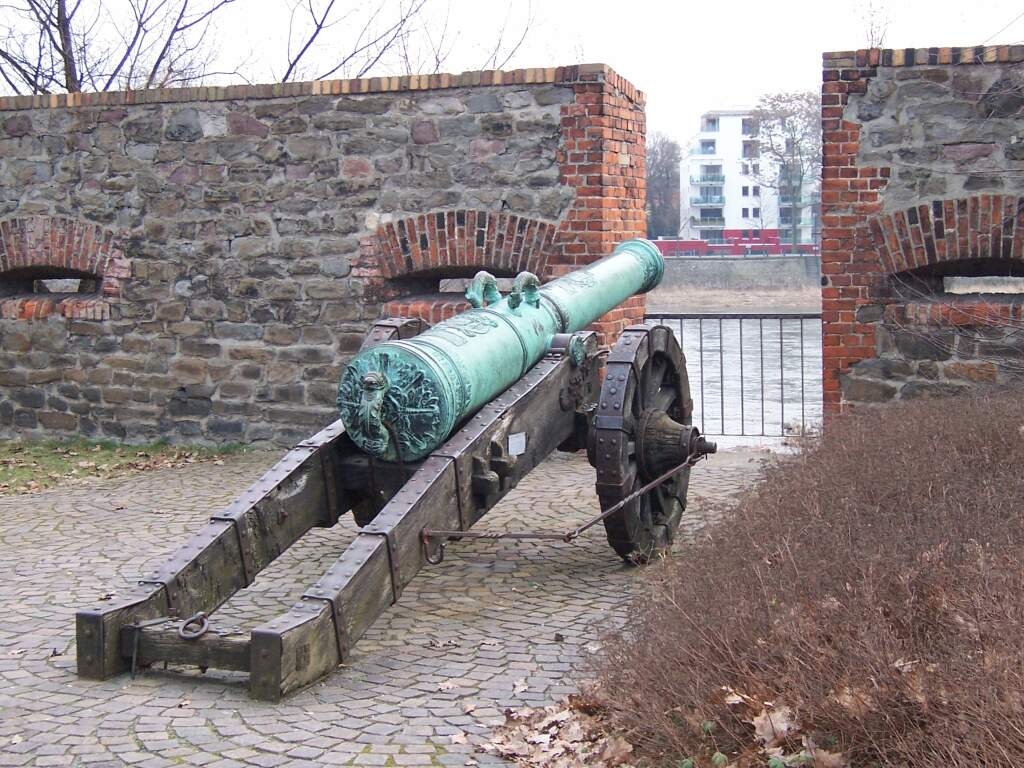
Half-kartouwe exhibit in Magdeburg (Germany)

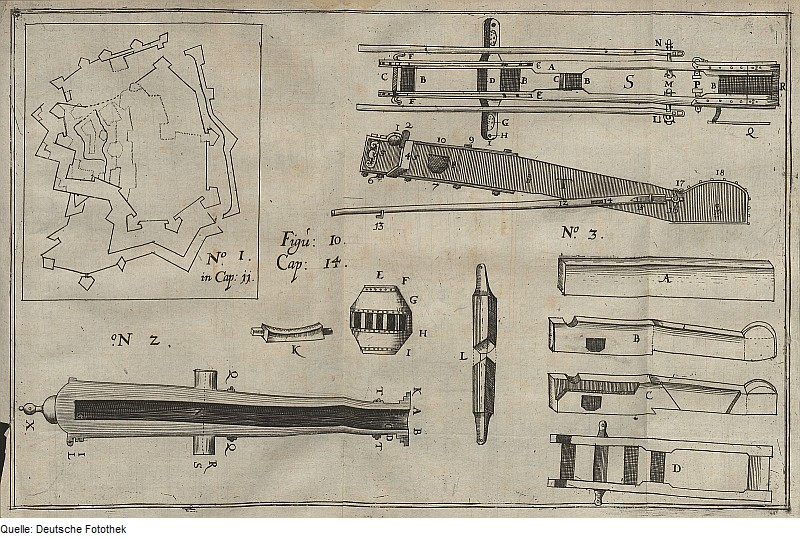
The fortifications of Ostend (Fig. 1) and the parts of a kartouwe (Figs. 2 and 3) in a 1616 print

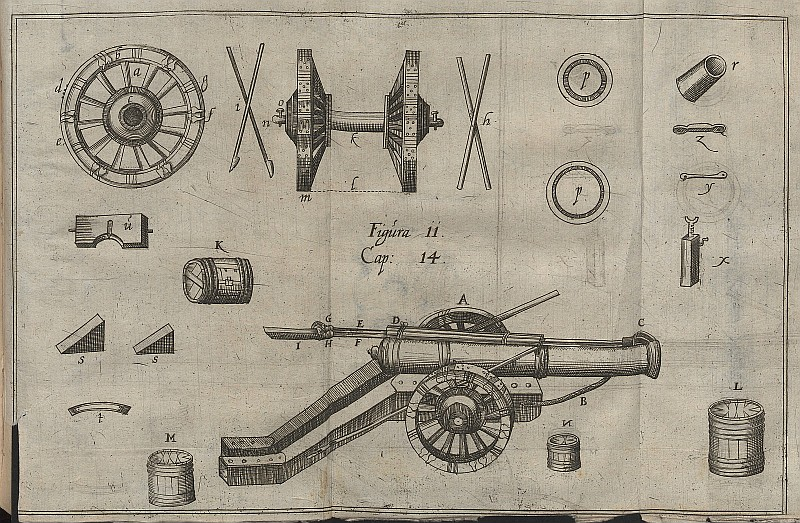
Kartouwe and accessories

Engravings from Johann Jacobi von Wallhausen, Manuale militare (1616)

A kartouwe (plural: kartouwen) is a siege gun used in European warfare during the 16th and 17th centuries. The name kartouwe is of Dutch origin, a corruption of Latin quartana (quarter cannon). In the Holy Roman Empire the gun was called Kartaune in German or cartouwe in contemporary Latin usage, in the Swedish Empire Kartow, spelling variants include kartouw, kartouve, cartow, cartaun, courtaun, and others.

== Characteristics ==
Kartouwen were developed from bombards. A kartouwe has a caliber of 8 inches (200 mm), weighs about 8,000 pounds (3,600 kg), and is designed to fire cannonballs weighing up to 52 pounds (24 kg). As a minimum, twenty horses or oxen were needed to move a kartouwe.

In addition to "whole" ("hele") kartouwen, there were also double, half ("halve") and quarter kartouwen. The barrel of a whole kartouwe has a length of 18 to 19 times the caliber, weighs 3,000 kilograms (6,600 lb) to 3,500 kilograms (7,700 lb) and was transported on a special wagon by 20 to 24 horses, another four to eight horses were needed to transport the mount (lafette). The barrel length of a half-kartouwe is 32 to 34 times the caliber, which ranges between 105 millimetres (4.1 in) and 115 millimetres (4.5 in). Its barrel weighs 1,100 kilograms (2,400 lb) to 1,500 kilograms (3,300 lb), the whole gun 1,700 kilograms (3,700 lb) to 2,400 kilograms (5,300 lb). Half-kartouwen fired cannonballs weighing between 8 pounds (3.6 kg) and 10 pounds (4.5 kg), and for the transport of its barrel, 10 to 16 horses were needed.

The huge size of the cannon and the weight of its 48-pound projectiles (standard value, though real projectiles could vary from 30 to 60 pounds) made it onerous to maneuver and reload. William P. Guthrie estimates that a single kartouwe averaged only 8 to 10 shots under sustained combat conditions, half to a third as much as the more common 3 to 6-pounder field guns, though in all cases "well-drilled troops could shave these times."

== Use and perception ==
Kartouwen were used for example in the Livonian War by the Russian and Swedish forces. During the Battle of Narva (1581), the besieging Swedish forces destroyed the walls of Narva, 5.5 metres (18 ft) strong, within two days using twenty-four double and half-kartouwen.

Kartouwen were also the characteristic of the Thirty Years' War. As such, they were featured in contemporary poems, e.g. in Am liebsten bey der Liebsten by Sibylla Schwarz ("grausame Kartaune", "gruesome kartouwe") and Tränen des Vaterlandes, anno 1636 by Andreas Gryphius ("donnernde Karthaun'", "thundering kartouwe"). In his 1844 poem Die Tendenz, Heinrich Heine used kartouwen to symbolize loudness.

== Sources ==
=== Bibliography ===
- Hartung, Harald (1995). Gedichte und Interpretationen. Vom Naturalismus bis zur Jahrhundertmitte. Reclam Universal-Bibliothek (in German). Vol. 7894. Reclam. ISBN 3-15-007894-6.
- Kasekamp, Andreas (1990). "Characteristics of warfare in the times of Henry of Livonia and Balthasar Russow". Lituanus. 36 (1). ISSN 0024-5089. Archived from the original on 14 May 2011.
- Llewellyn, E.C. "The Influence of Low Dutch on the English Vocabulary. Oxford University Press, London 1936". De Digitale Bibliotheek voor de Nederlandse Letteren.
- Medick, Hans; Winnige, Norbert. "Begriffsregister zum Selbstzeugnis des Hans Krafft" (in German). Thüringer Universitäts- und Landesbibliothek Jena.
- Peterson, Gary Dean (2007). Warrior kings of Sweden. The rise of an empire in the sixteenth and seventeenth centuries. McFarland. ISBN 978-0-7864-2873-1.
- Sørensen, Bengt Algot; Arndal, Steffen (2002). Geschichte der deutschen Literatur (in German). Vol. 2 (2 ed.). C.H.Beck. ISBN 3-406-47589-2.
- "Meyers Großes Konversations-Lexikon, Band 10. Leipzig 1907, S. 682" (in German). zeno.org.
- "Brockhaus' Kleines Konversations-Lexikon, fünfte Auflage, Band 1. Leipzig 1911, S. 943" (in German). zeno.org.
- "Adelung, Grammatisch-kritisches Wörterbuch der Hochdeutschen Mundart, Band 2. Leipzig 1796, S. 1506" (in German). zeno.org.
