= Frontière de fer =

Series of French fortifications built by Louis XIV

- France, and present day Belgium
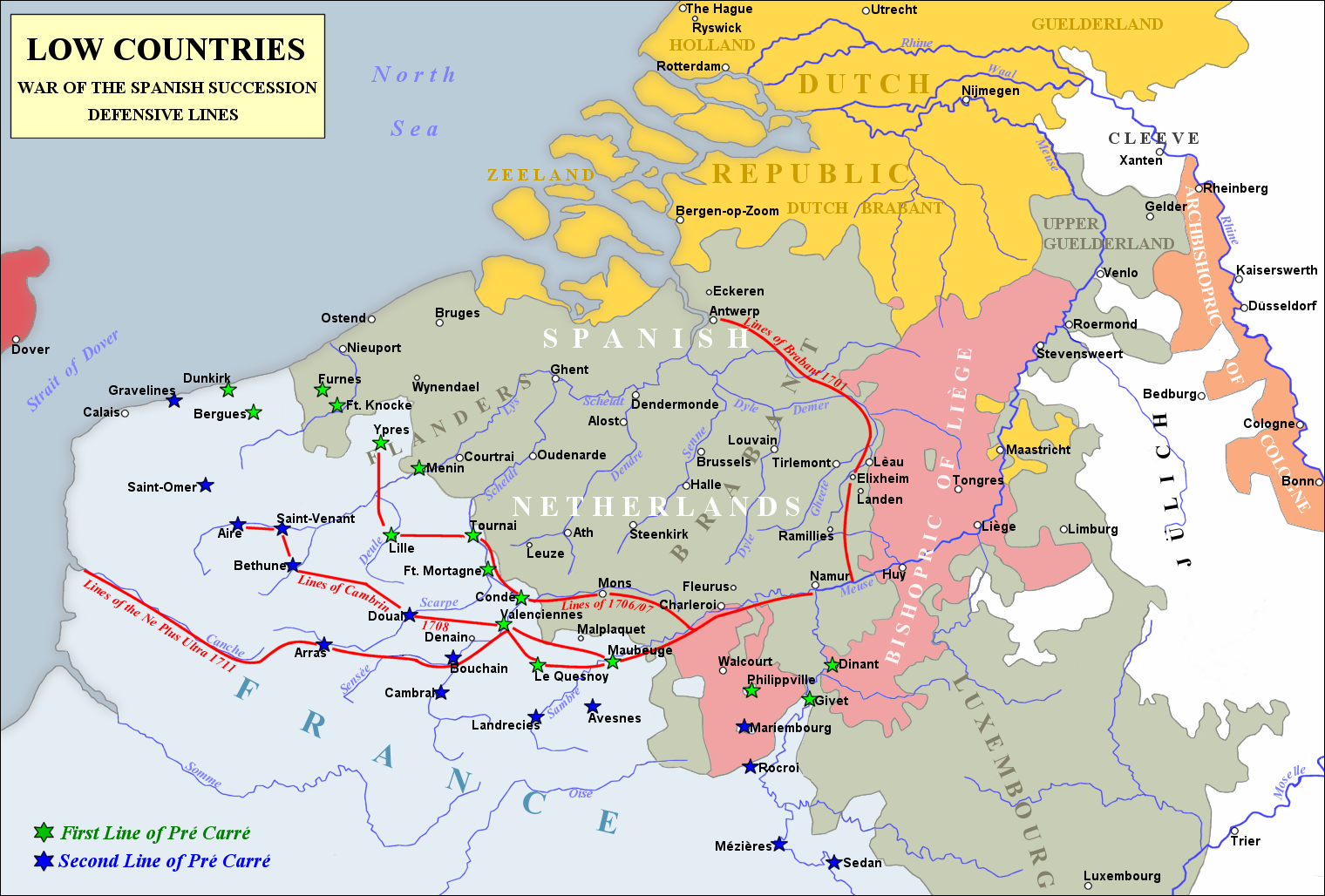
- The frontière de fer or pré carré as it was envisioned by Vauban

Site information
- Type: Defensive lines

Site history
- Built: Late 17th century/early 18th century
- Battles/wars: Nine Years' War; War of the Spanish Succession

Frontière de fer or pré carré is the name given in military historiography to the double line of fortresses that king Louis XIV had constructed after the Peace of Nijmegen in 1678 to protect what was then Northern France against foreign invasion, and to be used as operational bases against foreign enemies in the years of the Nine Years' War and the War of the Spanish Succession. This system of defensive lines was later extended to a so-called Ceinture de fer (Iron Belt) that also encompassed similar systems along the eastern and southern borders of France. The alternative term pré carré may be based on a misunderstanding. The term pré carré was first used by the French military engineer Sébastien Le Prestre de Vauban in a letter to the French minister of war François Michel Le Tellier de Louvois of January 1643 in which he wrote:

Seriously, Monseigneur, the king should think a little about making his "own garden" (pré carré). This confusion of friendly and enemy places does not please me. You are forced to maintain three for one. Your people are tormented by it, your expenses greatly increased and your forces greatly diminished, and I add that it is almost impossible for you to be able to put them all in order and equip them. I say further that if, in the disputes which we have so often with our neighbours, we should come to play a little misfortune, or (God forbid) fall into a minority, most of them would go away like they came. That is why, either by treaty or by a good war, Monseigneur, always preach the square, not of the circle, but of the garden. It's a beautiful and good thing to be able to keep one's fate in one's own hands. (Note: Sérieusement, Monseigneur, le roi devrait un peu songer à faire son pré carré. Cette confusion de places amies et ennemies ne me plaît point. Vous êtes obligé d'en entretenir trois pour une. Vos peuples en sont tourmentés, vos dépenses de beaucoup augmentées et vos forces de beaucoup diminuées, et j'ajoute qu'il est presque impossible que vous les puissiez toutes mettre en état et les munir. Je dis de plus que si, dans les démêlés que nous avons si souvent avec nos voisins, nous venions à jouer un peu de malheur, ou (ce que Dieu ne veuille) à tomber dans une minorité, la plupart s'en iraient comme elles sont venues. C'est pourquoi, soit par traité ou par une bonne guerre, Monseigneur, prêchez toujours la quadrature, non pas du cercle, mais du pré. C'est une belle et bonne chose que de pouvoir tenir son fait des deux mains.)

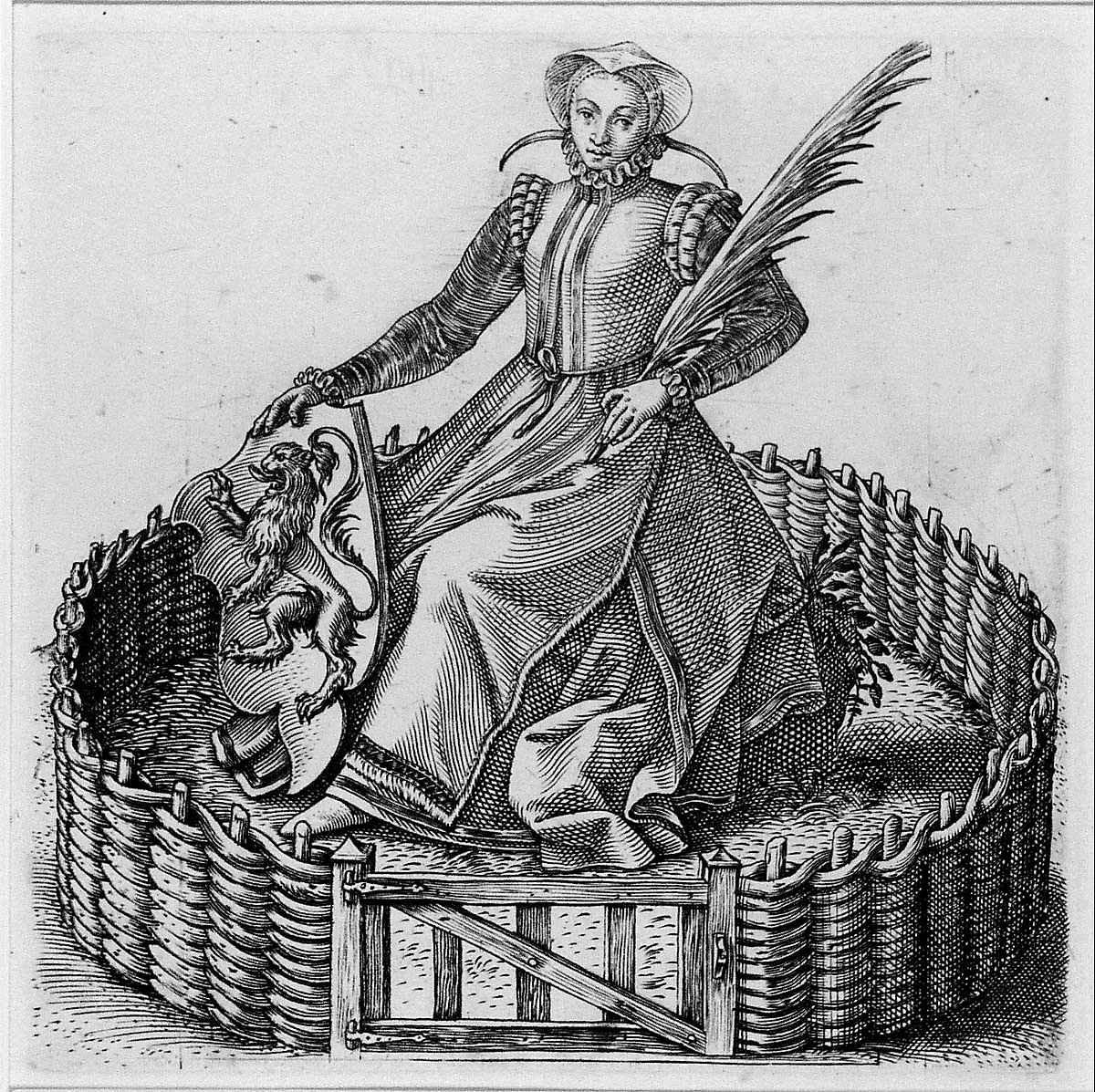
Example of a "garden of Holland" emblem that may illustrate Vauban's pré carré idea

In this quote Vauban not only introduced the term pré carré that can be variously translated, depending on the context, (Note: Vauban, who at this time had just returned from the Dutch Republic he had helped invade in the previous year in the opening stage of the Franco-Dutch War, where he may have encountered the Dutch iconographic construct of the Hollandse Tuin (Garden of Holland), a garden enclosed by a wall, or palisade. (In modern Dutch the word tuin means "garden", but at the time the word meant the enclosure around the garden). What Vauban apparently referred to in his quote was such an enclosed garden.) but more importantly, for the first time formulated the strategic vision that would later be the basis for the frontière de fer as a military architecture. He may have been inspired by the so-called Oud-Hollands vestingstelsel (Old-Dutch system of fortresses (Note: The name has been chosen, because later in the 17th century Vauban's Dutch rival Menno van Coehoorn developed an improved version, called the "New-Dutch system of fortresses.")), a multi-tiered ring of fortresses around the core of the Dutch Republic, that had been constructed since 1629 in the last stage of the Eighty Years' War, and that culminated in the Dutch Waterline that frustrated the final push of the French offensive in late 1672.

Vauban envisioned (like in the Dutch example) a tiered set-up, like in a contemporary order of battle. To attain this objective he suggested to Louvois not just which enemy fortresses to take and retain, but also which ones to bypass, and which eventually to discard (after demolishing them). His strategic ideal thus guided him both in the conduct of offensive war and in the peacetime construction of new fortified locations. He intended his barriers not as flexible defenses, but as "...seals designed to preserve the sacred land of France. The pré carré demanded the rationalization of French frontiers, not just the building of ever more fortifications. Vauban often spoke of abandoning and razing existing fortifications, as well as building new ones."

The term frontière de fer was apparently coined by Lazare Carnot in a later stage. Officially the system was referred to as the règlement des places frontières (regulation for the border places).; the other designations were given by later historians. Though Vauban can claim to be the originator of the concept, others (primarily Louvois, and possibly the king himself) decided the final shape the system would take over many years. However, Vauban was the architect of many, if not all, of the fortresses that would become part of the system. According to the principles he developed in his Mémoire, pour servir d'instruction dans la conduite des sièges et dans la défense des places (1670) and worked out in many later such mémoires, he sought to adapt each individual design to the characteristics of the local landscapes, taking advantage of local features, where possible. As Commissaire general des fortifications he was in charge of the actual construction of the system after 1677 and until his death in 1707. He therefore did not see the system in its final form, which it briefly achieved after 1708, before it was broken up again in the immediately following years.

The system spanned the area between the sea at Dunkirk to Dinant at the border of the Prince-Bishopric of Liège, a neutral state at the time. It is a landscape that is relatively open to maneuver warfare, even though many rivers run through it. This unlike the area to the East, which is far more difficult to maneuver in, and so forms a natural border. Hence the need to form a non-natural defensive barrier in it. Vauban aimed at forming in the center of the plain a strong center from which the army could resist the invading enemy from the front and threaten him on his flanks if he tried to bypass that position, and from which the army could take the offensive also. To construct such a position Vauban sought to take advantage of natural obstacles, like rivers, canals and military inundations. It consisted of a "first" or "northern" line of fortified places, centered on Mons, Condé and Tournai, with in front of that the fortress of Ath. Behind this first line in the center, a second line was envisaged, consisting of Douai, Arras, Valenciennes, Bouchain, Cambrai, Maubeuge, Landrecies, and Le Quesnoy. To the right of this central sector we find Namur, Charleroi, Philippeville, Mariembourg, Avesnes, Rocroi, and Charlemont. On the Western part of the line we find Nieuwpoort, Fort Knokke, Ypres, and Menen.

The system was developed while wars were going on in the area in question. Consequently, the places mentioned above often changed hands. In 1701, when the War of the Spanish Succession started, France possessed all of them, but in the course of the war more and more were lost to the opponents of France in that War. After the Peace of Utrecht a number of these places were permanently removed from the French sphere of influence, and ironically a number of those places became part of the Barrier created by the Barrier treaties that were intended to defend the Dutch Republic against French encroachment after 1715. Knokke, Ypres, Menen, Tournai, Mons and Namur so became part of the defensive line of fortresses that protected France's enemies.

== Sources ==
- Bély, L. (2015). Dictionnaire Louis XIV (in French). Robert Laffont.
- Duffy, C. (2015). The Fortress in the Age of Vauban and Frederick the Great 1660-1789. Routledge. ISBN 978-1-317-40859-8.
- Marga, A.A. (1880). Géographi Militaire. Première partie. Généralités et la France. Texte (in French). Vol. 1 (3 ed.). Fontainebleau: Ernest Bourges.
- Murray, W. (1996). The Making of Strategy: Rulers, States, and War. Cambridge University Press. ISBN 978-0-521-56627-8.
- Nimwegen, O. van (2020). De Veertigjarige Oorlog 1672–1712 (in Dutch). Prometheus. ISBN 978-90-446-3871-4.
- Pujo, B. (2012). Vauban (in French). Albin Michel. ISBN 978-2-226-23580-0.
