= Siege of Ypres (1678) =

1678 during the Franco-Dutch War

Coordinates: 50.8500°N 2.8830°E

- Part of the Franco-Dutch War
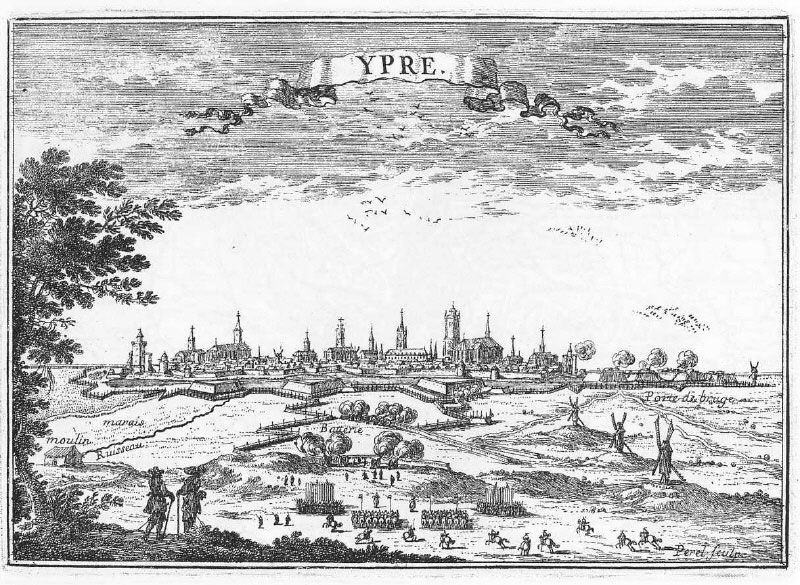
Date	March 18, 1678 – March 25, 1678
Location	Ypres, Spanish Netherlands (present-day Belgium)
Result	French victory

Belligerents
France	United Provinces; Spain

Commanders and leaders
(Kingdom of France) Louis XIV (Kingdom of France) Vauban	(Spanish Empire) Dom Francisco de Pardo

Strength
Unknown	Unknown

Casualties and losses
Unknown	Unknown number of casualties 2,200 surrendered

The siege of Ypres in the Spanish Netherlands took place between March 18 and March 25, 1678, as part of the Franco-Dutch War, and ended with the conquest of the city by the French.

== Prelude ==
In October 1677, Mary Stuart, niece and possible successor of Charles II of England, married William III of Orange, concluding the rapprochement between England and the Dutch Republic, who had been at war with each other until 1674. Louis XIV decided to invade the Spanish Netherlands to counter a possible English military intervention against him.

The Dutch expected an attack against Namur. But Louis XIV directed his troops towards Ghent, taking the city on March 9, and then turned immediately west in the direction of Ypres.

== Siege ==
On March 18, the French, led by Vauban, started digging approach trenches towards the citadel. The city was defended by a Spanish garrison under Dom Francisco de Pardo, who ordered the surroundings of the city flooded. But the French had already advanced too much to be stopped by this action. The city was pounded by 22 high caliber guns and 12 mortars. After one week, the works had advanced so far, that Louis XIV ordered an attack in the night of March 24–25. The city was quickly conquered and the defenders capitulated by dawn. Only the citadel held out for one more day, after which the surviving 1600 valid men and 600 wounded also surrendered.

== Consequences ==
In April, Vauban started reconstructing and modernising Ypres' fortifications, giving it the form that can still be seen today. Louis de Crevant, Duke of Humières became governor of the city.
In England, Charles II raised some 20 regiments to be shipped to Ostend, but then hesitated to go to war with France. In the meantime, negotiations started between France and the Dutch Republic, leading to the Treaty of Nijmegen on August 10.

== Sources ==
- Abel Hugo, France historique et monumentale : Histoire générale de France depuis les temps les plus reculés jusqu'à nos jours, 1843.
- Camille Rousset, Histoire de Louvois et de son administration politique et militaire, Volume 2, 1862.
- Luc-Normand Tellier, Face aux Colbert : les Le Tellier, Vauban, Turgot-- et l'avènement du libéralisme, Édition presse de l'université de Quebec, 1987.
