= Armorial of the Communes of Oise (A–C) =

This page lists the armoury (emblazons=graphics and blazons=heraldic descriptions; or coats of arms) of the communes from A-C in Oise (department 60), which is split due to its length.

Other pages:

- Armorial of the Communes of Oise (A–C)
- Armorial of the Communes of Oise (D–H)
- Armorial of the Communes of Oise (I–P)
- Armorial of the Communes of Oise (Q–Z)

== A ==
Image	Name of Commune	French original blazon	English blazon
	Abancourt	De gueules à la jumelle ondée en bande d'argent, accompagnée, en chef, d'une couronne de laurier d'or, au franc-quartier d'azur chargé de trois fleurs de lys aussi d'or.	Gules, 2 bends wavy argent, in chief a laurel crown Or, and on a canton azure, 3 fleurs-de-lys Or.
	Abbecourt	d'argent à la fasce de gueules accompagnée de six merlettes de sable trois en chef et trois en pointe.	Argent, a fess gules between 6 marlets sable.
	Les Ageux		
	Agnetz	Ecartelé au premier d’azur à trois fleurs de lys d’or, au deuxième de gueules à la bande d’argent côtoyée de deux cotices du même, au troisième de gueules à la merlette d’or, au franc quartier d’argent un poignard renversé de gueules posé en bande, au quatrième d’azur aux trois châteaux donjonnés d'or maçonnés de sable.	Quarterly, 1: Azure, 3 fleurs-de-lys Or; 2: Gules, a bend coticed argent; 3: Gules, a martlet Or and on a canton argent a dagger inverted bendwise gules; 4: Azure, 3 triple-towered castles Or.
	Amblainville	De sinople à la croix de gueules bordée d'argent, cantonnée en pointe à dextre d'une gerbe de blé liée de sable et à senetre d'un heaume du même taré de demi-profil, à l'écu d'azur bordé d'argent brochant en coeur chargé d'une tour d'or terrassée de même, au chef de gueules chargé de trois besans d'argent et soutenu d'une devise d'or.	Vert, a cross gules fimbriated argent between, in base, a garb Or, tied sable, and a helm in demi-profile Or, overall on an inescutcheon azure fimbriated argent a tower issuant from a base Or; and on a chief gules fimbriated Or, 3 plates [argent].
	Andeville	d'azur à la bande d'argent remplie de gueules, chargée d'un éventail, accosté de deux boutons percés de quatre trous, le tout du second; accompagné en chef d'une gerbe de blé d'or et en pointe de trois couverts du second, en pals mis en bande. Ecu surmonté de la croix de guerre 1939 - 1945.	Azure, on a bend argent voided gules between a garb [of wheat] Or and knife, fork and spoon palewise argent, a fan between 2 4-holed buttons argent. (atop the shield, a 'croix de guerre 1939-1945')
	Ansauvillers	Parti : au premier de gueules, à la fasce d'or accompagnée de sept merlettes d'argent, quatre en chef rangées en fasce et trois en pointe bien ordonnées; au second de gueules, à six anneaux posés 3, 2 et 1, le second de la première rangée chargé en coeur d'un besant du même.	Gules, a fess Or between 7 marlets [4,2,1] argent. impaled with Gules, 6 annulets Or, the top centre one with a bezant [Or] inside.
	Ansacq	d'azur chargé de fleurs de lys d'or.	Azure, semy de lys Or. = France Ancient (Ansacq, Brillon, Escaudain, Escautpont, Hélesmes, Hérin, Lecelles, Lieu-Saint-Amand, Lourches, Neuville-sur-Escaut, Rosult, Rumegies and Wignehies use the same arms.)
	Anserville	d'azur au chevon d'or accompagné de trois coquilles d'argent.	Azure, a chevron Or between 3 escallops argent.
	Apremont	de gueules au pal d'argent.	Gules, a pale argent. (Beauvais and Apremont use the same arms.)
	Arsy	d'or aux trois maillets de sinople à la barre de gueules brochant sur le tout.	Or, 3 mallets vert, overall a bend sinister gules.
	Attichy	De gueules aux trois haches d’armes d’argent, celle de senestre et celle de pointe contournées, au chef cousu écartelé d’azur à une abeilles d’argent posée en fasce et de gueules plain	Gules, 3 pole-axes the sinister one and that in base contourny argent, and a chief quarterly 1: azure, a bee and 2: Gules.
	Autrêches	Ecartelé au premier et quatrième de gueules à la bande d’or, au deuxième et au troisième parti d’argent à la fasce de gueules et de vair plain.	Quarterly 1&4: gules, a bend Or; and 2&3: per pale a:argent a fess gules and b: vair simple.
	Avrechy	de gueules à la bande ondée d'argent accompagnée de deux gerbes de blé d'or, au chef d'azur semé de fleurs de lys d'or.	Gules, a bend wavy argent between 2 garbs [of wheat] Or, and a chief azure semy de lys Or.
	Avricourt	d'or à un sautoir d'azur, cantonné de 4 merlettes de gueules	Or, a saltire azure between 4 martlets gules.
	Avrigny	D’argent à une quintefeuille de sinople accompanée de neuf merlettes du même posées en orle	Argent, a cinqfoil between 9 martlets in orle vert.

== B ==
Image	Name of Commune	French original blazon	English blazon
	Bailleval	De sinople à la palissade d’or, chaussé d’azur, au chevronnel renversé ondé aussi d’or brochant sur le trait de chaussé.	Vert, a picket fence Or, chaussé wavy azure, a chevronel inverted wavy Or on the line of division. (French palissade can be a picket fence or a palisade)
	Balagny-sur-Thérain	de gueules à la bande ondée d'argent accompagnée, en chef, d'une croisette pattée de huit pointes d'or et, en pointe, d'un fer de moulin du même, à l'écusson d'azur aux trois merlettes d'argent brochant en abîme sur le tout.	Gules, a bend wavy argent between a crosslet patty and a millrind Or, overall on an inescutcheon azure, 3 martlets argent.
	Baron	d'or au chevron de gueules, accompagné en chef de deux coquilles et en pointe d'un sanglier, le tout de sable.	Or, a chevron gules between 2 escallops and a boar sable.
	Beaumont-les-Nonains	taillé : au premier d'azur aux trois bandes d'or, au second d'azur semé de fleurs de lys d'or; à la barre d'argent brochant sur la partition.	Per bend sinister 1: azure, 3 bends Or; 2: azure semy de lys Or; overall a bend sinister argent on the line of division.
	Beaurepaire	d'azur aux trois bandes d'or.	Azure, 3 bends Or.
	Beauvais	de gueules au pal d'argent.	Gules, a pale argent. (Beauvais and Apremont use the same arms.)
	Berneuil-sur-Aisne	D’azur à la jumelle ondée d’argent, chaque fasce côtoyée de deux trangles ondées du même, accompagnée, en chef à dextre d’une fleur de lys, à senestre d’un lion et en pointe d’un épervier essorant, le tout d’or.	Azure, 2 fesses wavy each coticed argent, between a fleur-de-lys, lion and a kestrel rising Or.
	Béthisy-Saint-Pierre	d'azur fretté d'or chargé au flanc de deux fleurs de lys du champ, à un chateau d'argent marconné de sable brochant sur le tout, au chef aussi d'argent chargé de trois fleurs de lys du champ.	Azure fretty Or, a castle argent masoned sable between 2 fleurs de lys azure, and on a chief argent, 3 fleurs de lys azure.
	Betz	Parti :au premier de gueules à six fleurs de lys d’or (ordonnées 3.2.1); au second de sinople à cinq épis de blé d’or ordonnés 3 et 2; à une divise ondée d’argent brochant en pointe sur le tout, le tout sommé d’un chef fuselé d’argent et de gueules.	Per pale 1: Gules, 6 fleurs de lys Or; 2: Vert, 5 stalks of wheat Or (3,2); overall in base a barrulet wavy argent; and a chief fusilly argent and gules.
	Blaincourt-lès-Précy	d'argent, à la bordure d'azur et à l'ecusson de gueules aux huit merlettes de sable ordonnées en orle.	Argent, on an inescutcheon gules 8 martlets in orle sable, all within a bordure azure.
	Boissy-le-Bois	d'azur au lion d'or.	Azure, a lion Or.
	Boran-sur-Oise	Losangé de gueules et d'argent; au chef d'or chargé d'un écusson de sable à dextre et de l'inscription « BORAN » en lettres capitales du même à senestre.	Lozengy gules and argent, on a chief Or an inescutcheon and the inscription BORAN in capital letters sable.
	Bornel	écartelé : au premier de sinople à la gerbe de blé d'or, au deuxième d'azur à la fleur de lys d'argent, au troisième d'azur au léopard d'argent, au quatrième de sinople à la roue dentée de six pièces d'or; à la croix d'argent remplie de gueules brochant sur l'écartelé.	Quarterly 1: vert, a garb [of wheat] Or; 2: Azure, a fleur-de-lys argent; 3: azure, a leopard argent; 4: vert, a 6-spoked toothed wheel Or; overall a cross argent voided gules on the line of division. or Quarterly vert and azure, a cross gules fimbriated argent between a garb Or, a fleur-de-lys, a leopard argent, and a 6-spoked toothed wheel Or.
	Bouconvillers	d’azur au chevron abaissé et arqué d’or, accompagné à dextre d’une croisette ancrée du même et à senestre d’une étoile d’argent, surmonté de deux lions affrontés celui de dextre aussi d’or et celui de senestre aussi d’argent, soutenant un croissant du même.	Azure, a chevron ployé abasssed Or, and in chief 2 lions respectant (dexter one Or, sinister argent) maintaining a crescent argent, and a crosslet moline Or and a mullet argent.
	Boulogne-la-Grasse	D'azur à trois tours d'argent ouvertes de sable.	Azure, 3 towers argent pierced sable.
	Boutencourt	D'azur à la croix engêlée à la bordure de même.	Azure, a cross engrailed within a bordure argent.
	Brenouille	De sinople à la fasce d'argent.	Vert, a fess argent.
	Bresles	Échiqueté d'or et d'azur.	Chequy Or and azure. (the family Durat, the counts of Vermandois and the communes Donges, Bresles, Dreux, Ribemont, Fenouillet, Mouxy use the same arms.)
	Breteuil	d'or à la croix de gueules cantonnée de seize abeilles renversées d'azur ordonnées 2 et 2 dans chaque canton, au franc-canton aussi d'or chargé d'une étoile aussi de gueules. (Croix de guerre 1914–1918)	Or, a cross gules between 16 bees inverted azure (2 and 2 in each quarter), and on a canton Or, a mullet of 5 gules. (NB: the canton covers 4 bees).
	Brétigny	d'or aux cinq chateaux de gueules ouverts, maconnés et ajourés de sable ordonnés 2.2.1.	Or, 5 castles gules, open, masoned and pierced sable.
	Breuil-le-Sec	tiercé en pal : au premier de gueules à l'engrenage de deux roues d'argent rangées en bande, la roue de dextre plus grosse que la senestre, au deuxième d'or à l'arbre au naturel, au troisième de sinople à l'épi de blé d'or posé en barre; le tout sommé d'un chef d'azur chargé de deux cigognes volantes contournées au naturel posées en fasce et rangées en bande, celle de dextre plus petite que celle de senestre.	Tierced per pale 1: Gules, 2 meshed gears in bend argent, the dexter one larger; 2: Or, a tree proper; 3: Vert, a stalk of wheat bendwise sinister Or; and on a chief azure, in bend 2 storks volant contourny fesswise proper, the dexter one smaller.
	Breuil-le-Vert	Ecartelé au premier papelonné d’argent entre-semé de trèfles renversés du même, au franc quartier de sable; au deuxième d’azur au sautoir d’argent cantonnée de quatre merlettes d’or; au troisième à cinq tours de sable ordonnées 2.2.1; au quatrième d’argent diapré de gueules à la bordure d’azur.	Quartered 1: Gules papelonny argent, semy of trefoils inverted argent (one per scale), a canton sable; 2: Azure, a saltire argent between 4 martlets Or; 3: Or, 5 towers sable; 4: Gules diapered argent, a border azure.
	Bulles	d'or à une bande d'azur.	Or, a bend azure.
	Bury	taillé : au premier d'azur aux trois bandes d'or, au second d'azur semé de fleurs de lys d'or; à la barre d'argent brochant sur la partition bordé d'or.	Per bend sinister 1: azure, 3 bends Or; 2: azure semy de lys Or; overall a bend sinister argent; and the whole shield fimbriated Or.
	Bussy	De gueules à la fasce denchée d’argent, au nuage du même mouvant de la pointe, à l’arc d’or cordé de sable brochant en pal sur le tout, au chef échiqueté d’azur et d’or de deux tires	Gules, a fess indented, and cloud issuant from base argent, overall a bow palewise Or, strung sable, and a chief chequy azure and Or of 2 traits.

== C ==
Image	Name of Commune	French original blazon	English blazon
	Cambronne-lès-Ribécourt	coupé : au premier d'azur au lion naissant d'or, au second de gueules à la fasce cousue de sable, au huchet contourné d'or brochant sur la fasce.	Per fess 1: Azure, a lion issuant from the line of division Or; 2: Gules, a fess sable, overall a hunting horn Or.
	Chambly	De gueules à trois coquilles d'argent.	Gules, 3 escallops argent.
	Chambors	de sable au sautoir d'or.	Sable, a saltire Or.
	Chantilly	d'azur au cor de chasse d'or, au chef cousu de gueules semé d'arbres d'argent.	Azure, a hunting horn Or, on a chief gules semy of trees argent.
	La Chapelle-en-Serval	d'azur au chevron accompagné au chef de deux étoiles et en pointe d'une canette contournée, le tout d'or.	Azure, a chevron between 2 mullets [of 5] and a duck contourny Or.
	Chaumont-en-Vexin	d'argent au mont cousu de gueules surmonté d'un soleil d'or.	Argent, a mount gules and a sun Or.
	Chevrières	d'azur à la croix cousue de gueules cantonnée en chef de deux fleurs de lis d'or, à l'écusson d'argent chargé d'un lion de sinople armé de gueules.	Azure, a cross gules between in chief 2 fleurs-de-lys Or, overall on an inescutcheon argent a lion vert armed gules.
	Chiry-Ourscamp	de gueules à la bande d'argent, au chef cousu d'azur chargé d'un ours passant d'or muselé du champ. (Croix de guerre 1914-1918)	Gules, a bend argent, on a chief azure, a bear passant Or, muzzled of the field.
	Choisy-au-Bac	d'argent au bac de gueules avec son batelier de carnation vêtu d'or et d'un pantalon aussi de gueules, voguant sur une champagne ondée d'azur, surmonté de trois fleurs de lys aussi d'or rangées en chef.	Argent, a flatboat gules with its boatman proper, vested Or, with pants gules, on a base wavy azure, and in chief 3 fleurs-de-lys Or.
	Cires-lès-Mello	d'or au chevron de gueules, accompagnée au chef de deux fers à cheval de sable et en pointe un alérion du même, au chef d'azur chargé de trois merlettes d'or.	Or, a chevron gules, between 2 horseshoes and an alerion sable, and on a chief azure, 3 martlets Or.
	Clairoix	D’azur au chevron vivré renversé d'argent, accompagné en chef d'une épée posée en pal surmontée d’une couronne et accosté de deux fleurs de lys le tout d’or; et deux coquilles du même en pointe (au chef d’or chargé du nom de la commune en lettres capitales de sable).	
	Clermont	De gueules à une tour d'or, ouverte, ajourée et maçonnée de sable; au chef cousu d'azur chargé de trois fleurs de lys d'or.	Gules, a tower Or, open, pierced and masoned sable, and on a chief azure, 3 fleurs-de-lys Or.
	Compiègne	d'argent au lion d'azur armé et lampassé de gueules, semé de fleurs de lys d'or et couronné du même.	Argent, a lion azure, armed and langued gules, semy de lys crowned Or.
	Corbeil-Cerf	de sable au cerf couché d'argent regardant, au chef aussi de sable chargé du nom CORBEIL-CERF en lettres capitales aussi d'argent.	Sable, a stag couchant reguardant argent, on a chief sable the name "CORBEIL-CERF" in capital letters argent.
	Cormeilles	d'azur au chateau de gueules, ajouré et coulissé d'or, maconné de sable.	Azure, a castle gules, pierced and portcullised Or, masoned sable.
	Coudun	parti au premier de gueules à la fasce d'argent, au second d'argent fretté de douze pièces de sable.	Gules, a fess argent. impaled or dimidiated with Argent fretty sable.
	Coye-la-Forêt	Écartelé : aux 1er et 4e d'azur au lunel d'argent, aux 2e et 3e d'argent à cinq écussons d'or à deux clefs de sable passées en sautoir et rangés en croix.	Quarterly 1&4: Azure, a lunel argent; 2&3: Argent, 5 inescutcheons arranged in a cross, each Or, 2 keys in saltire sable. (a lunel is 4 crescents, horns to centre, arranged in this fashion).
	Creil	d'azur au chevron d'argent chargé de trois molettes de sable et accompagné de trois roses d'or.	Azure, on a chevron argent between 3 roses Or, 3 mullets of 6 pierced sable.
	Crépy-en-Valois	d'or au lion de sable, armé et lampassé de gueules. (Croix de guerre 1914–1918)	Or, a lion sable armed and langued gules. ('Flanders' and the communes of Thourotte, Crépy-en-Valois, Bollezeele, Feignies, Flines-lez-Raches and Wormhout use the same arms.)
	Cressonsacq	de vair au lion de gueules armé lampassée et couronnée d’or.	Vair, a lion gules armed, langued and crowned Or.
	Crèvecœur-le-Grand	De sinople à un chevron haussé, écimé et découpé d'argent, accompagné en pointe d'une gerbe d'or et d'un cœur de gueules transpercé d'une épée basse d'argent posée en barre, brochant sur la gerbe; au chef d'azur chargé d'un écusson de gueules à trois chevrons d'or, accosté de deux étoiles du même. (Croix de guerre 1914–1918)	...
	Crisolles	D'argent, à l'arc de gueule posé en barre; au renard rampant d'azur, posé en bande et brochant sur l'arc; à la bordure d'azur, chargée : en chef d'une croix pattée d'or accompagnée aux angles de deux besants d'argent; sur les flancs deux calices d'or; en pointe d'une billette couchée d'argent, accompagnée sur les flancs de deux autres besants du même.	Argent, a bow gules bendwise sinister and a fox rampant azure crossed in saltire; and on a bordure azure, the following - in chief a cross patty Or between (at the corners) 2 plates, then 2 chalices Or then 2 more plates then, in base a billet fesswise argent.
	La Croix-Saint-Ouen	d'argent à la croix d'azur chargée d'une crosse d'or et cantonnée de deux feurs de lys de sable aux canton du chef-dextre et de la pointe-senestre.	Argent, on a cross between in bend 2 fleurs-de-lys sable, a crozier Or.
	Croutoy	Ecartelé au 1) contre écartelé au I et au IV d’azur à la fleur de lys d’or, au II et III de gueules à la tour d’or coulissée, ajourée et maçonnée de sable, au 2) d’azur à la croix tréflée d’or accostée de deux crosses abbatiales affrontées du même, au 3) fascé d’argent et d’azur, les fasces d’argent chargées de six fleurs de lys de gueules ordonnées 3.2.1 au 4) de gueules à la lance de tournoi d’or au guidon d’argent chargé d’une aigle de sable, adextrée en pointe d’une fleur de lys aussi d’or.	Quarterly 1: quarterly I&IV: azure, a fleur-de-lys Or; II&III: gules, a tower Or, ?? pierced and masoned sable; 2: Azure, a cross trefly between 2 abbatial croziers respectant Or; 3: barry argent and azure, the argent bars charged with fleurs-de-lys 3,2,1; and 4: Gules, a tourney lance Or with a guidon [flag] argent charged with an eagle sable, and in dexter base a fleur-de-lys Or.
	Cuignieres	D'hermine à un écusson en abîme de gueules, chargé d'un lion d'or.	Ermine, on an inescutcheon gules, a lion Or.
	Cuise-la-Motte	d’argent à la croix engrêlé de gueules chargée de cinq coquilles d’or.	Argent, on a cross engrailed gules, 5 escallops Or.
	Cuts	D'argent à la fasce de gueules.	Argent, a fess gules. (the Béthune family and the communes of Cuts, Rosny-sur-Seine, Warneton and Noyon use the same arms.)
