= Canton of Saint-Amand-les-Eaux =

Coordinates: 50.45°N 3.43°E

The canton of Saint-Amand-les-Eaux is an administrative division of the Nord department, northern France. It was created at the French canton reorganisation which came into effect in March 2015. Its seat is in Saint-Amand-les-Eaux.

It consists of the following communes:

1. Bousignies
2. Brillon
3. Bruille-Saint-Amand
4. Château-l'Abbaye
5. Flines-lès-Mortagne
6. Hasnon
7. Hélesmes
8. Lecelles
9. Maulde
10. Millonfosse
11. Mortagne-du-Nord
12. Nivelle
13. Raismes
14. Rosult
15. Rumegies
16. Saint-Amand-les-Eaux
17. Sars-et-Rosières
18. Thun-Saint-Amand
19. Wallers
