= Bousignies =

- Commune
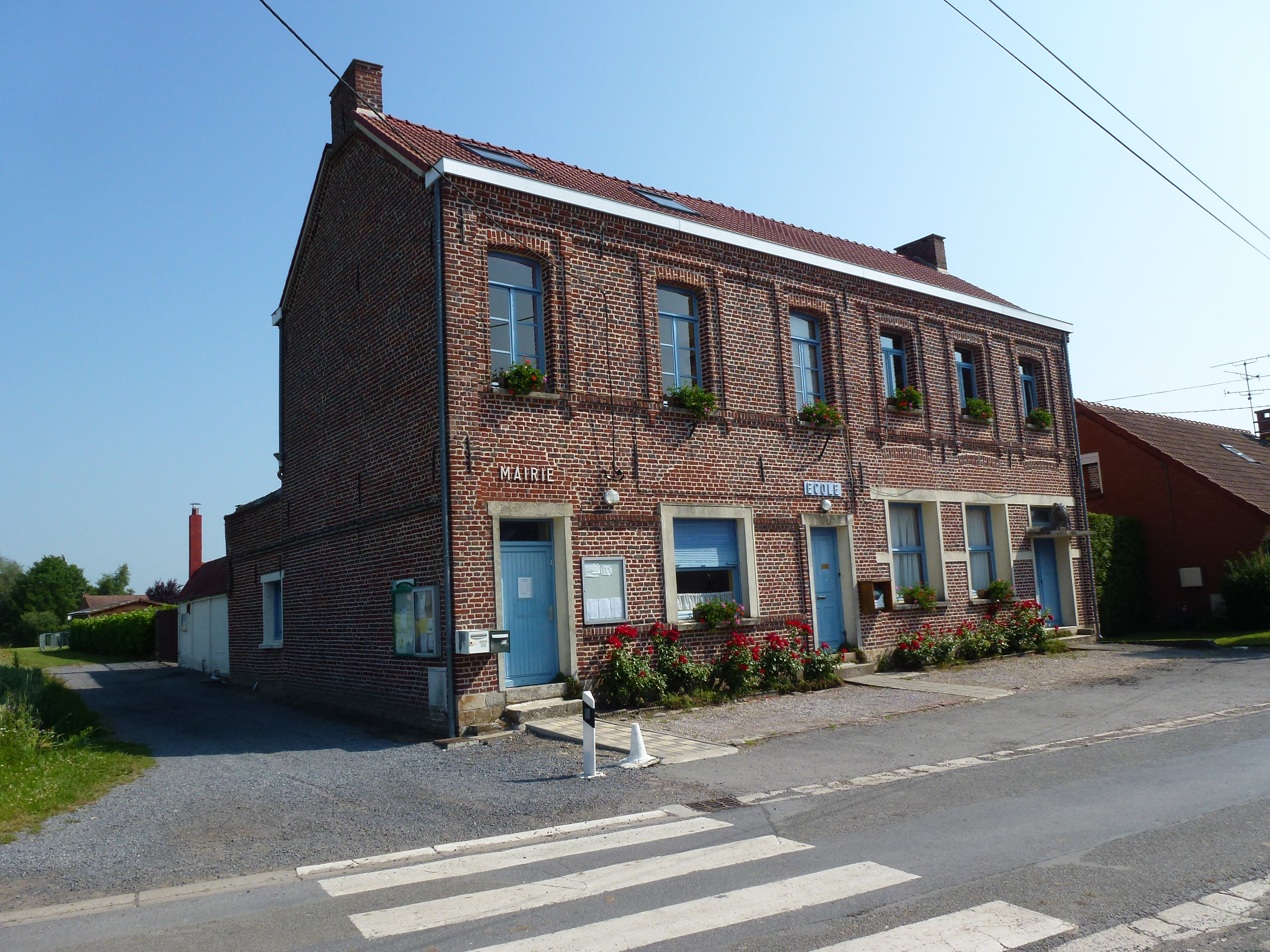
- The town hall in Bousignies
- Location of Bousignies
- Location within France Location within Hauts-de-France
- Coordinates: 50°26′08″N 3°20′56″E
- Country: France
- Region: Hauts-de-France
- Department: Nord
- Arrondissement: Valenciennes
- Canton: Saint-Amand-les-Eaux
- Intercommunality: CA Porte du Hainaut

Government
  - Mayor (2020–2026): Véronique Leroy
- Area^{1}: 3.14 km^{2} (1.21 sq mi)
- Elevation: 17 m (56 ft)
- Highest elevation: 19 m (62 ft)
- Lowest elevation: 15 m (49 ft)
- Population (2023): 339
  - Density: 108/km^{2} (280/sq mi)
- Time zone: UTC+01:00 (CET)
  - Summer (DST): UTC+02:00 (CEST)
- INSEE/Postal code: 59100 /59178
- ^{1} French Land Register data, which excludes lakes, ponds, glaciers > 1 km^{2} (0.386 sq mi or 247 acres) and river estuaries.

Bousignies (French pronunciation: [buziɲi]) is a commune in the Nord department in northern France.

== Population ==
Historical population
Year	Pop.	±% p.a.
1968	206	—
1975	182	−1.75%
1982	203	+1.57%
1990	249	+2.59%
1999	268	+0.82%
2007	308	+1.75%
2012	303	−0.33%
2017	333	+1.91%
2023	339	+0.30%
Source: INSEE

== See also ==
- Communes of the Nord department
