= Millonfosse =

- Commune
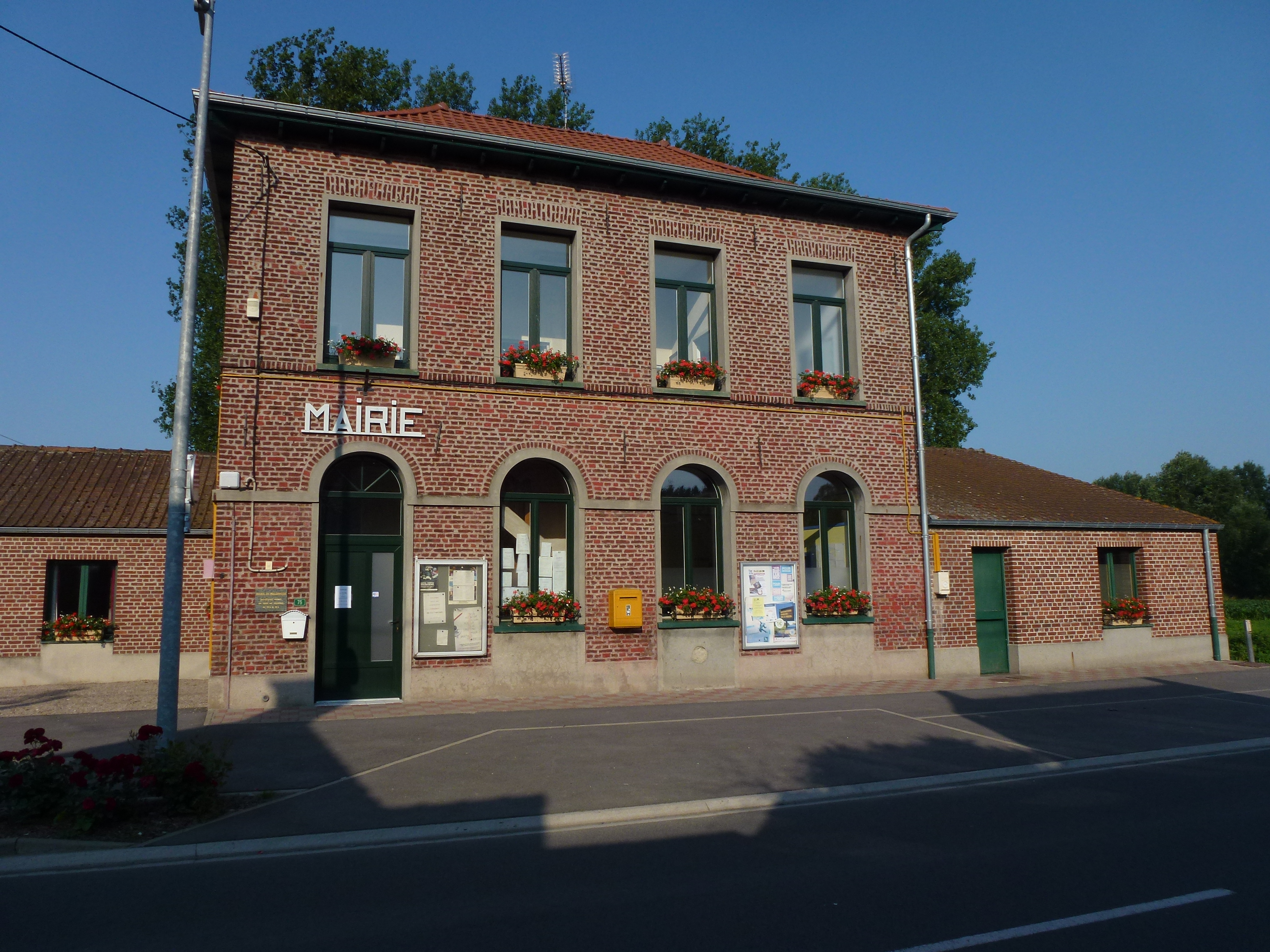
- The town hall in Millonfosse

- Coat of arms
- Location of Millonfosse
- Location within France Location within Hauts-de-France
- Coordinates: 50°26′10″N 3°23′28″E
- Country: France
- Region: Hauts-de-France
- Department: Nord
- Arrondissement: Valenciennes
- Canton: Saint-Amand-les-Eaux
- Intercommunality: CA Porte du Hainaut

Government
  - Mayor (2020–2026): Gérald Thuru
- Area^{1}: 3.48 km^{2} (1.34 sq mi)
- Elevation: 17 m (56 ft)
- Highest elevation: 20 m (66 ft)
- Lowest elevation: 14 m (46 ft)
- Population (2023): 705
  - Density: 203/km^{2} (525/sq mi)
- Time zone: UTC+01:00 (CET)
  - Summer (DST): UTC+02:00 (CEST)
- INSEE/Postal code: 59403 /59178
- ^{1} French Land Register data, which excludes lakes, ponds, glaciers > 1 km^{2} (0.386 sq mi or 247 acres) and river estuaries.

Millonfosse is a commune in the Nord department in northern France.

== See also ==
- Communes of the Nord department
