= Raismes =

- Commune
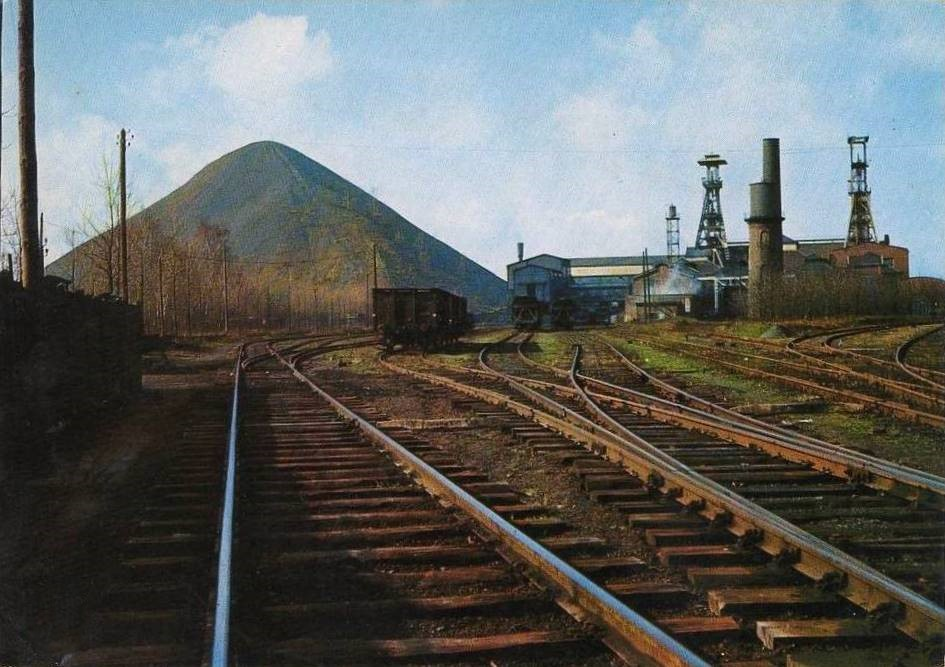
- The Sabatier mine

- Coat of arms
- Location of Raismes
- Location within France Location within Hauts-de-France
- Coordinates: 50°23′23″N 3°29′12″E
- Country: France
- Region: Hauts-de-France
- Department: Nord
- Arrondissement: Valenciennes
- Canton: Saint-Amand-les-Eaux
- Intercommunality: CA Porte du Hainaut

Government
  - Mayor (2020–2026): Aymeric Robin
- Area^{1}: 33.31 km^{2} (12.86 sq mi)
- Elevation: 28 m (92 ft)
- Highest elevation: 124 m (407 ft)
- Lowest elevation: 17 m (56 ft)
- Population (2023): 12,199
  - Density: 366.2/km^{2} (948.5/sq mi)
- Time zone: UTC+01:00 (CET)
  - Summer (DST): UTC+02:00 (CEST)
- INSEE/Postal code: 59491 /59590
- ^{1} French Land Register data, which excludes lakes, ponds, glaciers > 1 km^{2} (0.386 sq mi or 247 acres) and river estuaries.

Raismes (French pronunciation: [ʁɛm]) is a commune in the Nord department in northern France. The flutist Gaston Blanquart (1877–1962) was born in Raismes.

Raismes is known for hosting the annual rock music festival Raismes Fest.

== Population ==
Historical population
Year	Pop.	±% p.a.
1968	18,357	—
1975	16,573	−1.45%
1982	15,606	−0.86%
1990	14,099	−1.26%
1999	13,699	−0.32%
2007	13,145	−0.51%
2012	12,906	−0.37%
2017	12,587	−0.50%
2023	12,199	−0.52%
Source: INSEE

== Notable residents ==
- Pierre Pruvost (1890–1967) geologist

== See also ==
- Communes of the Nord department
