= Communauté d'agglomération de la Porte du Hainaut =

Porte du Hainaut
- Communauté d'agglomération
- Communal composition of the CAPH.

- Location within the Nord department.
- Coordinates: 50°22′N 03°23′E
- Country: France
- Region: Hauts-de-France
- Department: Nord
- No. of communes: {{{nbcomm}}}
- Established: 2014

Government
  - President (2020–2026): Aymeric Robin (PCF)
- Area: 371.4 km^{2} (143.4 sq mi)
- Population (2021): 158,568
  - Density: 426.9/km^{2} (1,106/sq mi)
- Website: www.agglo-porteduhainaut.fr

The Communauté d'agglomération de la Porte du Hainaut is an intercommunal structure in the Nord department, in the Hauts-de-France region, northern France. It was created in January 2014. The commune Émerchicourt left the communauté de communes Cœur d'Ostrevent and joined the communauté d'agglomération in January 2019. Its seat is in Wallers. Its largest towns are Denain and Saint-Amand-les-Eaux. Its area is 371.4 km^{2}. Its population was 158,568 in 2021.

== Composition ==
The communauté d'agglomération consists of the following 47 communes:

1. Abscon
2. Avesnes-le-Sec
3. Bellaing
4. Bouchain
5. Bousignies
6. Brillon
7. Bruille-Saint-Amand
8. Château-l'Abbaye
9. Denain
10. Douchy-les-Mines
11. Émerchicourt
12. Escaudain
13. Escautpont
14. Flines-lès-Mortagne
15. Hasnon
16. Haspres
17. Haulchin
18. Haveluy
19. Hélesmes
20. Hérin
21. Hordain
22. Lecelles
23. Lieu-Saint-Amand
24. Lourches
25. Marquette-en-Ostrevant
26. Mastaing
27. Maulde
28. Millonfosse
29. Mortagne-du-Nord
30. Neuville-sur-Escaut
31. Nivelle
32. Noyelles-sur-Selle
33. Oisy
34. Raismes
35. Rœulx
36. Rosult
37. Rumegies
38. Saint-Amand-les-Eaux
39. Sars-et-Rosières
40. La Sentinelle
41. Thiant
42. Thun-Saint-Amand
43. Trith-Saint-Léger
44. Wallers
45. Wasnes-au-Bac
46. Wavrechain-sous-Denain
47. Wavrechain-sous-Faulx
