= Saint-Amand-les-Eaux =

- Commune
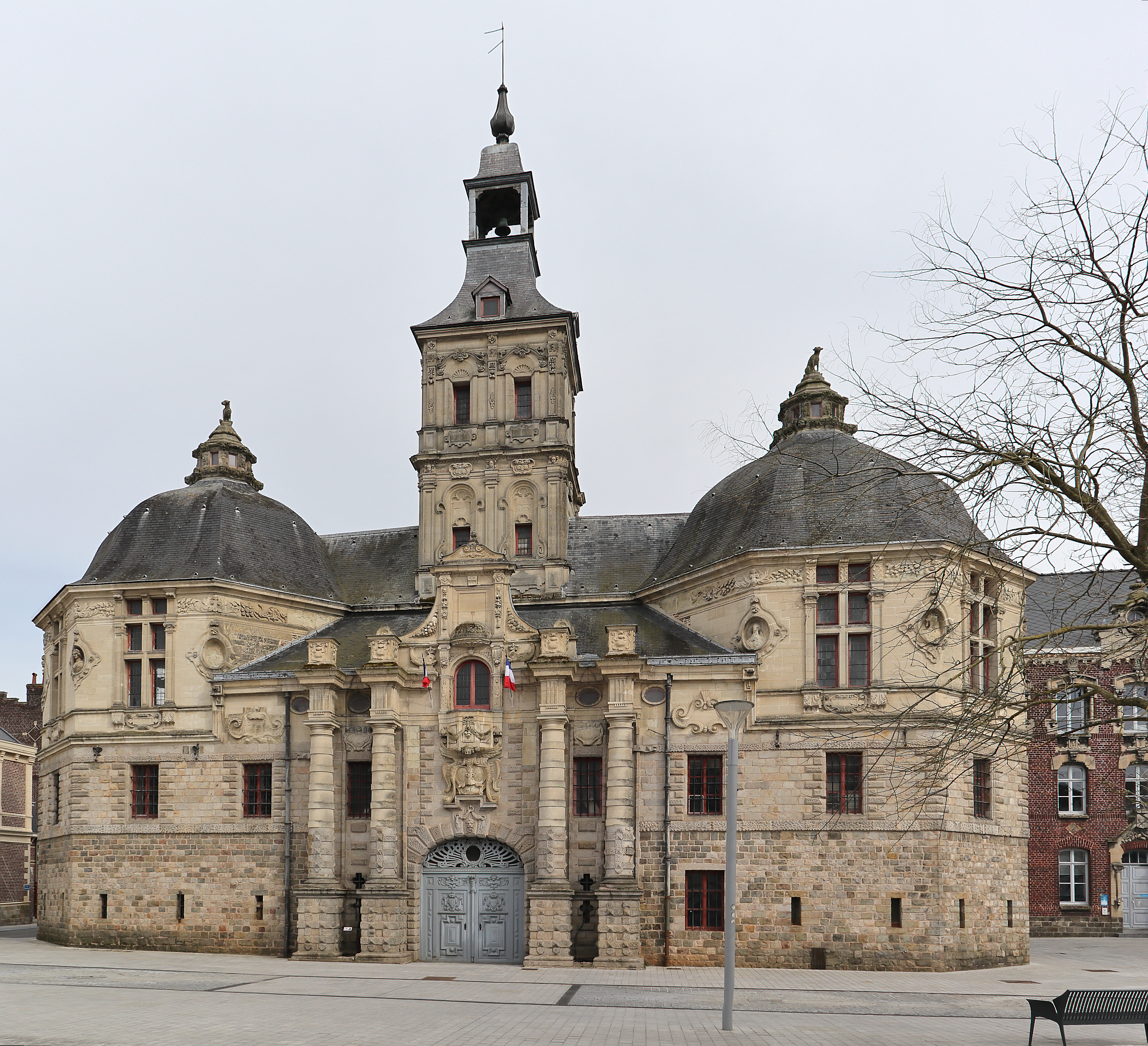
- One of the abbey buildings in Saint-Amand-les-Eaux

- Coat of arms
- Location of Saint-Amand-les-Eaux
- Location within France Location within Hauts-de-France
- Coordinates: 50°26′55″N 3°25′41″E
- Country: France
- Region: Hauts-de-France
- Department: Nord
- Arrondissement: Valenciennes
- Canton: Saint-Amand-les-Eaux
- Intercommunality: CA Porte du Hainaut

Government
  - Mayor (2025–2026): Fabien Roussel (PCF)
- Area^{1}: 33.81 km^{2} (13.05 sq mi)
- Elevation: 17 m (56 ft)
- Highest elevation: 39 m (128 ft)
- Lowest elevation: 14 m (46 ft)
- Population (2023): 15,974
  - Density: 472.5/km^{2} (1,224/sq mi)
- Demonym(s): Amandinois, Amandinoise
- Time zone: UTC+01:00 (CET)
  - Summer (DST): UTC+02:00 (CEST)
- INSEE/Postal code: 59526 /59230
- ^{1} French Land Register data, which excludes lakes, ponds, glaciers > 1 km^{2} (0.386 sq mi or 247 acres) and river estuaries.

Saint-Amand-les-Eaux (French pronunciation: [sɛ̃t‿amɑ̃ lez‿o]; former Dutch: Sint-Amands-aan-de-Skarpe, before 1962: Saint-Amand) is a commune in the Nord department, northern France. It lies on the river Scarpe, 12 km northwest of Valenciennes. In French, the town people are named Amandinois (m), Amandinoise (f).

Saint-Amand Abbey, formerly Elnon Abbey, was located here from its foundation in the 630s by Saint Amand until its dissolution in 1789.

== Population ==
Historical population
Year	Pop.	±% p.a.
1968	17,170	—
1975	16,692	−0.40%
1982	16,199	−0.43%
1990	16,776	+0.44%
1999	17,175	+0.26%
2007	16,612	−0.42%
2012	16,836	+0.27%
2017	15,889	−1.15%
2023	15,974	+0.09%
Source: INSEE

== Heraldry ==
Arms of Saint-Amand-les-Eaux	The arms of Saint-Amand-les-Eaux are blazoned: Vert, a sword argent hilted Or between 2 fleurs de lys Or.

== Local culture and heritage ==
=== Industries ===
Saint Amand has an industrial belt, casino, shopping centre, thermal baths, and several springs.

=== The Tower ===
The tower on the Grand'Place standing 82 metres tall is the symbol of this town. It is one of the remaining structures of the former Saint-Amand Abbey, and it was the west façade of the former abbey church, which has been demolished. It has a carillon with 48 bells and a museum devoted to faience. The abbey was founded in the 7th century by a friar named Amand, reconstructed in the 17th century under abbot Nicolas Dubois in a baroque style. Declared national property at the French Revolution in 1789, the abbey was destroyed in 1794. The tower is ornamented with statues, some of which were defaced in 1789. But we can see the Lothaire's statue founder of the Saint Amand school in 9th century in north face. The Saint Amand, Saint Denis, Saint Benoist and Saint Martin's statues on fifth level south face. On south face, third level, we can see the Saint Juliette and Saint Cyr's statues. On fifth level, the Hucbald 's statue which was a poet and musician, and we can see dragons symbolizing the evil spirit tamed by Saint Amand

The clock with roller and the carillon have been constructed in 1640, but the ancient abbey had many bells, too, of which the friar d'Elnon and Giselberg deplore, in a poem, the loss of 17 bells in a fire in 1066. Jehan Froissart, in this chronicles relate the siege of Saint Amand in 1340 and bells war damaged. In 1784-1785, G.L.Barbieux, one of the founders of Tournai, smelted bells down below the tour. The carillon rung the bell at half past eleven to twelve o'clock, from February 18, 1802 ( 15 pluviose, fifth year ) each day to warn the workers that lunch approaches.

=== The Echevinage ===
Named priory too, because it was touched the prior's rooms, built in 1632 during the Flemish Renaissance, was the primary entrance of the abbey. There was magistrate of the town's meeting rooms. In second level there was justice room and jails in street level. One moat, named "Madame" was facing the front door which had drawbridge and portcullis. The bell, named bancloque was called the people so that they hear the magistrate's speeches than he was screamed on his balcony at the top of the front door. Till then 1958, in the firth level, the peace justice was done. In this level there was wedding room, burned in 1949, rebuilt after. In second level there are echevinal and reception rooms, and the Watteau room where there are paintings painted by himself in 1781 and 1792.

=== Saint Martin's church ===
At the location of the current church, there was Saint Martin's Mont des Cornet, a 7th-century church, rebuilt in the 11th century in the romanesque style and again in 1783, this time in the neoclassical.

=== The old faience factories ===
Saint Amand is known for its faience, produced, in the past, by ancient faience factories that used the bianco sopra bianco technique.

- 1705 Nicolas Demoutier built a faience factory, managed by himself and by the family Dorez, descendants of Bartélémy a ceramist from Lille, in the next place. The faience factory equipment was sold to Bécart in 1775, who has been installed this firm in Valenciennes.
- 1718, the Fauquez family built their faience factory. They were natives of Tournai in Belgium. The roads, waterways and forests were favourable for transporting the products, so they set up their firm in Saint Amand. But the Treaty of Utrecht, which set the frontier between Tournai and Saint Amand forbade the transport of faience across the border. The faience was hidden in kegs and hay to cross the frontier. The Fauquez's factory was closed in 1794.
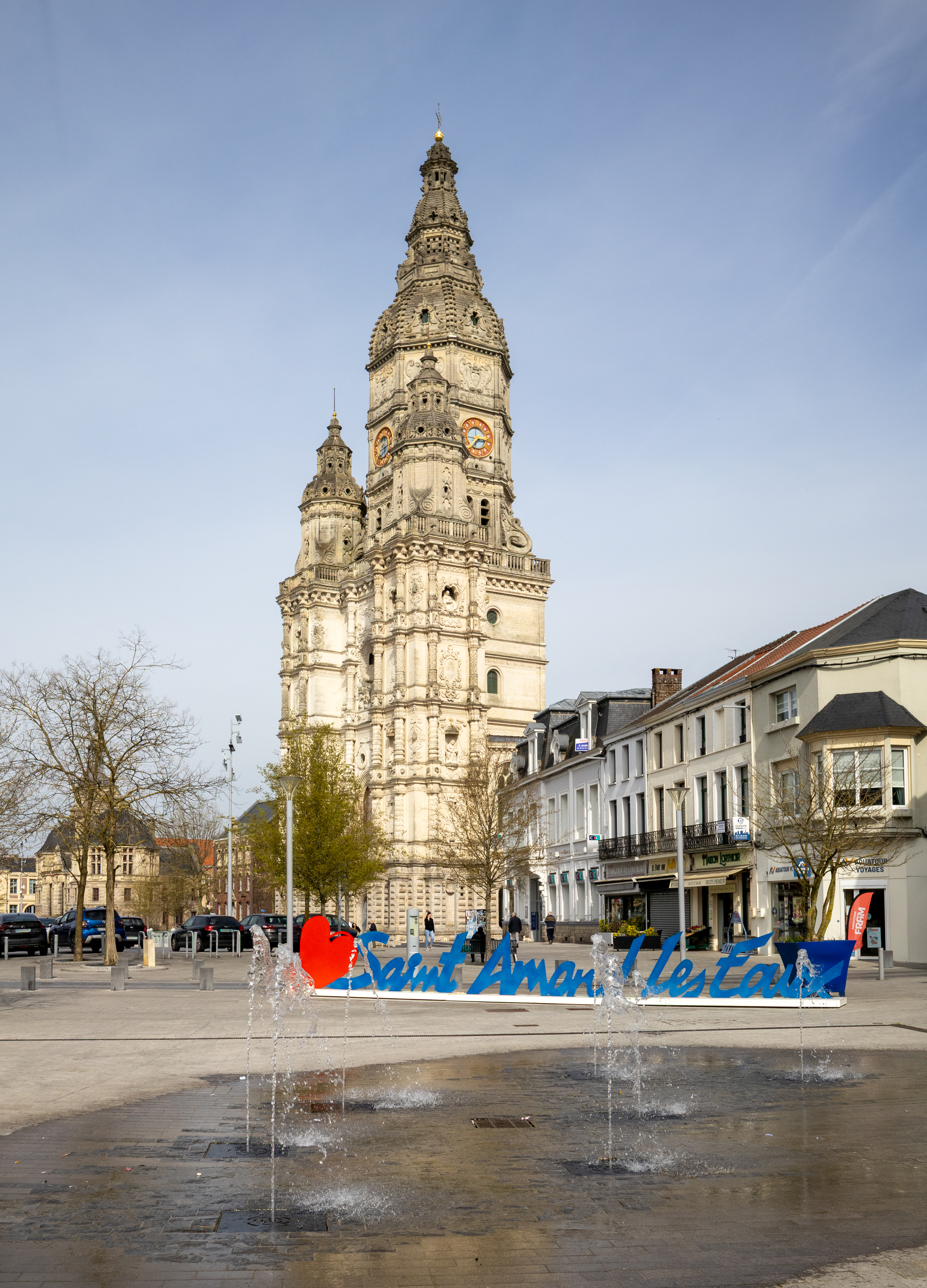
Der Abteiturm

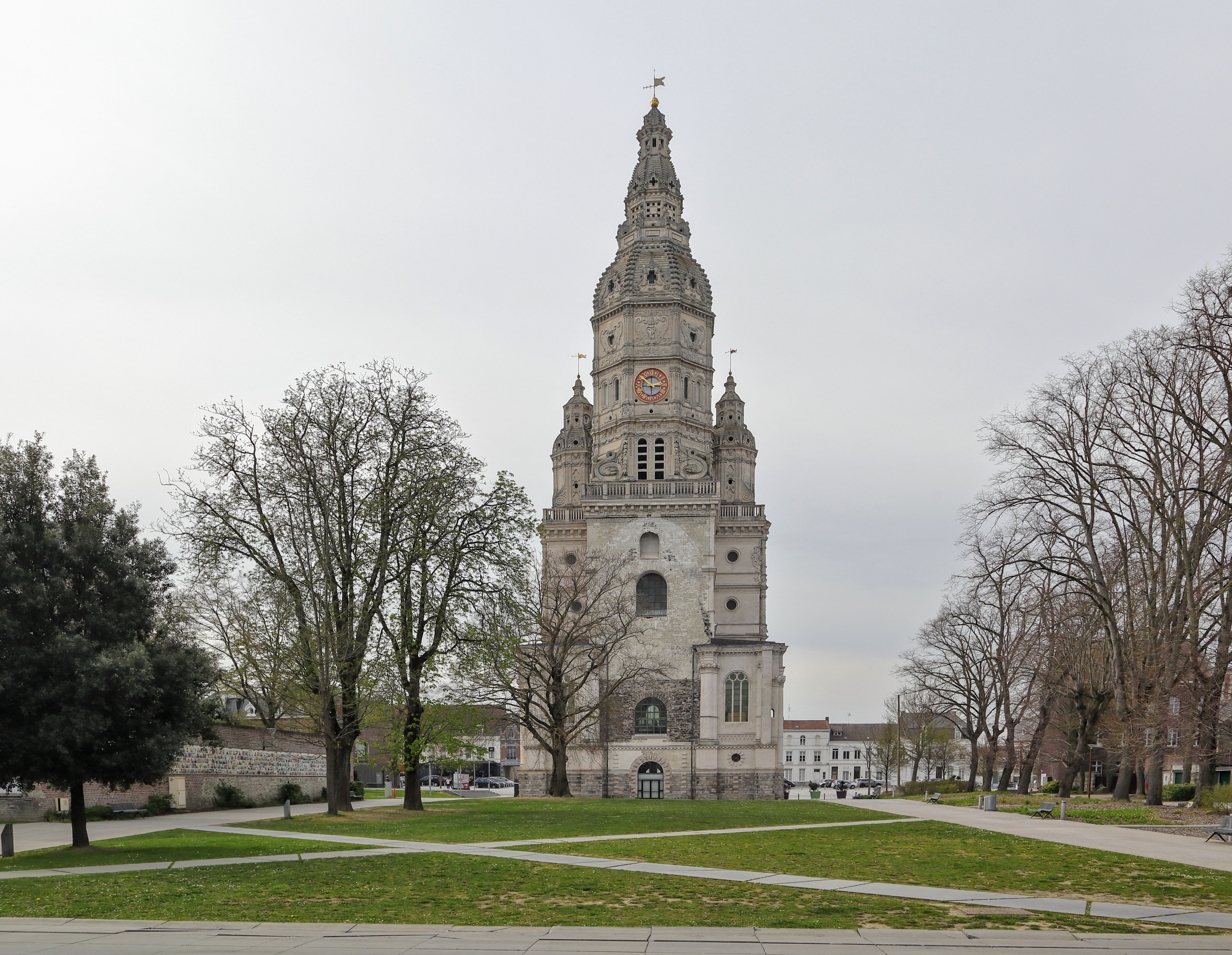

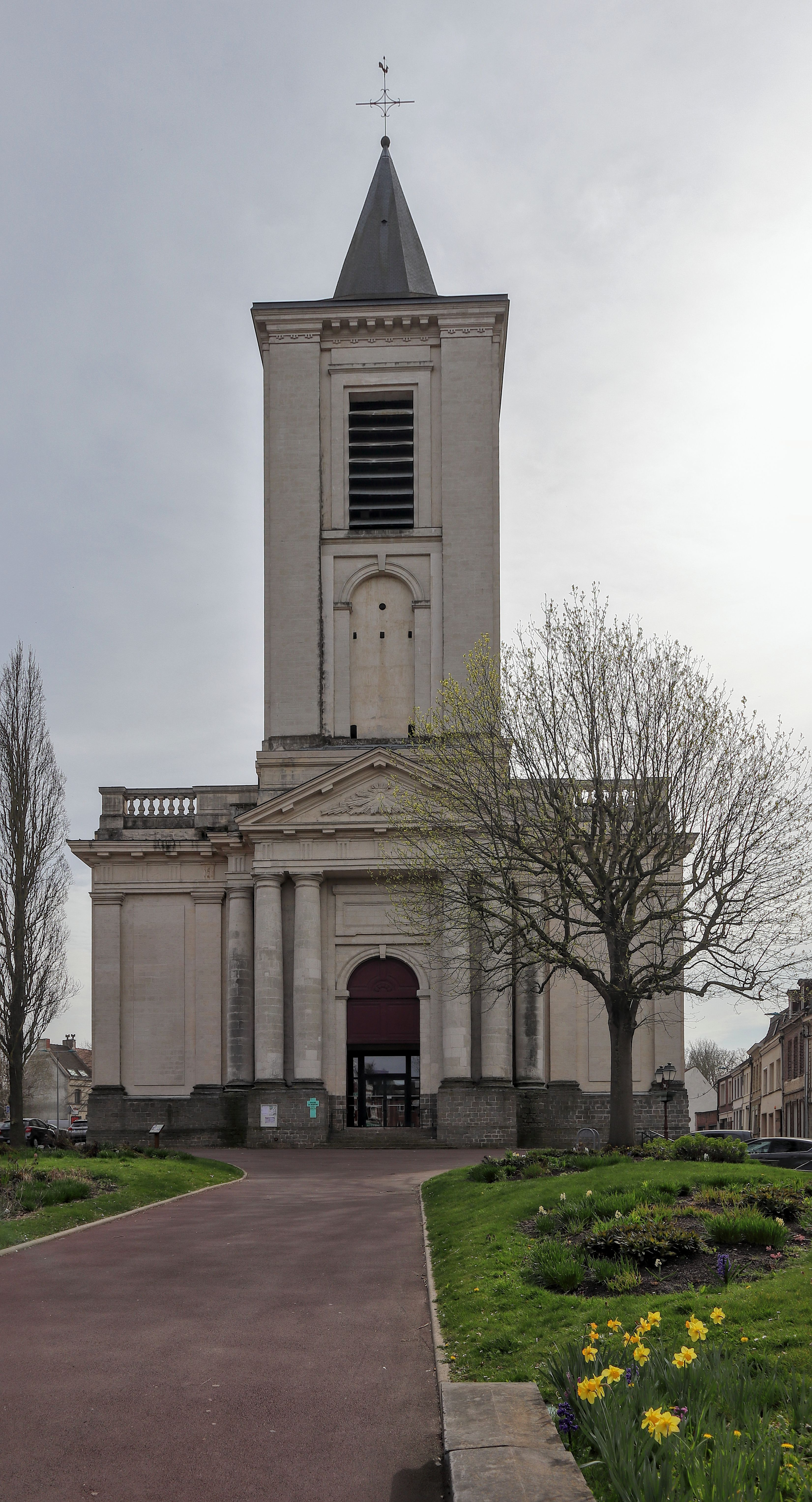
Saint Martin's Church

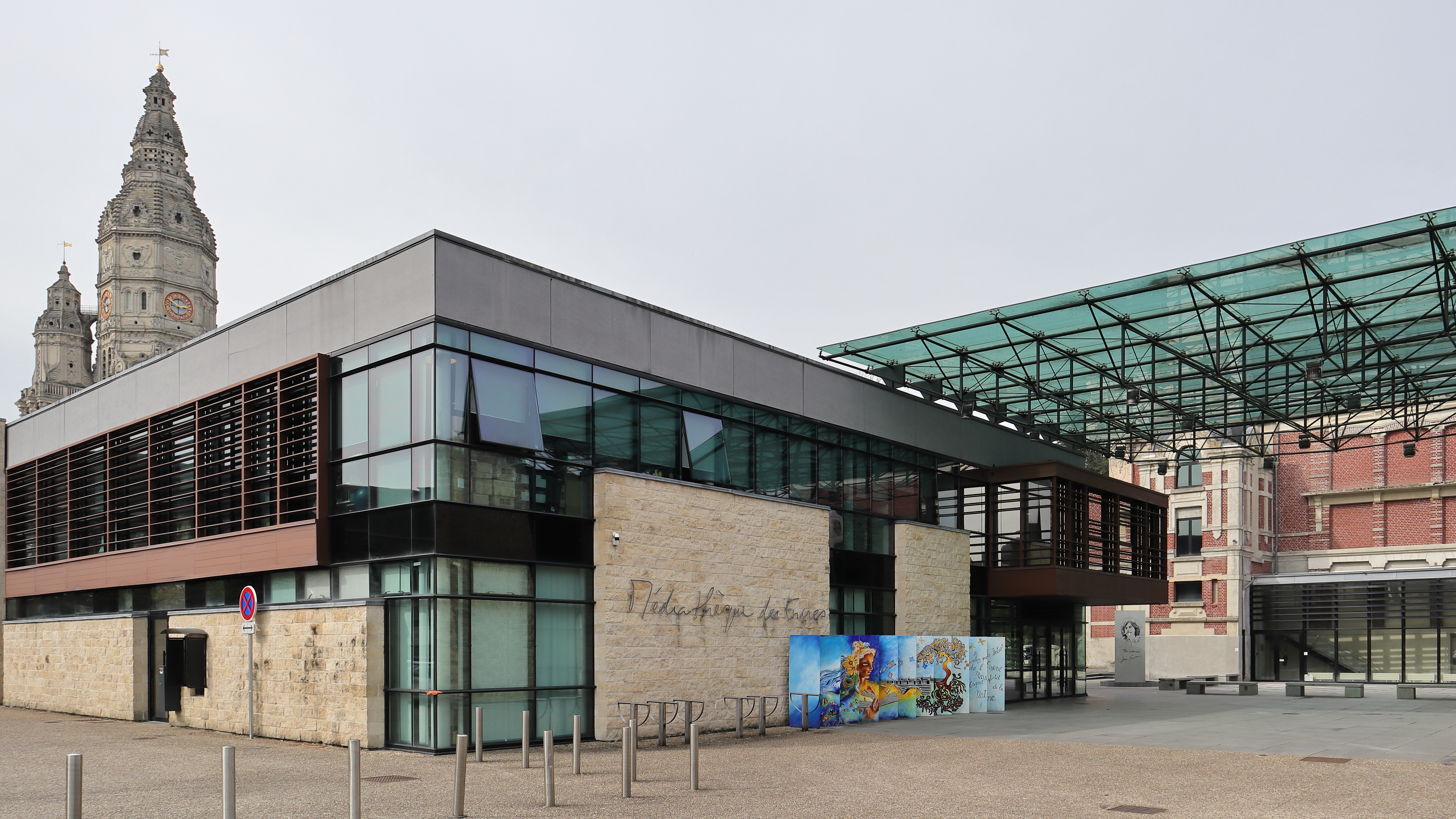
The Media Library

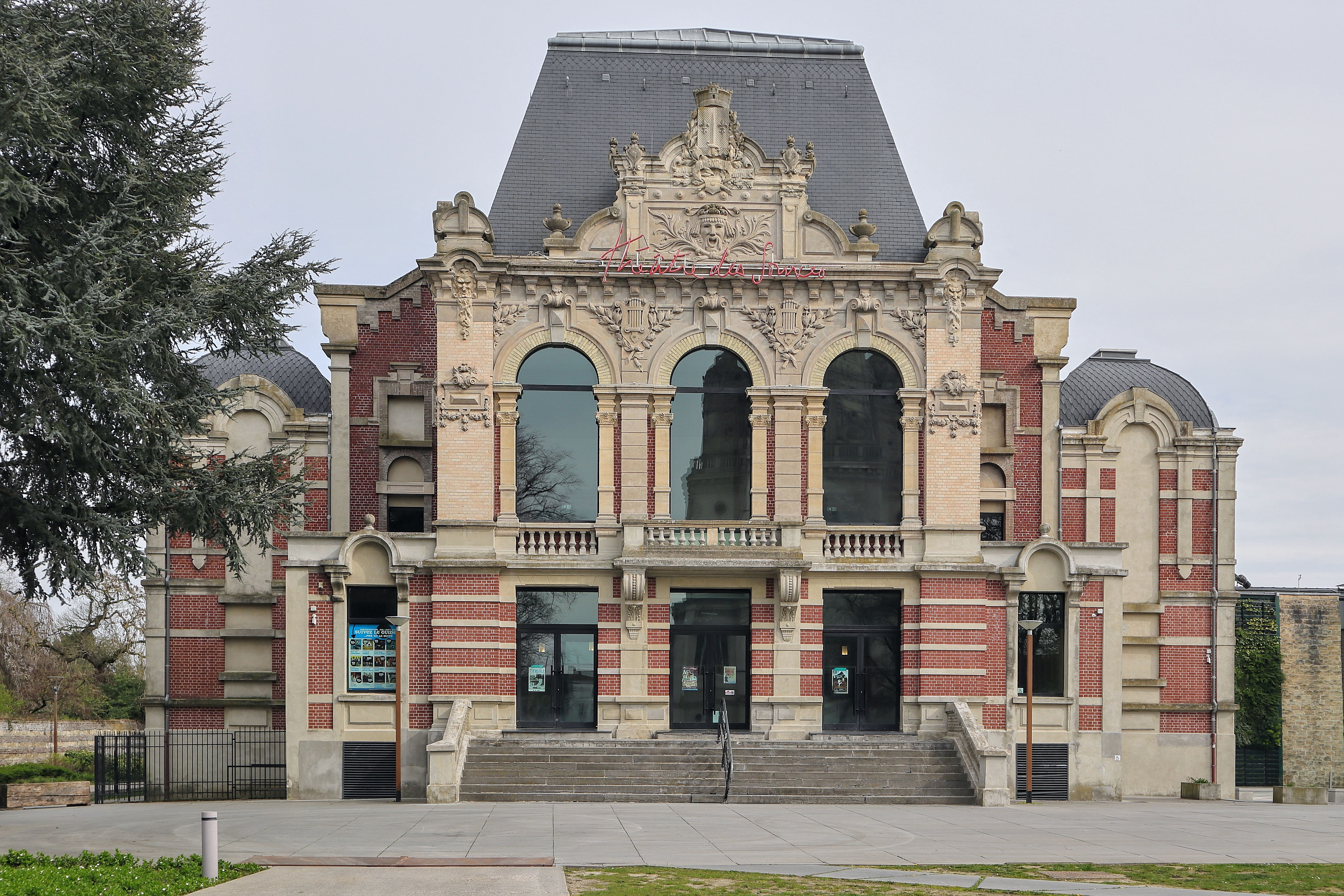
The Theatre

== Notable residents ==
The composer Robert Lannoy (1915–1979) was born in Saint-Amand-les-Eaux.

== Sister cities ==
- Andernach, Germany since 1959.
- Dimona, Israel since 1966.
- Tivoli, Italy since 2001.
- Irvine, Scotland

== See also ==
- Communes of the Nord department
