= Château-l'Abbaye =

- Commune
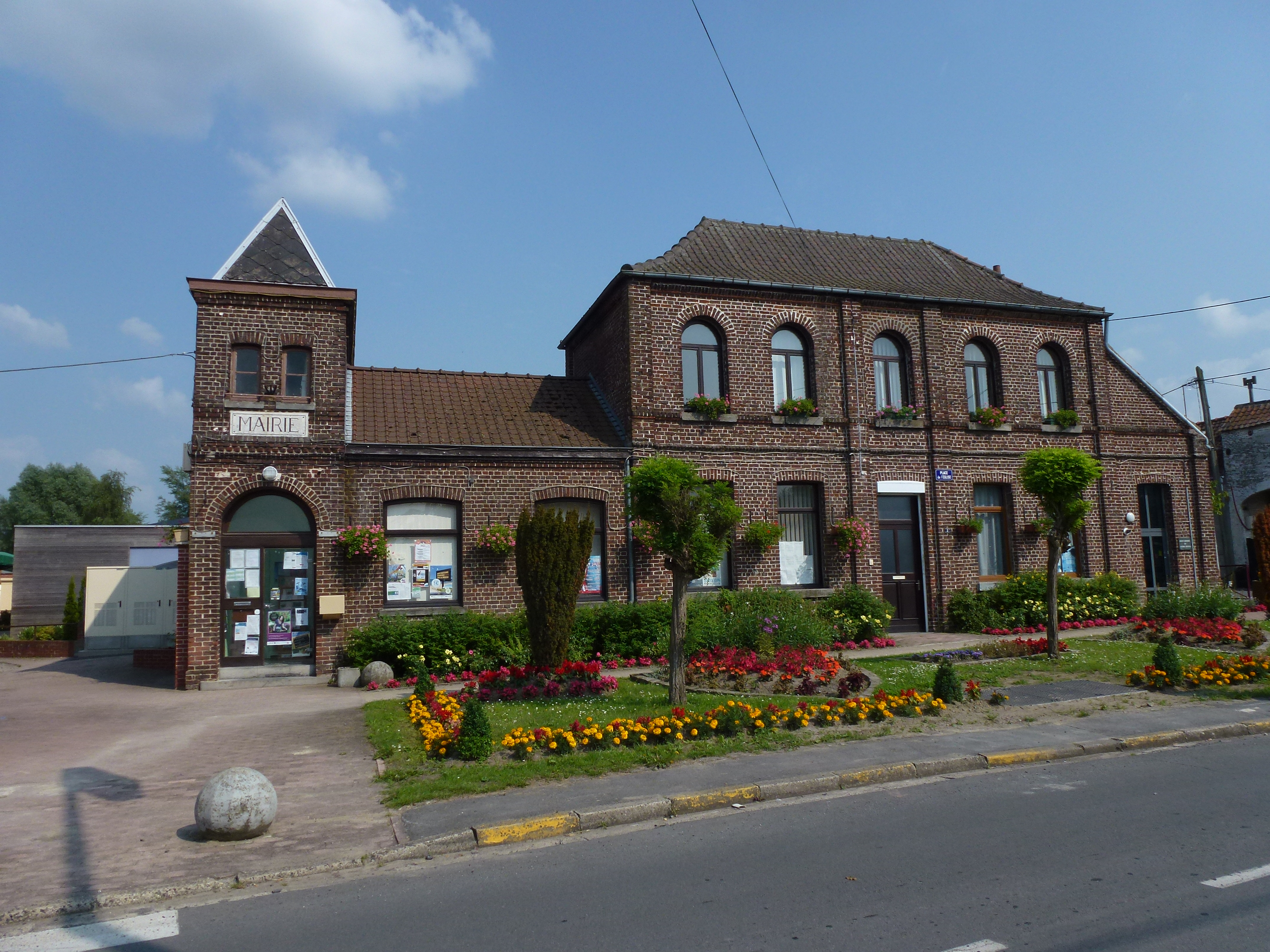
- The town hall in Château-l'Abbaye

- Coat of arms
- Location of Château-l'Abbaye
- Location within France Location within Hauts-de-France
- Coordinates: 50°29′05″N 3°28′48″E
- Country: France
- Region: Hauts-de-France
- Department: Nord
- Arrondissement: Valenciennes
- Canton: Saint-Amand-les-Eaux
- Intercommunality: CA Porte du Hainaut

Government
  - Mayor (2020–2026): Waldemar Domin
- Area^{1}: 4.41 km^{2} (1.70 sq mi)
- Elevation: 30 m (98 ft)
- Highest elevation: 28 m (92 ft)
- Lowest elevation: 13 m (43 ft)
- Population (2023): 917
  - Density: 208/km^{2} (539/sq mi)
- Time zone: UTC+01:00 (CET)
  - Summer (DST): UTC+02:00 (CEST)
- INSEE/Postal code: 59144 /59230
- ^{1} French Land Register data, which excludes lakes, ponds, glaciers > 1 km^{2} (0.386 sq mi or 247 acres) and river estuaries.

Château-l'Abbaye (French pronunciation: [ʃɑto labe.i]; Picard: Catiau-l'Abi) is a commune of the Nord department in northern France.

== Heraldry ==
Arms of Château-l'Abbaye	The arms of Château-l'Abbaye are blazoned : Gules, a left hand issuant from dexter, vested Or, maintaining a rose Or, slipped and leaved vert.

== See also ==
- Communes of the Nord department
