= Cormeilles, Oise =

Cormeilles
- Commune
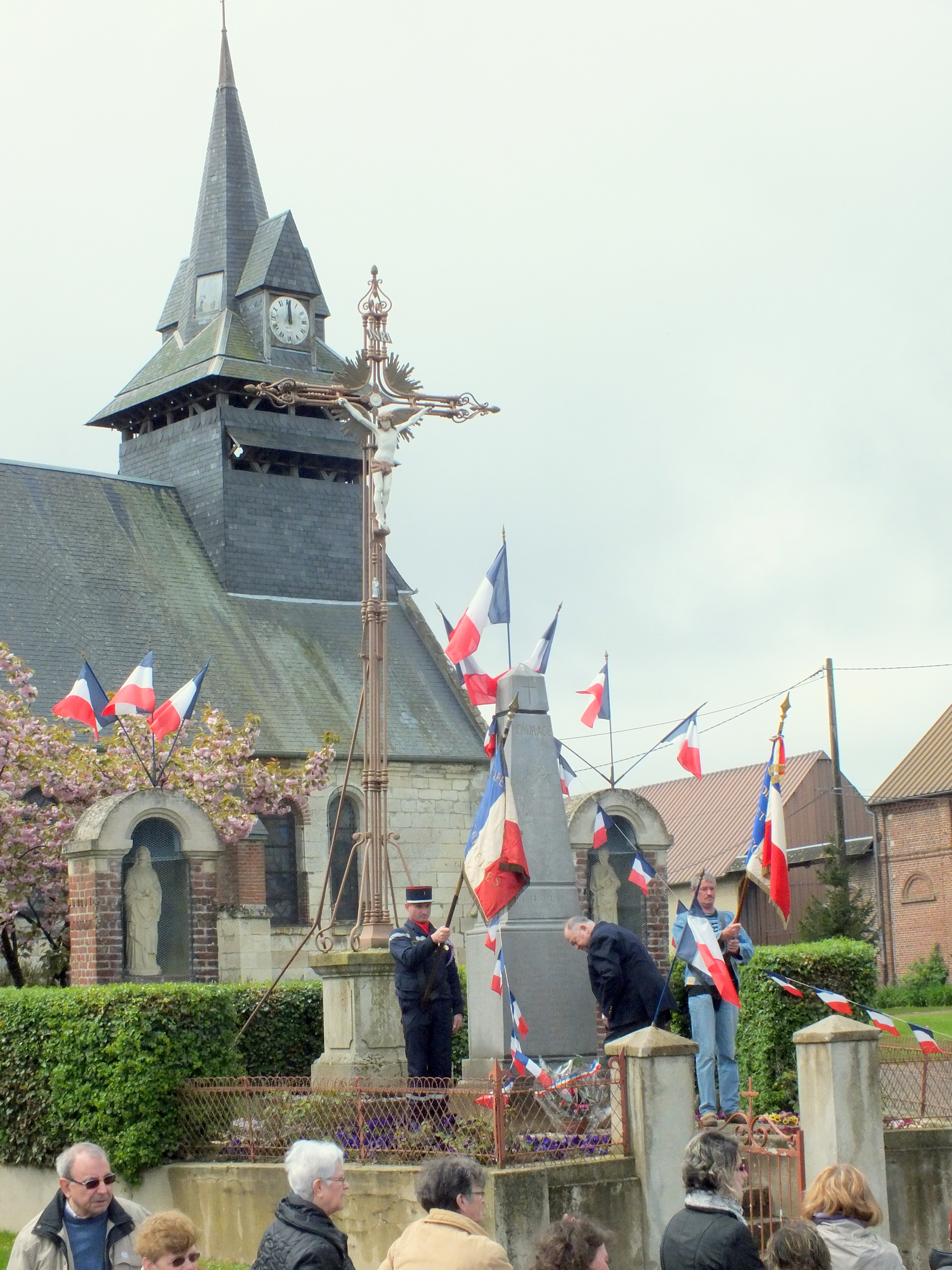
- The church and war memorial in Cormeilles
- Location of Cormeilles
- Location within France Location within Hauts-de-France
- Coordinates: 49°38′23″N 2°11′34″E
- Country: France
- Region: Hauts-de-France
- Department: Oise
- Arrondissement: Beauvais
- Canton: Saint-Just-en-Chaussée

Government
  - Mayor (2020–2026): Éric Tourain
- Area^{1}: 7.21 km^{2} (2.78 sq mi)
- Elevation: 179 m (587 ft)
- Highest elevation: 181 m (594 ft)
- Lowest elevation: 117 m (384 ft)
- Population (2023): 392
  - Density: 54.4/km^{2} (141/sq mi)
- Time zone: UTC+01:00 (CET)
  - Summer (DST): UTC+02:00 (CEST)
- INSEE/Postal code: 60163 /60120
- ^{1} French Land Register data, which excludes lakes, ponds, glaciers > 1 km^{2} (0.386 sq mi or 247 acres) and river estuaries.

Cormeilles (French pronunciation: [kɔʁmɛj]) is a commune in the Oise department in northern France.

== Demography ==
Historical population
Year	Pop.	±% p.a.
1968	181	—
1975	253	+4.90%
1982	217	−2.17%
1990	257	+2.14%
1999	286	+1.20%
2007	339	+2.15%
2012	408	+3.77%
2017	421	+0.63%
2023	392	−1.18%
Source: INSEE

== See also ==
- Communes of the Oise department
