= Lourches =

- Commune
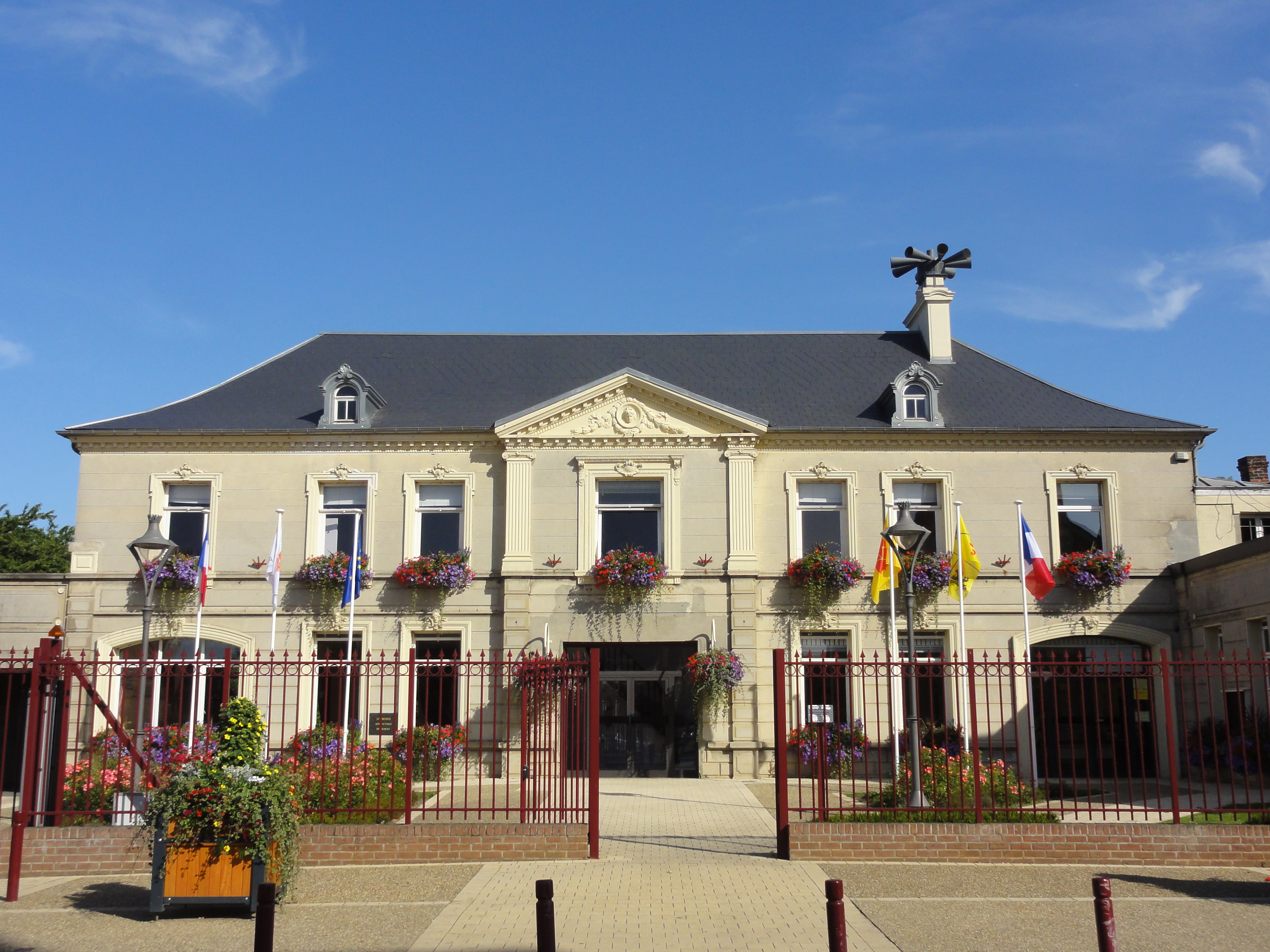
- The town hall in Lourches

- Coat of arms
- Location of Lourches
- Location within France Location within Hauts-de-France
- Coordinates: 50°18′54″N 3°21′22″E
- Country: France
- Region: Hauts-de-France
- Department: Nord
- Arrondissement: Valenciennes
- Canton: Denain
- Intercommunality: CA Porte du Hainaut

Government
  - Mayor (2020–2026): Dalila Duwez Guesmia
- Area^{1}: 2.65 km^{2} (1.02 sq mi)
- Elevation: 38 m (125 ft)
- Highest elevation: 42 m (138 ft)
- Lowest elevation: 28 m (92 ft)
- Population (2023): 3,734
  - Density: 1,410/km^{2} (3,650/sq mi)
- Time zone: UTC+01:00 (CET)
  - Summer (DST): UTC+02:00 (CEST)
- INSEE/Postal code: 59361 /59156
- ^{1} French Land Register data, which excludes lakes, ponds, glaciers > 1 km^{2} (0.386 sq mi or 247 acres) and river estuaries.

Lourches (French pronunciation: [luʁʃ]) is a commune in the Nord department in northern France.

== Population ==
Historical population
Year	Pop.	±% p.a.
1968	5,595	—
1975	4,666	−2.56%
1982	3,742	−3.10%
1990	3,644	−0.33%
1999	3,781	+0.41%
2007	3,937	+0.51%
2012	3,881	−0.29%
2017	3,949	+0.35%
2023	3,734	−0.93%
Source: INSEE

== Heraldry ==
Arms of Lourches	The arms of Lourches are blazoned : Azure, semy de lys Or. = France Ancient (Ansacq, Brillon, Escaudain, Escautpont, Hélesmes, Hérin, Lecelles, Lieu-Saint-Amand, Lourches, Neuville-sur-Escaut, Rosult, Rumegies and Wignehies use the same arms.)

== See also ==
- Communes of the Nord department
