= Hérin =

- Commune
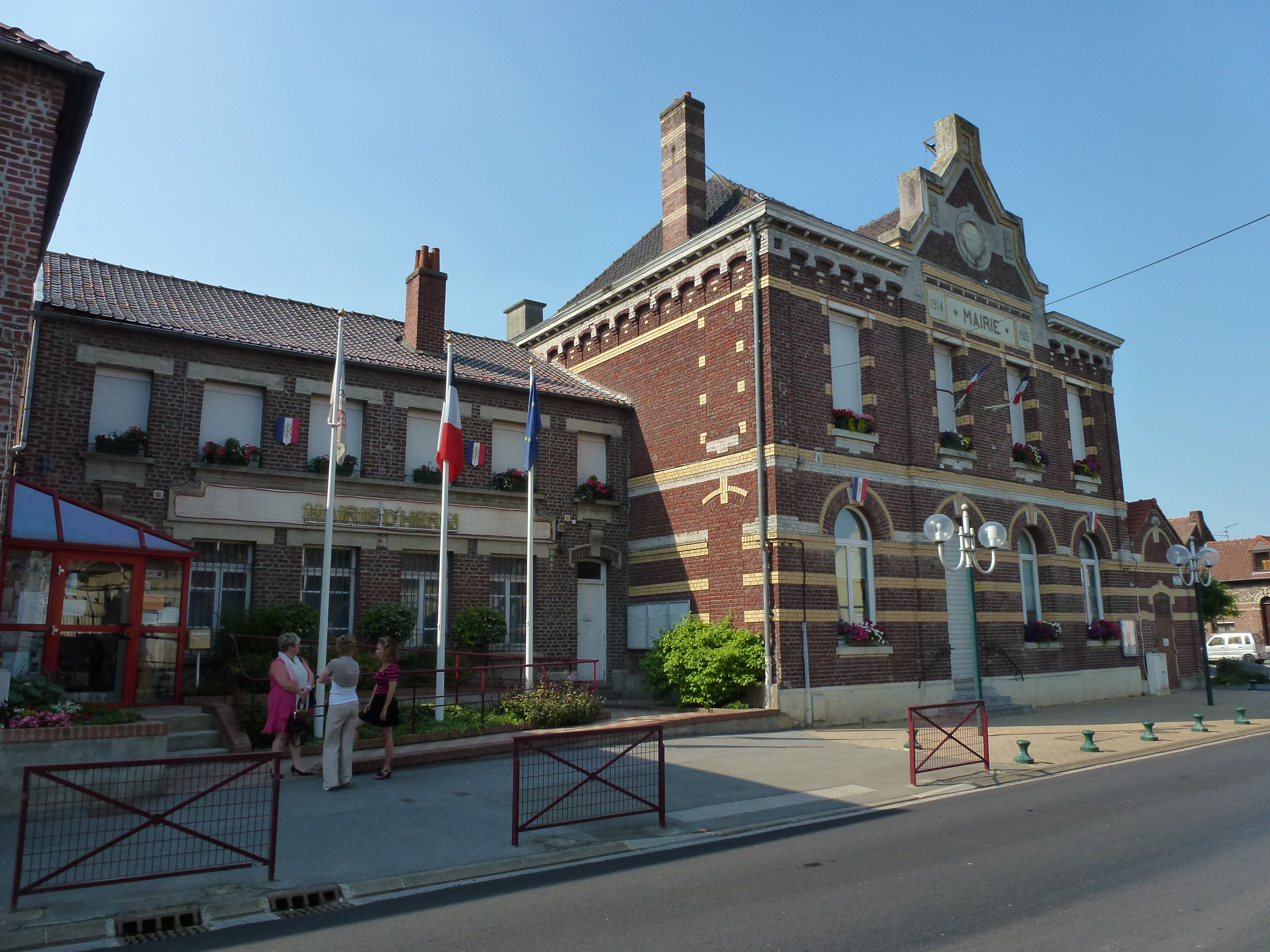
- The town hall in Hérin

- Coat of arms
- Location of Hérin
- Location within France Location within Hauts-de-France
- Coordinates: 50°21′19″N 3°27′11″E
- Country: France
- Region: Hauts-de-France
- Department: Nord
- Arrondissement: Valenciennes
- Canton: Aulnoy-lez-Valenciennes
- Intercommunality: CA Porte du Hainaut

Government
  - Mayor (2020–2026): Jean-Paul Comyn
- Area^{1}: 4.48 km^{2} (1.73 sq mi)
- Highest elevation: 115 m (377 ft)
- Lowest elevation: 36 m (118 ft)
- Population (2023): 4,169
  - Density: 931/km^{2} (2,410/sq mi)
- Time zone: UTC+01:00 (CET)
  - Summer (DST): UTC+02:00 (CEST)
- INSEE/Postal code: 59302 /59195
- ^{1} French Land Register data, which excludes lakes, ponds, glaciers > 1 km^{2} (0.386 sq mi or 247 acres) and river estuaries.

Hérin (French pronunciation: [eʁɛ̃]) is a commune in the Nord department in northern France.

== Population ==
Historical population
Year	Pop.	±% p.a.
1968	4,025	—
1975	3,695	−1.21%
1982	3,566	−0.51%
1990	3,952	+1.29%
1999	3,939	−0.04%
2007	3,800	−0.45%
2012	3,936	+0.71%
2017	4,135	+0.99%
2023	4,169	+0.14%
Source: INSEE

== Heraldry ==
Arms of Hérin	The arms of Hérin are blazoned : Azure, semy de lys Or. = France Ancient (Ansacq, Brillon, Escaudain, Escautpont, Hélesmes, Hérin, Lecelles, Lieu-Saint-Amand, Lourches, Neuville-sur-Escaut, Rosult, Rumegies and Wignehies use the same arms.)

== See also ==
- Communes of the Nord department
