= Escautpont =

- Commune
- Coat of arms
- Location of Escautpont
- Location within France Location within Hauts-de-France
- Coordinates: 50°25′30″N 3°33′32″E
- Country: France
- Region: Hauts-de-France
- Department: Nord
- Arrondissement: Valenciennes
- Canton: Anzin
- Intercommunality: CA Porte du Hainaut

Government
  - Mayor (2024–2026): Raphaël Kruszynski
- Area^{1}: 5.78 km^{2} (2.23 sq mi)
- Elevation: 28 m (92 ft)
- Highest elevation: 41 m (135 ft)
- Lowest elevation: 17 m (56 ft)
- Population (2023): 4,202
  - Density: 727/km^{2} (1,880/sq mi)
- Time zone: UTC+01:00 (CET)
  - Summer (DST): UTC+02:00 (CEST)
- INSEE/Postal code: 59207 /59278
- ^{1} French Land Register data, which excludes lakes, ponds, glaciers > 1 km^{2} (0.386 sq mi or 247 acres) and river estuaries.

Escautpont (French pronunciation: [ekopɔ̃]; West Flemish: Schledebrug) is a commune in the Nord department in northern France.

== Name ==
Escautpont is the bridge (pont in French) over the Escaut (Scheldt river). Named in antiquity Scaldis Pons (same meaning in Latin) because there was, at this place, the only bridge on the Scheldt.

== Population ==
Historical population
| Year | Pop. | ±% p.a. |
|---|---|---|
| 1968 | 5,757 | — |
| 1975 | 5,234 | −1.35% |
| 1982 | 4,742 | −1.40% |
| 1990 | 4,327 | −1.14% |
| 1999 | 4,202 | −0.33% |
| 2007 | 4,210 | +0.02% |
| 2012 | 4,186 | −0.11% |
| 2017 | 4,192 | +0.03% |
| 2023 | 4,202 | +0.04% |
Source: INSEE

== Heraldry ==
| Arms of Escautpont | The arms of Escautpont are blazoned : Azure, semy de lys Or. = France Ancient (Ansacq, Brillon, Escaudain, Escautpont, Hélesmes, Hérin, Lecelles, Lieu-Saint-Amand, Lourches, Neuville-sur-Escaut, Rosult, Rumegies and Wignehies use the same arms.) |

== See also ==
- Communes of the Nord department
