= Apremont, Oise =

Apremont
- Commune
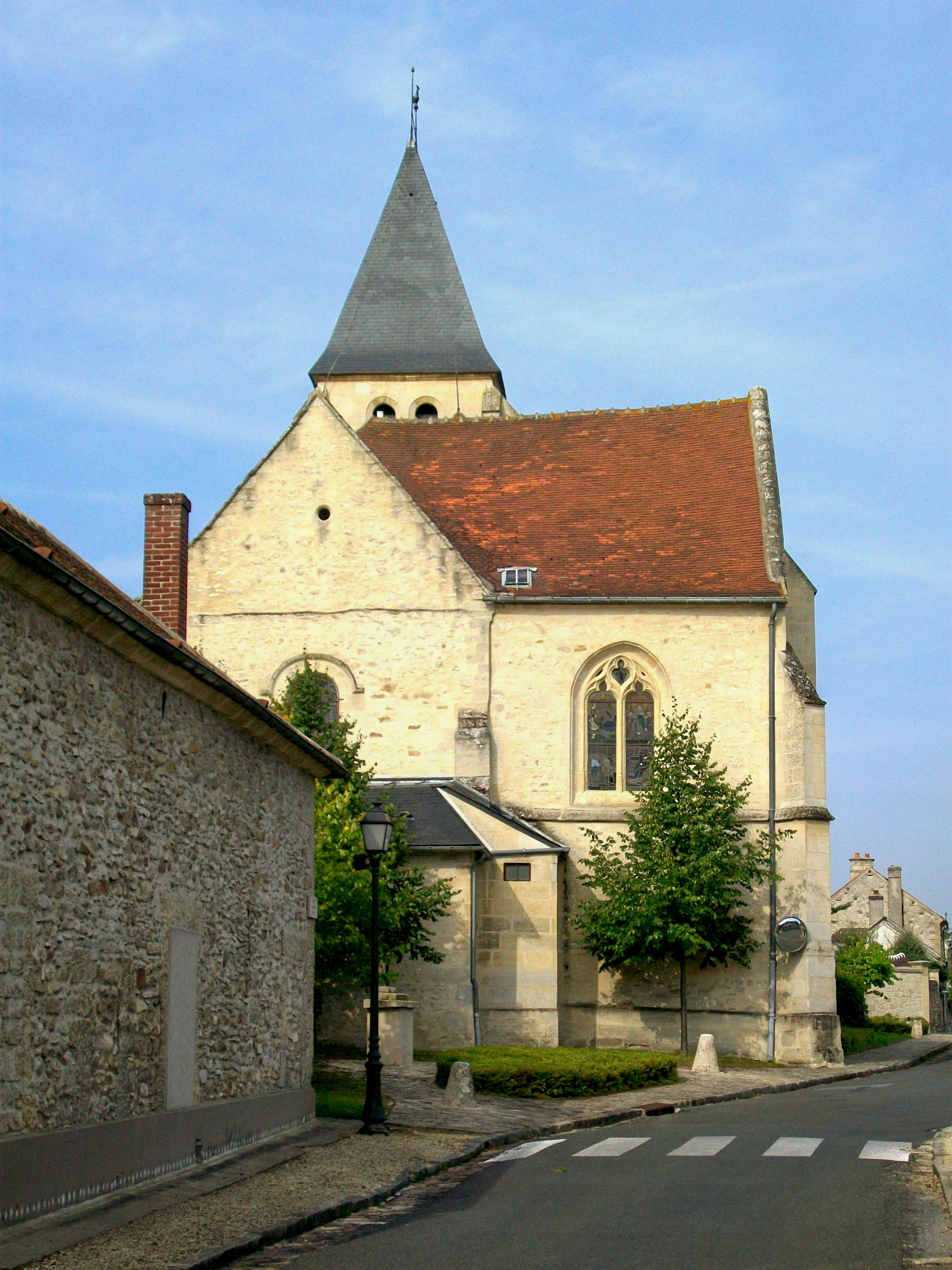
- The church in Apremont

- Coat of arms
- Location of Apremont
- Location within France Location within Hauts-de-France
- Coordinates: 49°13′27″N 2°30′35″E
- Country: France
- Region: Hauts-de-France
- Department: Oise
- Arrondissement: Senlis
- Canton: Chantilly

Government
  - Mayor (2020–2026): Michel Dagniaux
- Area^{1}: 13.62 km^{2} (5.26 sq mi)
- Highest elevation: 133 m (436 ft)
- Lowest elevation: 54 m (177 ft)
- Population (2023): 636
  - Density: 46.7/km^{2} (121/sq mi)
- Time zone: UTC+01:00 (CET)
  - Summer (DST): UTC+02:00 (CEST)
- INSEE/Postal code: 60022 /60300
- ^{1} French Land Register data, which excludes lakes, ponds, glaciers > 1 km^{2} (0.386 sq mi or 247 acres) and river estuaries.

Apremont (French pronunciation: [apʁəmɔ̃]) is a commune in the Oise department in northern France.

== Population ==
Historical population
Year	Pop.	±% p.a.
1968	662	—
1975	785	+2.46%
1982	861	+1.33%
1990	862	+0.01%
1999	813	−0.65%
2007	738	−1.20%
2012	704	−0.94%
2017	660	−1.28%
2023	636	−0.62%
Source: INSEE

== Amenities ==
It has a small primary school with less than 75 children and 3 teachers, a church, a bakery, a library, a little playground and a polo club.

== See also ==
- Communes of the Oise department
