= Rumegies =

- Commune
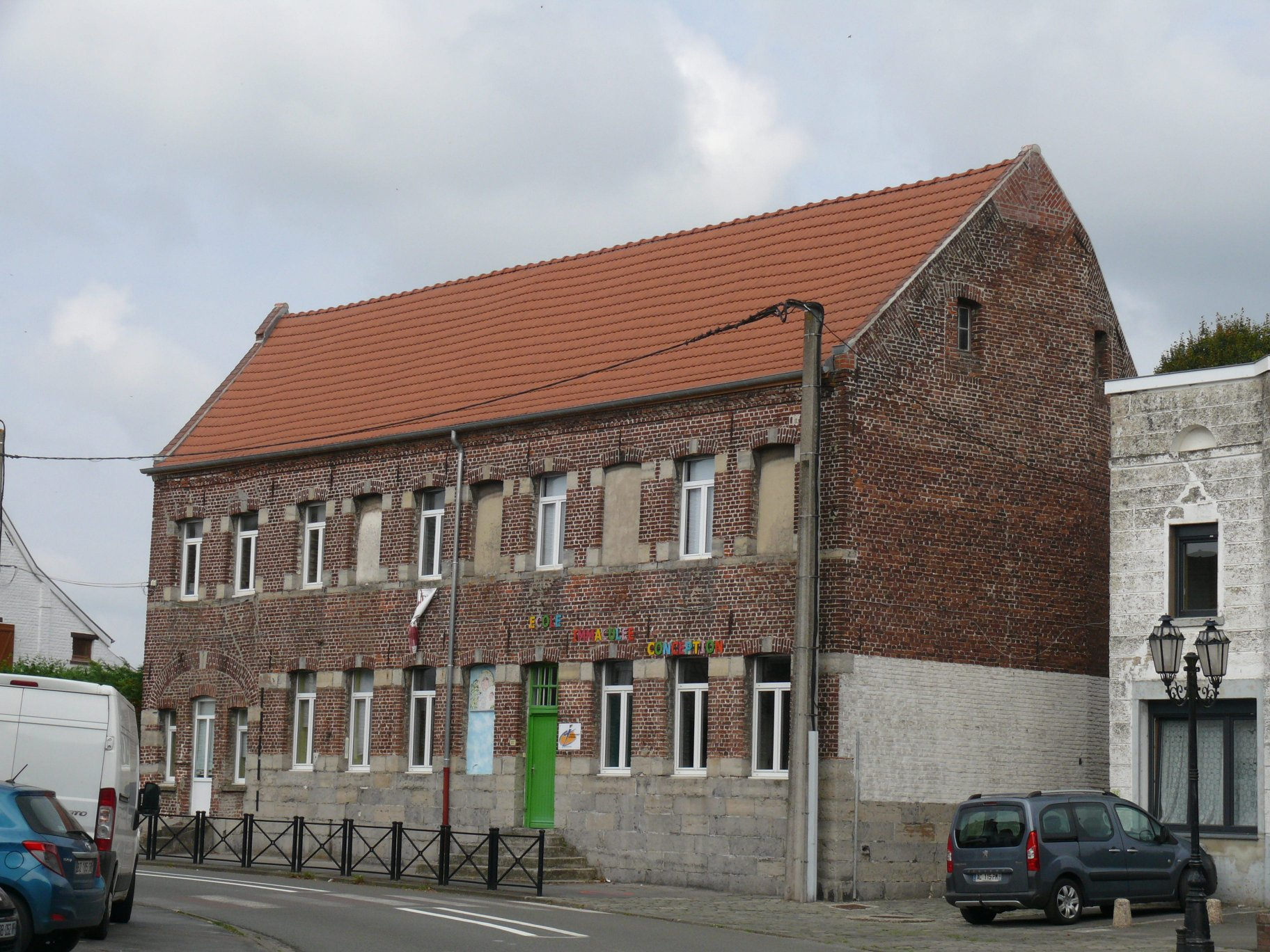
- The school in Rumegies

- Coat of arms
- Location of Rumegies
- Location within France Location within Hauts-de-France
- Coordinates: 50°29′23″N 3°21′02″E
- Country: France
- Region: Hauts-de-France
- Department: Nord
- Arrondissement: Valenciennes
- Canton: Saint-Amand-les-Eaux
- Intercommunality: CA Porte du Hainaut

Government
  - Mayor (2020–2026): Anne Sophie Ghesquiere
- Area^{1}: 7.71 km^{2} (2.98 sq mi)
- Elevation: 32 m (105 ft)
- Highest elevation: 34 m (112 ft)
- Lowest elevation: 18 m (59 ft)
- Population (2023): 1,722
  - Density: 223/km^{2} (578/sq mi)
- Time zone: UTC+01:00 (CET)
  - Summer (DST): UTC+02:00 (CEST)
- INSEE/Postal code: 59519 /59226
- ^{1} French Land Register data, which excludes lakes, ponds, glaciers > 1 km^{2} (0.386 sq mi or 247 acres) and river estuaries.

Rumegies (French pronunciation: [ʁymʒi]) is a commune in the Nord department in northern France.

== Heraldry ==
Arms of Rumegies	The arms of Rumegies are blazoned : Azure, semy de lys Or. = France Ancient (Ansacq, Brillon, Escaudain, Escautpont, Hélesmes, Hérin, Lecelles, Lieu-Saint-Amand, Lourches, Neuville-sur-Escaut, Rosult, Rumegies and Wignehies use the same arms.)

== See also ==
- Communes of the Nord department
