= Lecelles =

- Commune
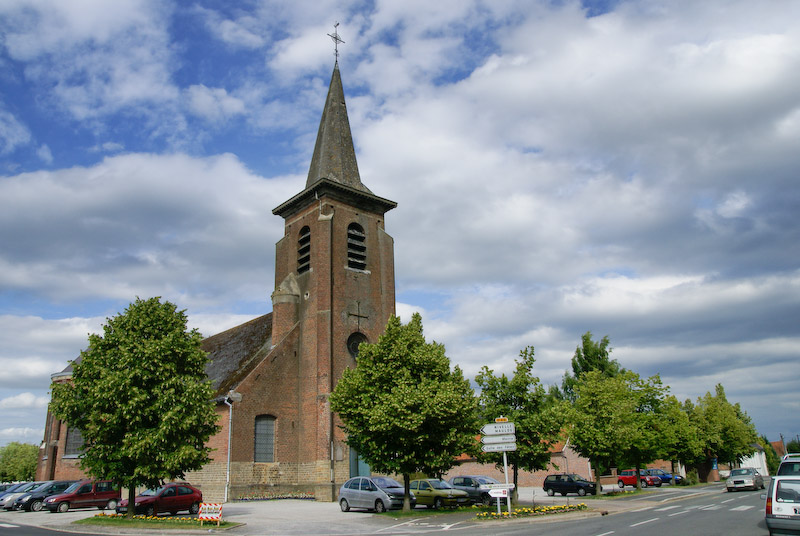
- Lecelles, church: église Saint-Denis

- Coat of arms
- Location of Lecelles
- Location within France Location within Hauts-de-France
- Coordinates: 50°28′17″N 3°23′43″E
- Country: France
- Region: Hauts-de-France
- Department: Nord
- Arrondissement: Valenciennes
- Canton: Saint-Amand-les-Eaux
- Intercommunality: CA Porte du Hainaut

Government
  - Mayor (2020–2026): Jean-Claude Messager
- Area^{1}: 16.24 km^{2} (6.27 sq mi)
- Elevation: 17 m (56 ft)
- Highest elevation: 26 m (85 ft)
- Lowest elevation: 15 m (49 ft)
- Population (2023): 3,046
  - Density: 187.6/km^{2} (485.8/sq mi)
- Time zone: UTC+01:00 (CET)
  - Summer (DST): UTC+02:00 (CEST)
- INSEE/Postal code: 59335 /59226
- ^{1} French Land Register data, which excludes lakes, ponds, glaciers > 1 km^{2} (0.386 sq mi or 247 acres) and river estuaries.

Lecelles (French pronunciation: [ləsɛl]) is a commune in the Nord department in northern France.

== Population ==
Historical population
| Year | Pop. | ±% p.a. |
|---|---|---|
| 1968 | 2,152 | — |
| 1975 | 2,356 | +1.30% |
| 1982 | 2,402 | +0.28% |
| 1990 | 2,563 | +0.81% |
| 1999 | 2,662 | +0.42% |
| 2007 | 2,733 | +0.33% |
| 2012 | 2,684 | −0.36% |
| 2017 | 2,810 | +0.92% |
| 2023 | 3,046 | +1.35% |
Source: INSEE

== Gallery ==
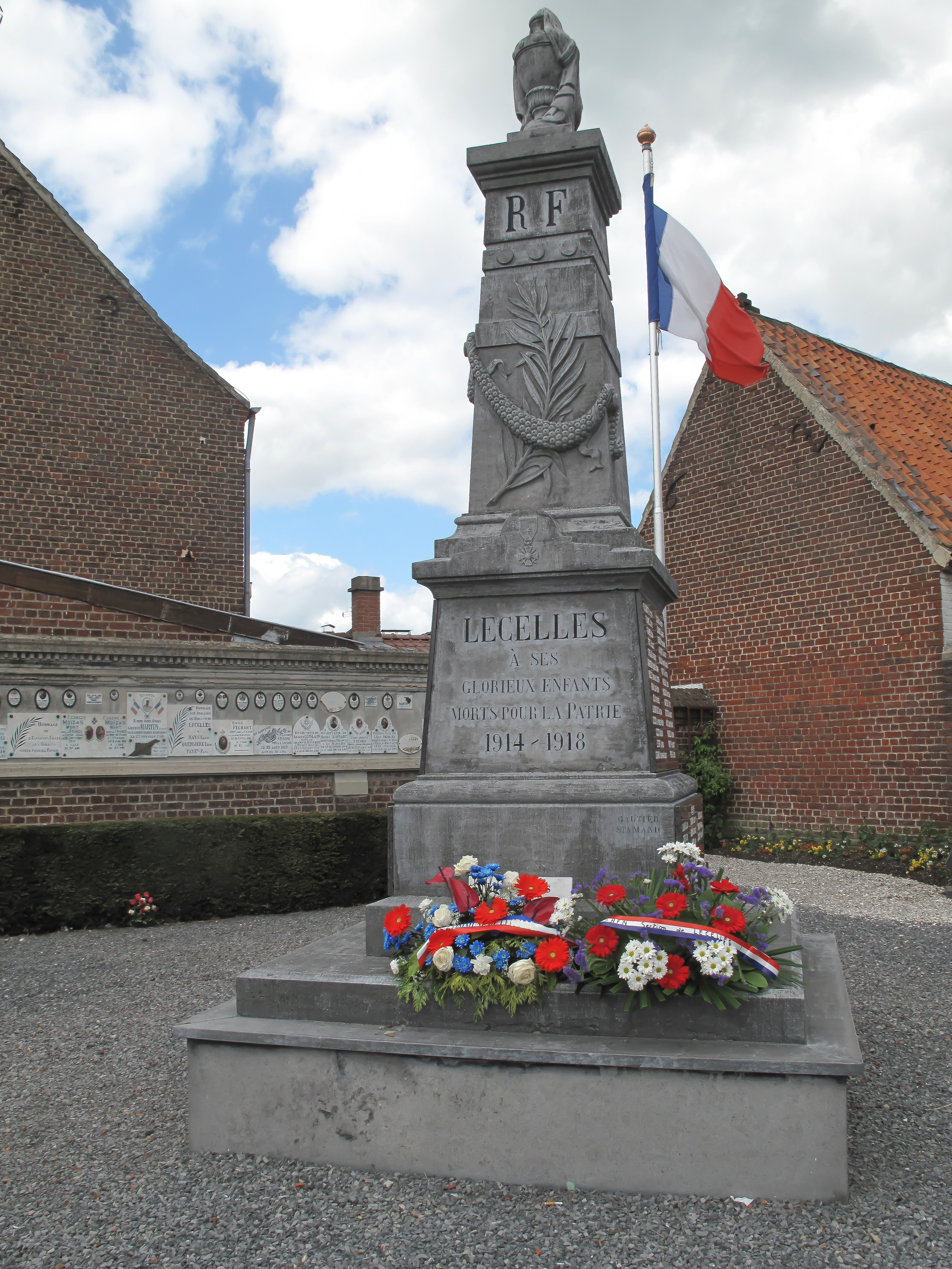
Lecelles, war memorial

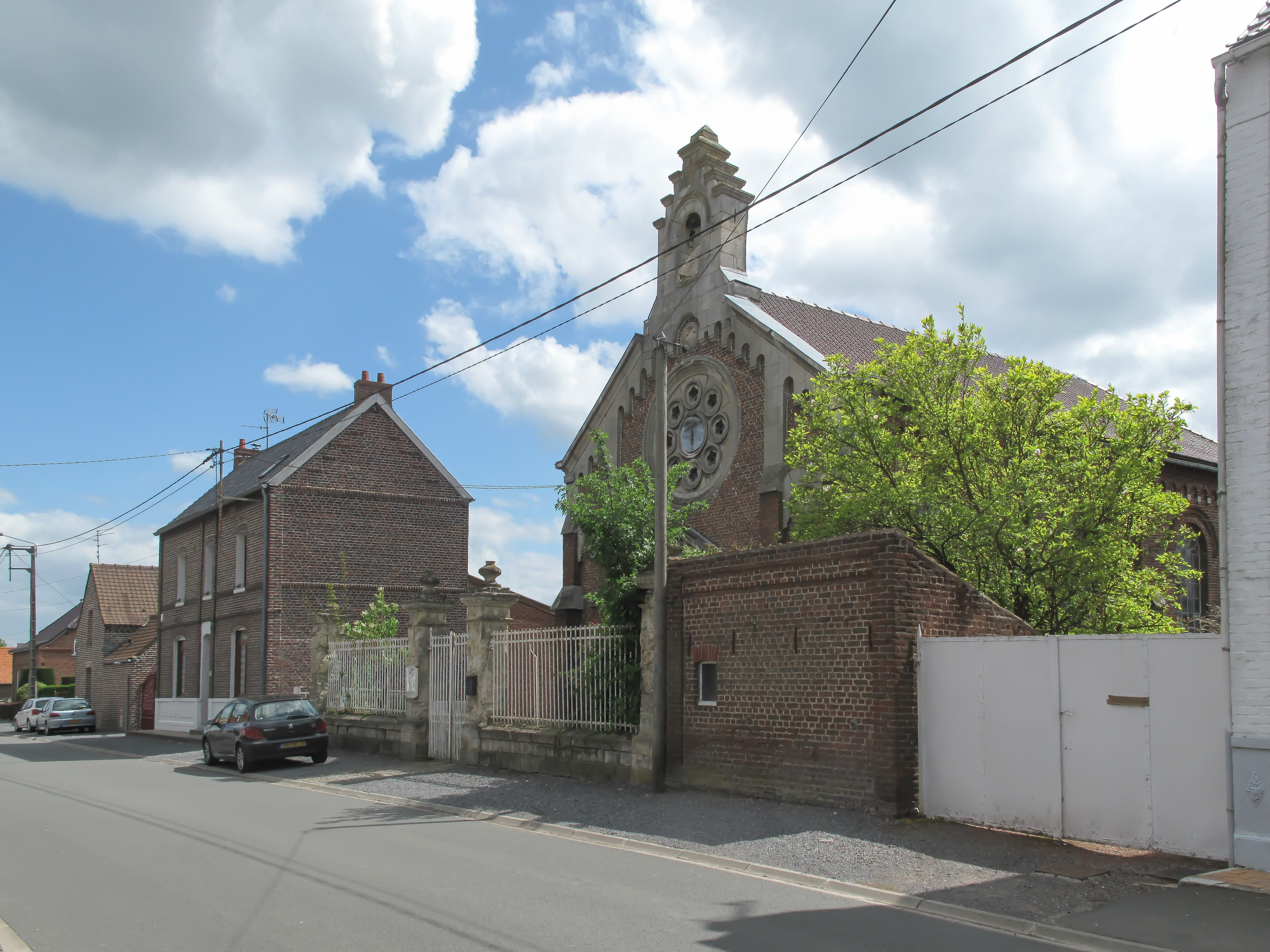
Lecelles, view to a street

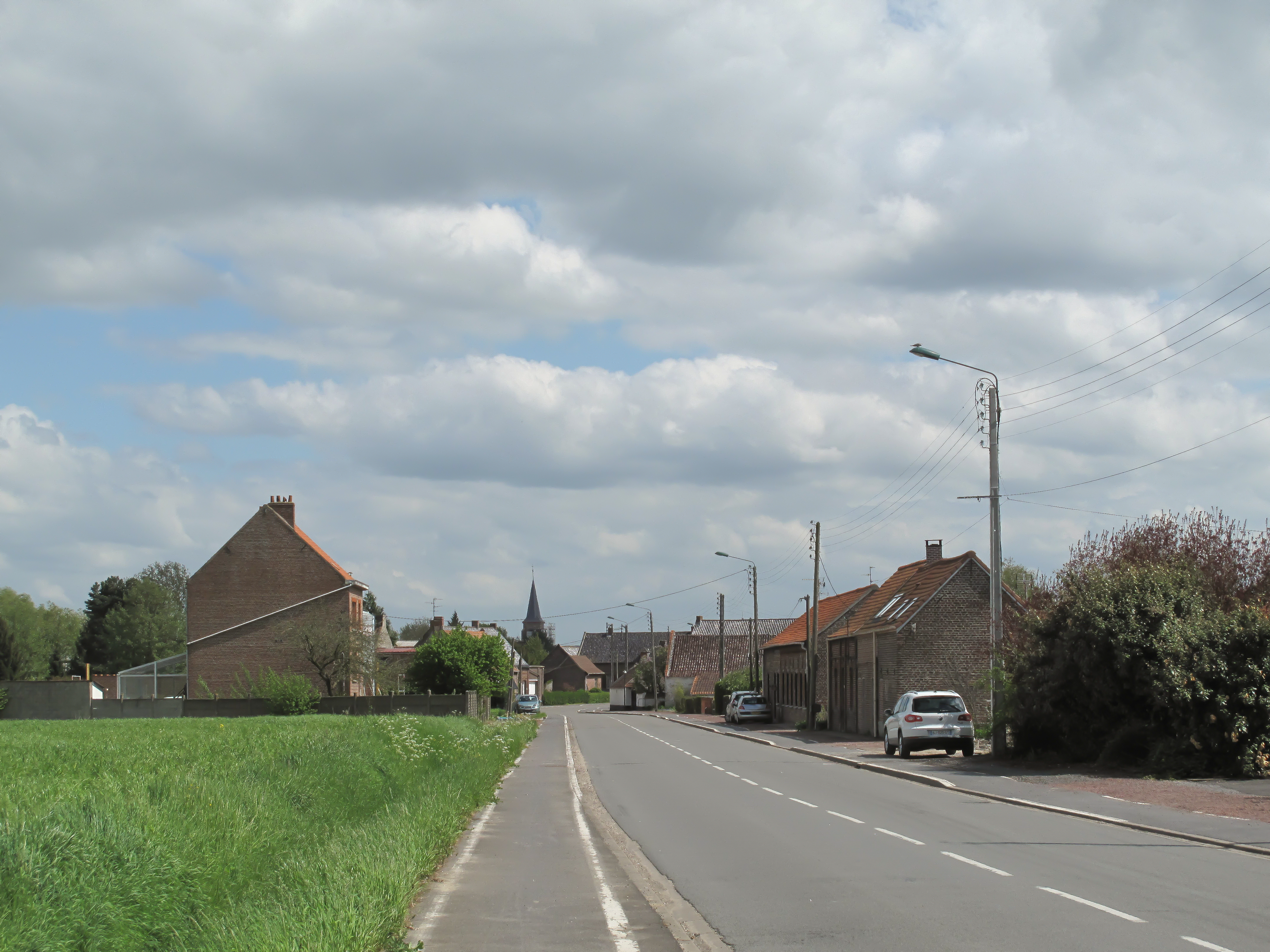
Lecelles, view to a street

== Heraldry ==
| Arms of Lecelles | The arms of Lecelles are blazoned : Azure, semy de lys Or. = France Ancient (Ansacq, Brillon, Escaudain, Escautpont, Hélesmes, Hérin, Lecelles, Lieu-Saint-Amand, Lourches, Neuville-sur-Escaut, Rosult, Rumegies and Wignehies use the same arms.) |

== See also ==
- Communes of the Nord department
