= Neuville-sur-Escaut =

- Commune
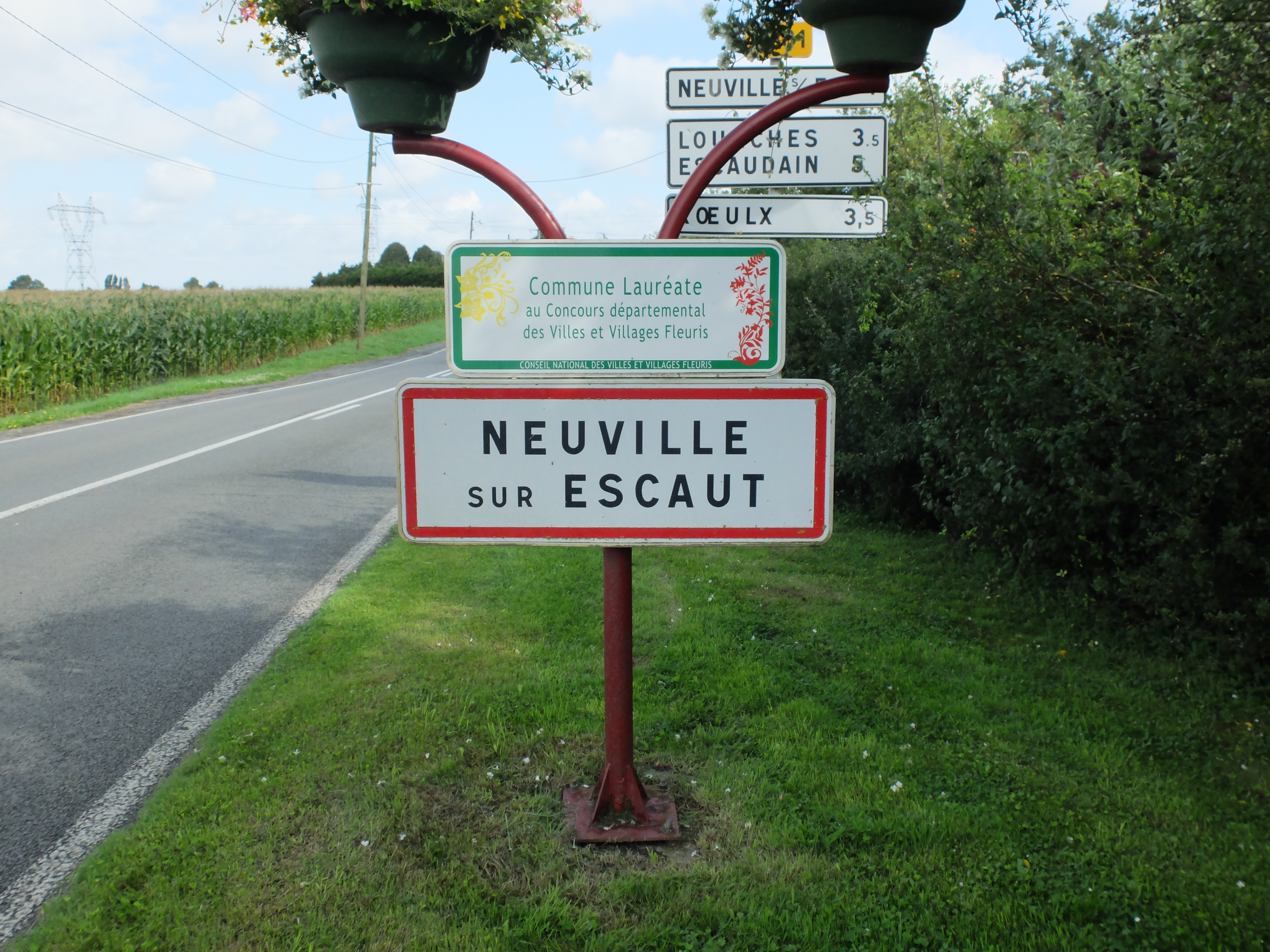
- The road into Neuville-sur-Escaut

- Coat of arms
- Location of Neuville-sur-Escaut
- Location within France Location within Hauts-de-France
- Coordinates: 50°18′N 3°21′E
- Country: France
- Region: Hauts-de-France
- Department: Nord
- Arrondissement: Valenciennes
- Canton: Denain
- Intercommunality: CA Porte du Hainaut

Government
  - Mayor (2020–2026): Pascal Jean
- Area^{1}: 4.74 km^{2} (1.83 sq mi)
- Elevation: 40 m (130 ft)
- Highest elevation: 67 m (220 ft)
- Lowest elevation: 31 m (102 ft)
- Population (2023): 2,901
  - Density: 612/km^{2} (1,590/sq mi)
- Time zone: UTC+01:00 (CET)
  - Summer (DST): UTC+02:00 (CEST)
- INSEE/Postal code: 59429 /59293
- ^{1} French Land Register data, which excludes lakes, ponds, glaciers > 1 km^{2} (0.386 sq mi or 247 acres) and river estuaries.

Neuville-sur-Escaut (French pronunciation: [nøvil syʁ ɛsko], literally Neuville on Escaut) is a commune in the Nord department in northern France.

== Population ==
Historical population
Year	Pop.	±% p.a.
1968	3,096	—
1975	3,287	+0.86%
1982	3,042	−1.10%
1990	2,995	−0.19%
1999	2,799	−0.75%
2007	2,682	−0.53%
2012	2,580	−0.77%
2017	2,702	+0.93%
2023	2,901	+1.19%
Source: INSEE

== Heraldry ==
Arms of Neuville-sur-Escaut	The arms of Neuville-sur-Escaut are blazoned : Azure, semy de lys Or. = France Ancient (Ansacq, Brillon, Escaudain, Escautpont, Hélesmes, Hérin, Lecelles, Lieu-Saint-Amand, Lourches, Neuville-sur-Escaut, Rosult, Rumegies and Wignehies use the same arms.)

== See also ==
- Communes of the Nord department
