= Brillon =

- Commune
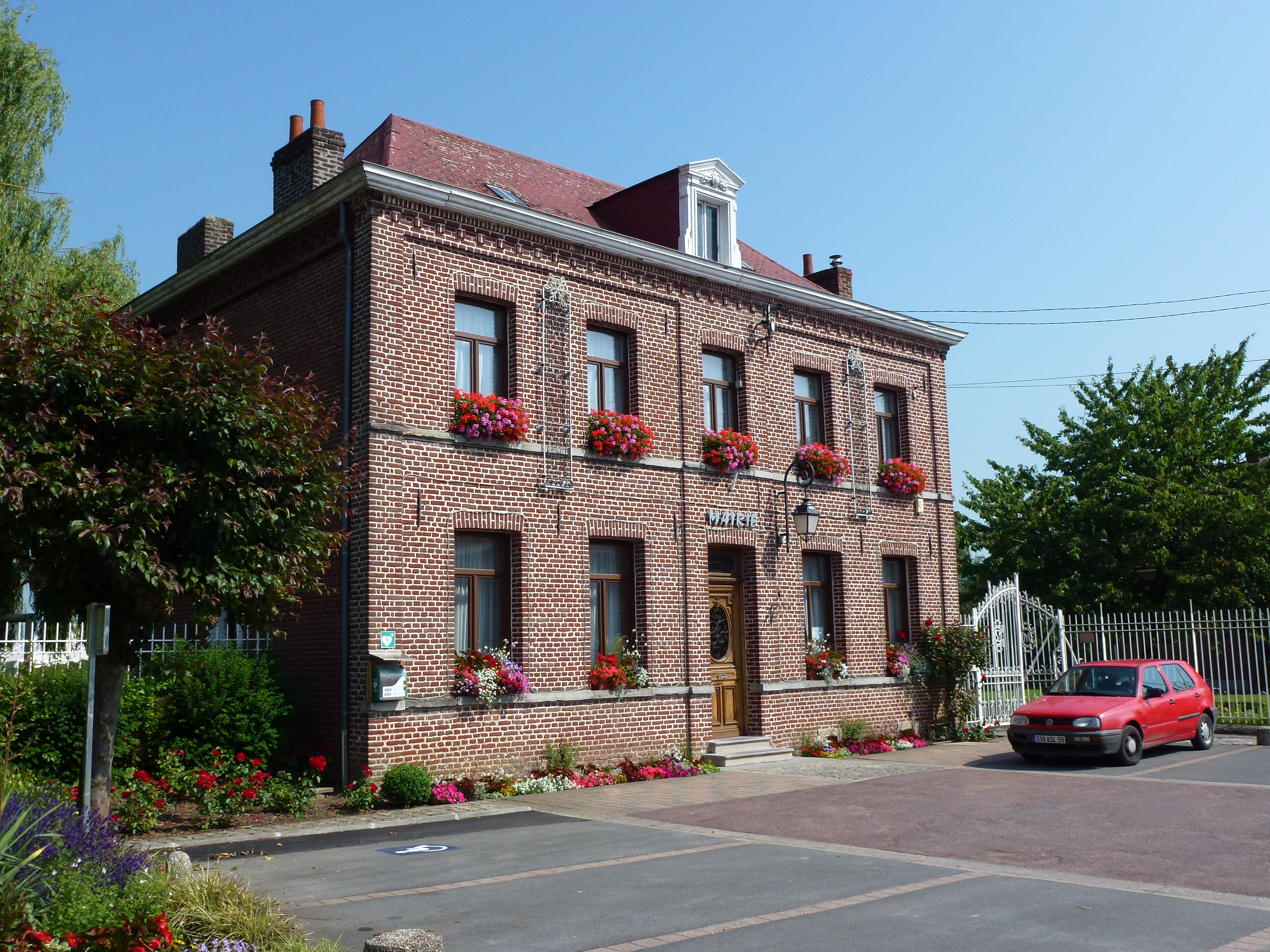
- The town hall in Brillon

- Coat of arms
- Location of Brillon
- Location within France Location within Hauts-de-France
- Coordinates: 50°26′12″N 3°19′52″E
- Country: France
- Region: Hauts-de-France
- Department: Nord
- Arrondissement: Valenciennes
- Canton: Saint-Amand-les-Eaux
- Intercommunality: CA Porte du Hainaut

Government
  - Mayor (2020–2026): Carole Leleu
- Area^{1}: 2.87 km^{2} (1.11 sq mi)
- Elevation: 20 m (66 ft)
- Highest elevation: 21 m (69 ft)
- Lowest elevation: 16 m (52 ft)
- Population (2023): 771
  - Density: 269/km^{2} (696/sq mi)
- Time zone: UTC+01:00 (CET)
  - Summer (DST): UTC+02:00 (CEST)
- INSEE/Postal code: 59109 /59178
- ^{1} French Land Register data, which excludes lakes, ponds, glaciers > 1 km^{2} (0.386 sq mi or 247 acres) and river estuaries.

Brillon is a commune in the Nord department in northern France. It is 15 km (9.3 mi) northwest of Valenciennes and 15 km (9.3 mi) northeast of Douai.

== Population ==
Historical population
Year	Pop.	±% p.a.
1968	464	—
1975	507	+1.27%
1982	535	+0.77%
1990	621	+1.88%
1999	684	+1.08%
2007	727	+0.77%
2012	738	+0.30%
2017	738	+0.00%
2023	771	+0.73%
Source: INSEE

== Heraldry ==
Arms of Brillon	The arms of Brillon are blazoned : Azure, semy de lys Or. = France Ancient (Ansacq, Brillon, Escaudain, Escautpont, Hélesmes, Hérin, Lecelles, Lieu-Saint-Amand, Lourches, Neuville-sur-Escaut, Rosult, Rumegies and Wignehies use the same arms.)

== See also ==
- Communes of the Nord department
