= Lieu-Saint-Amand =

- Commune
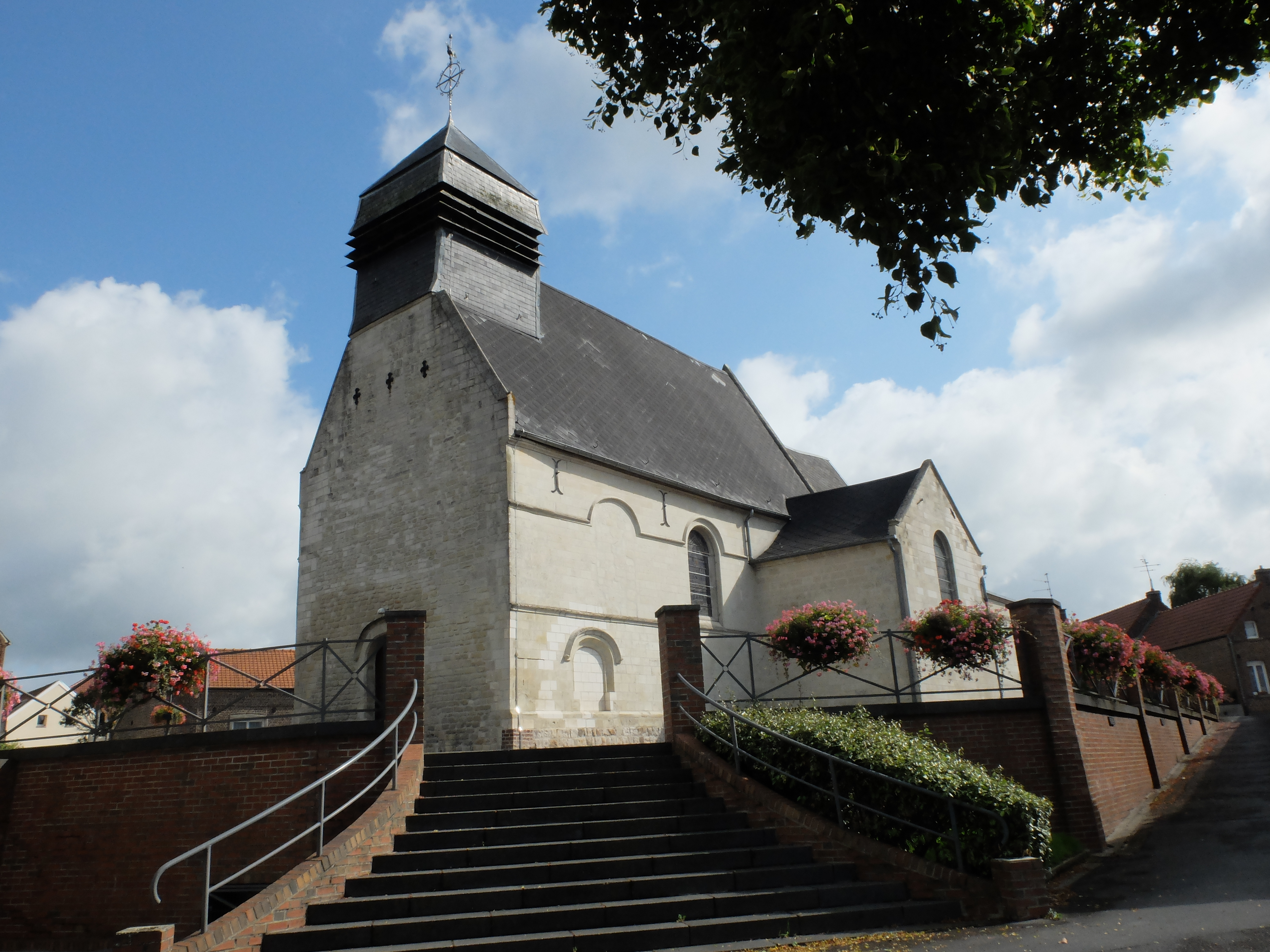
- The church in Lieu-Saint-Amand

- Coat of arms
- Location of Lieu-Saint-Amand
- Location within France Location within Hauts-de-France
- Coordinates: 50°16′26″N 3°20′46″E
- Country: France
- Region: Hauts-de-France
- Department: Nord
- Arrondissement: Valenciennes
- Canton: Denain
- Intercommunality: CA Porte du Hainaut

Government
  - Mayor (2020–2026): Jean-Michel Denhez
- Area^{1}: 5.11 km^{2} (1.97 sq mi)
- Elevation: 38 m (125 ft)
- Highest elevation: 69 m (226 ft)
- Lowest elevation: 34 m (112 ft)
- Population (2023): 1,462
  - Density: 286/km^{2} (741/sq mi)
- Time zone: UTC+01:00 (CET)
  - Summer (DST): UTC+02:00 (CEST)
- INSEE/Postal code: 59348 /59111
- ^{1} French Land Register data, which excludes lakes, ponds, glaciers > 1 km^{2} (0.386 sq mi or 247 acres) and river estuaries.

Lieu-Saint-Amand (French pronunciation: [ljø sɛ̃.t‿amɑ̃]) is a commune in the Nord department in northern France. It is the home of the Sevel Nord facility, an automobile factory which builds Fiat, Peugeot and Citroën vehicles.

== Heraldry ==
Arms of Lieu-Saint-Amand	The arms of Lieu-Saint-Amand are blazoned : Azure, semy de lys Or. = France Ancient (Ansacq, Brillon, Escaudain, Escautpont, Hélesmes, Hérin, Lecelles, Lieu-Saint-Amand, Lourches, Neuville-sur-Escaut, Rosult, Rumegies and Wignehies use the same arms.)

== See also ==
- Communes of the Nord department
