= Escaudain =

- Commune
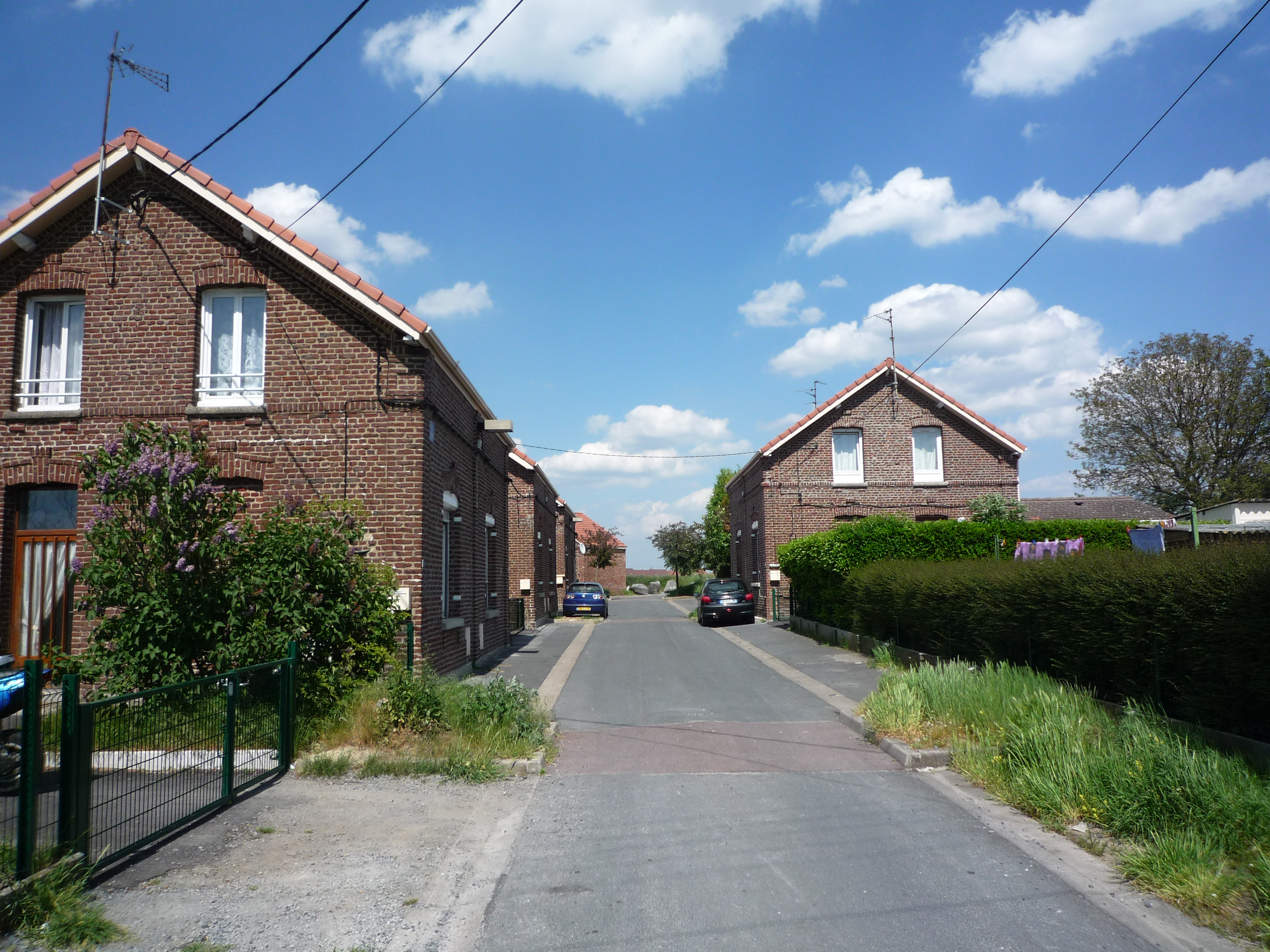
- The Cuvette mine village in Escaudain

- Coat of arms
- Location of Escaudain
- Location within France Location within Hauts-de-France
- Coordinates: 50°20′06″N 3°20′35″E
- Country: France
- Region: Hauts-de-France
- Department: Nord
- Arrondissement: Valenciennes
- Canton: Denain
- Intercommunality: CA Porte du Hainaut

Government
  - Mayor (2020–2026): Bruno Saligot
- Area^{1}: 9.97 km^{2} (3.85 sq mi)
- Elevation: 41 m (135 ft)
- Highest elevation: 51 m (167 ft)
- Lowest elevation: 31 m (102 ft)
- Population (2023): 9,039
  - Density: 907/km^{2} (2,350/sq mi)
- Time zone: UTC+01:00 (CET)
  - Summer (DST): UTC+02:00 (CEST)
- INSEE/Postal code: 59205 /59124
- ^{1} French Land Register data, which excludes lakes, ponds, glaciers > 1 km^{2} (0.386 sq mi or 247 acres) and river estuaries.

Escaudain (French pronunciation: [ekodɛ̃]; West Flemish: Schouden) is a commune in the Nord department in northern France.

== Population ==
Historical population
Year	Pop.	±% p.a.
1968	11,770	—
1975	10,673	−1.39%
1982	9,835	−1.16%
1990	9,328	−0.66%
1999	9,328	+0.00%
2007	9,053	−0.37%
2012	9,114	+0.13%
2017	9,619	+1.08%
2023	9,039	−1.03%
Source: INSEE

== Heraldry ==
Arms of Escaudain	The arms of Escaudain are blazoned : Azure, semy de lys Or. = France Ancient (Ansacq, Brillon, Escaudain, Escautpont, Hélesmes, Hérin, Lecelles, Lieu-Saint-Amand, Lourches, Neuville-sur-Escaut, Rosult, Rumegies and Wignehies use the same arms.)

== See also ==
- Communes of the Nord department
