= Hélesmes =

- Commune
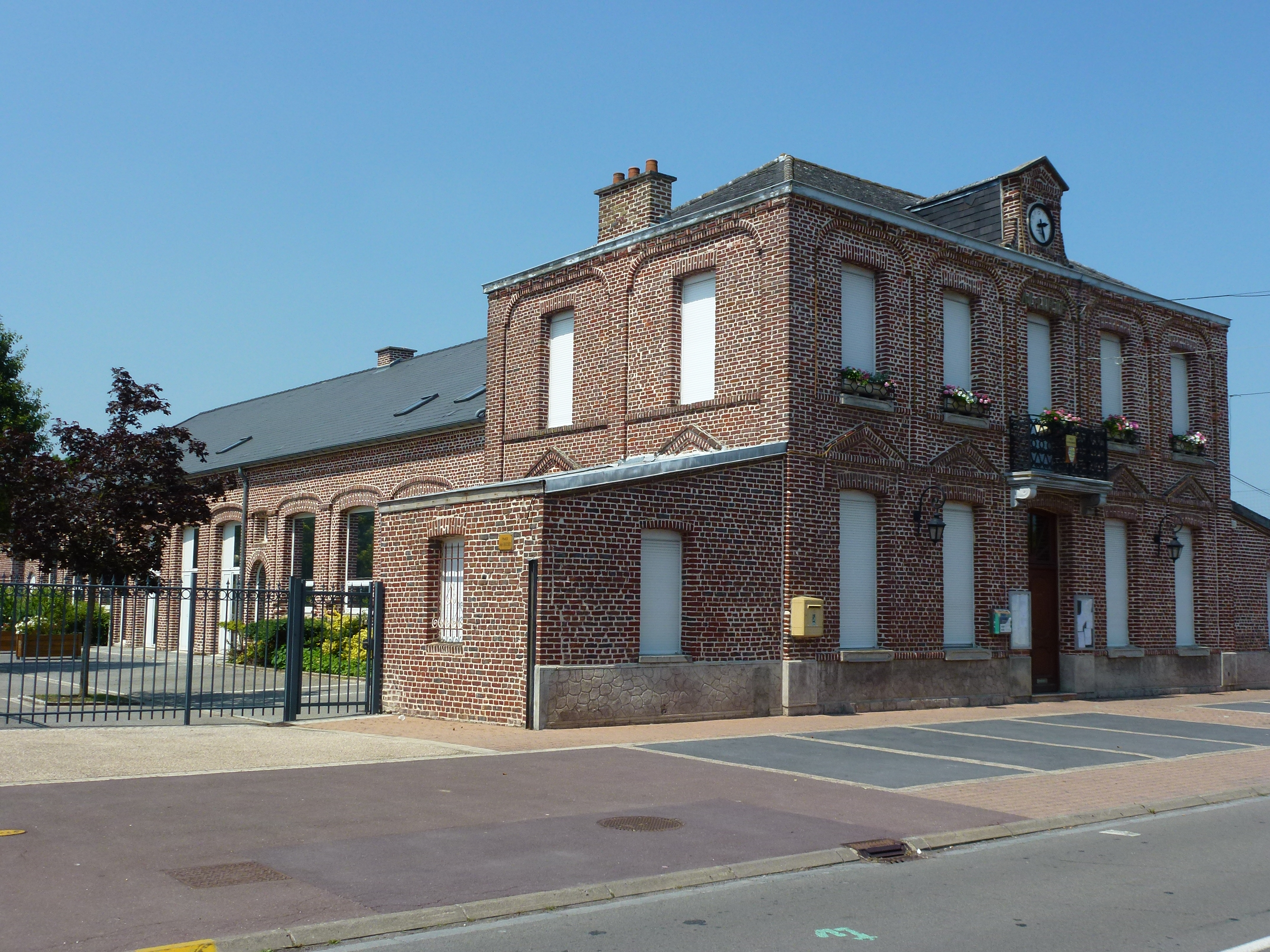
- The town hall

- Coat of arms
- Location of Hélesmes
- Location within France Location within Hauts-de-France
- Coordinates: 50°22′N 3°21′E
- Country: France
- Region: Hauts-de-France
- Department: Nord
- Arrondissement: Valenciennes
- Canton: Saint-Amand-les-Eaux
- Intercommunality: CA Porte du Hainaut

Government
  - Mayor (2020–2026): Stéphanie Hugues
- Area^{1}: 7.36 km^{2} (2.84 sq mi)
- Elevation: 19 m (62 ft)
- Highest elevation: 95 m (312 ft)
- Lowest elevation: 16 m (52 ft)
- Population (2023): 1,907
  - Density: 259/km^{2} (671/sq mi)
- Time zone: UTC+01:00 (CET)
  - Summer (DST): UTC+02:00 (CEST)
- INSEE/Postal code: 59297 /59171
- ^{1} French Land Register data, which excludes lakes, ponds, glaciers > 1 km^{2} (0.386 sq mi or 247 acres) and river estuaries.

Hélesmes (French pronunciation: [elɛm]) is a commune in the Nord department in northern France.

== Heraldry ==
| Arms of Hélesmes | The arms of Hélesmes are blazoned : Azure, semy de lys Or. = France Ancient (Ansacq, Brillon, Escaudain, Escautpont, Hélesmes, Hérin, Lecelles, Lieu-Saint-Amand, Lourches, Neuville-sur-Escaut, Rosult, Rumegies and Wignehies use the same arms.) |

== See also ==
- Communes of the Nord department
