= Rosult =

- Commune
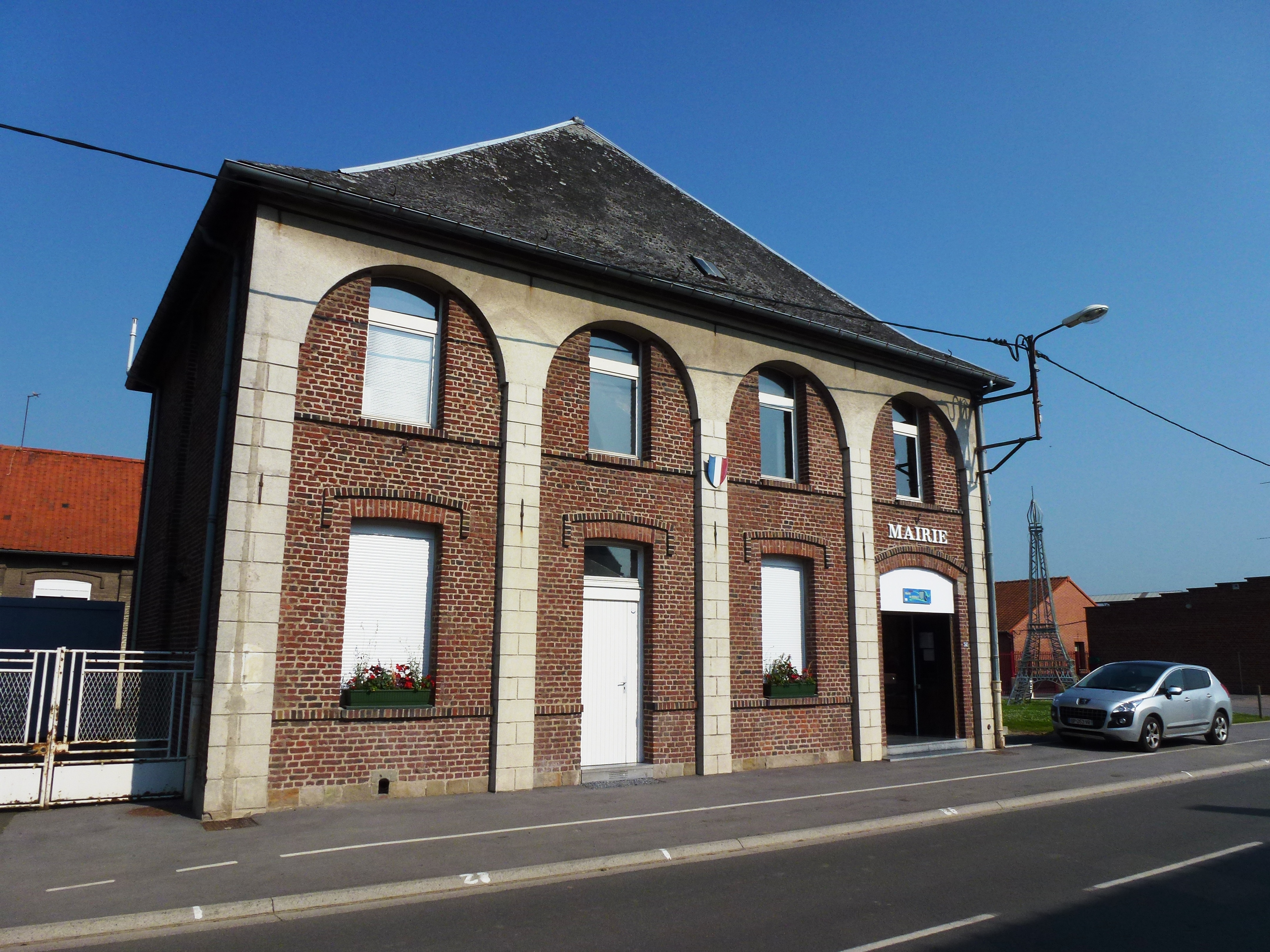
- The town hall in Rosult

- Coat of arms
- Location of Rosult
- Location within France Location within Hauts-de-France
- Coordinates: 50°26′54″N 3°21′53″E
- Country: France
- Region: Hauts-de-France
- Department: Nord
- Arrondissement: Valenciennes
- Canton: Saint-Amand-les-Eaux
- Intercommunality: CA Porte du Hainaut

Government
  - Mayor (2020–2026): Nathalie Colin
- Area^{1}: 8.16 km^{2} (3.15 sq mi)
- Elevation: 19 m (62 ft)
- Highest elevation: 21 m (69 ft)
- Lowest elevation: 15 m (49 ft)
- Population (2023): 2,022
  - Density: 248/km^{2} (642/sq mi)
- Time zone: UTC+01:00 (CET)
  - Summer (DST): UTC+02:00 (CEST)
- INSEE/Postal code: 59511 /59230
- ^{1} French Land Register data, which excludes lakes, ponds, glaciers > 1 km^{2} (0.386 sq mi or 247 acres) and river estuaries.

Rosult (French pronunciation: [ʁozy]) is a commune in the Nord department in northern France.

== Population ==
Historical population
| Year | Pop. | ±% p.a. |
|---|---|---|
| 1968 | 1,248 | — |
| 1975 | 1,287 | +0.44% |
| 1982 | 1,258 | −0.33% |
| 1990 | 1,636 | +3.34% |
| 1999 | 1,838 | +1.30% |
| 2007 | 1,876 | +0.26% |
| 2012 | 1,846 | −0.32% |
| 2017 | 1,911 | +0.69% |
| 2023 | 2,022 | +0.95% |
Source: INSEE

== Heraldry ==
| Arms of Rosult | The arms of Rosult are blazoned : Azure, semy de lys Or. = France Ancient (Ansacq, Brillon, Escaudain, Escautpont, Hélesmes, Hérin, Lecelles, Lieu-Saint-Amand, Lourches, Neuville-sur-Escaut, Rosult, Rumegies and Wignehies use the same arms.) |

== See also ==
- Communes of the Nord department
