= Wignehies =

- Commune
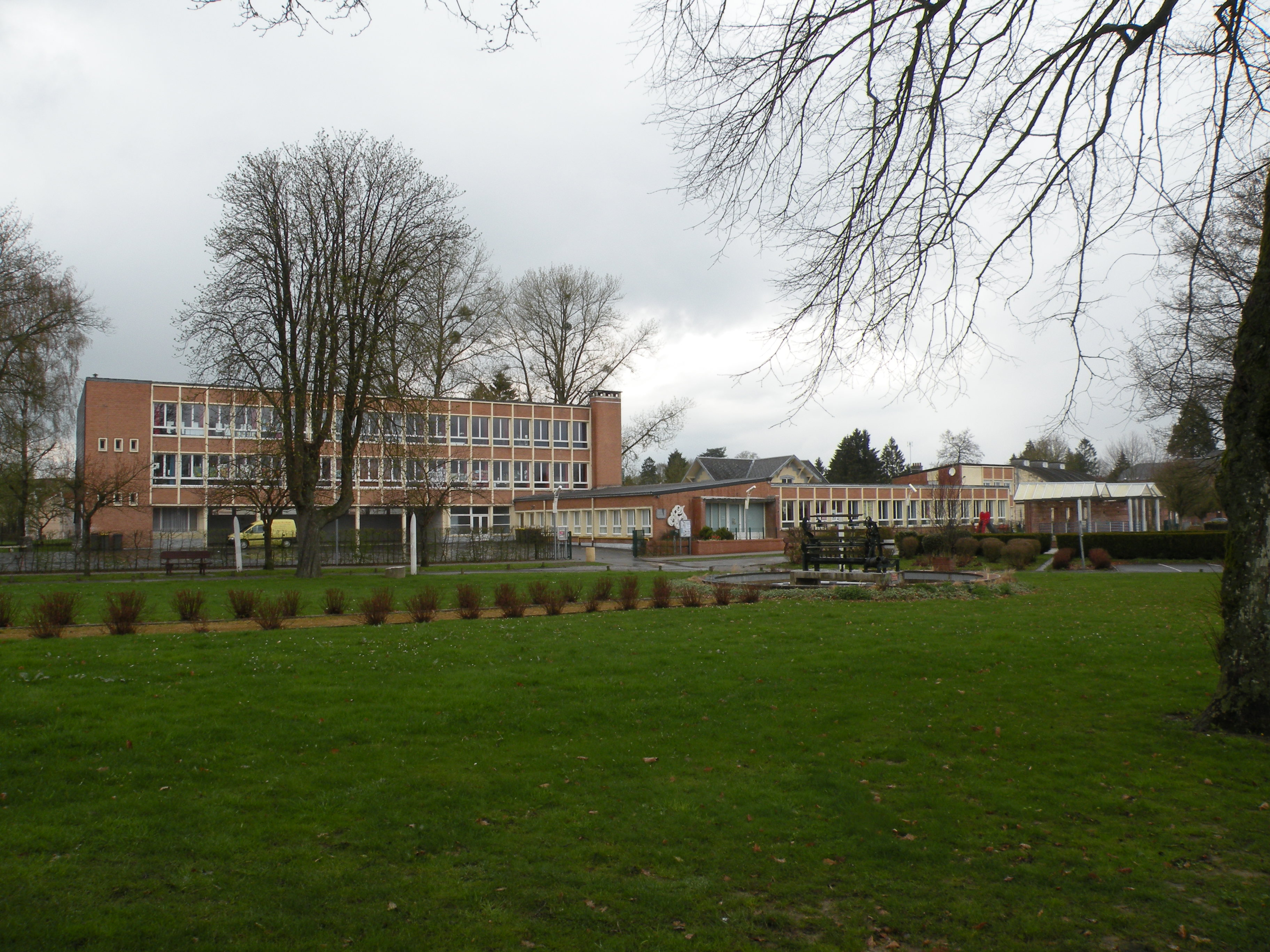
- The school in Wignehies

- Coat of arms
- Location of Wignehies
- Location within France Location within Hauts-de-France
- Coordinates: 50°01′03″N 4°00′33″E
- Country: France
- Region: Hauts-de-France
- Department: Nord
- Arrondissement: Avesnes-sur-Helpe
- Canton: Fourmies
- Intercommunality: Sud Avesnois

Government
  - Mayor (2020–2026): Jean-Guy Bertin
- Area^{1}: 13.86 km^{2} (5.35 sq mi)
- Elevation: 172 m (564 ft)
- Highest elevation: 238 m (781 ft)
- Lowest elevation: 166 m (545 ft)
- Population (2023): 2,804
  - Density: 202.3/km^{2} (524.0/sq mi)
- Time zone: UTC+01:00 (CET)
  - Summer (DST): UTC+02:00 (CEST)
- INSEE/Postal code: 59659 /59212
- ^{1} French Land Register data, which excludes lakes, ponds, glaciers > 1 km^{2} (0.386 sq mi or 247 acres) and river estuaries.

Wignehies (French pronunciation: [wiɲə.i]) is a commune in the Nord department in northern France.

== Heraldry ==
| Arms of Wignehies | The arms of Wignehies are blazoned : Azure, semy de lys Or. = France Ancient (Ansacq, Brillon, Escaudain, Escautpont, Hélesmes, Hérin, Lecelles, Lieu-Saint-Amand, Lourches, Neuville-sur-Escaut, Rosult, Rumegies and Wignehies use the same arms.) |

== Population ==
Historical population
| Year | Pop. | ±% p.a. |
|---|---|---|
| 1968 | 3,803 | — |
| 1975 | 3,798 | −0.02% |
| 1982 | 3,582 | −0.83% |
| 1990 | 3,544 | −0.13% |
| 1999 | 3,284 | −0.84% |
| 2007 | 3,153 | −0.51% |
| 2012 | 3,012 | −0.91% |
| 2017 | 2,903 | −0.73% |
| 2023 | 2,804 | −0.58% |
Source: INSEE

== See also ==
- Communes of the Nord department
