= Arrondissement of Valenciennes =

Coordinates: 50°21′N 3°31′E

Valenciennes
- Arrondissement
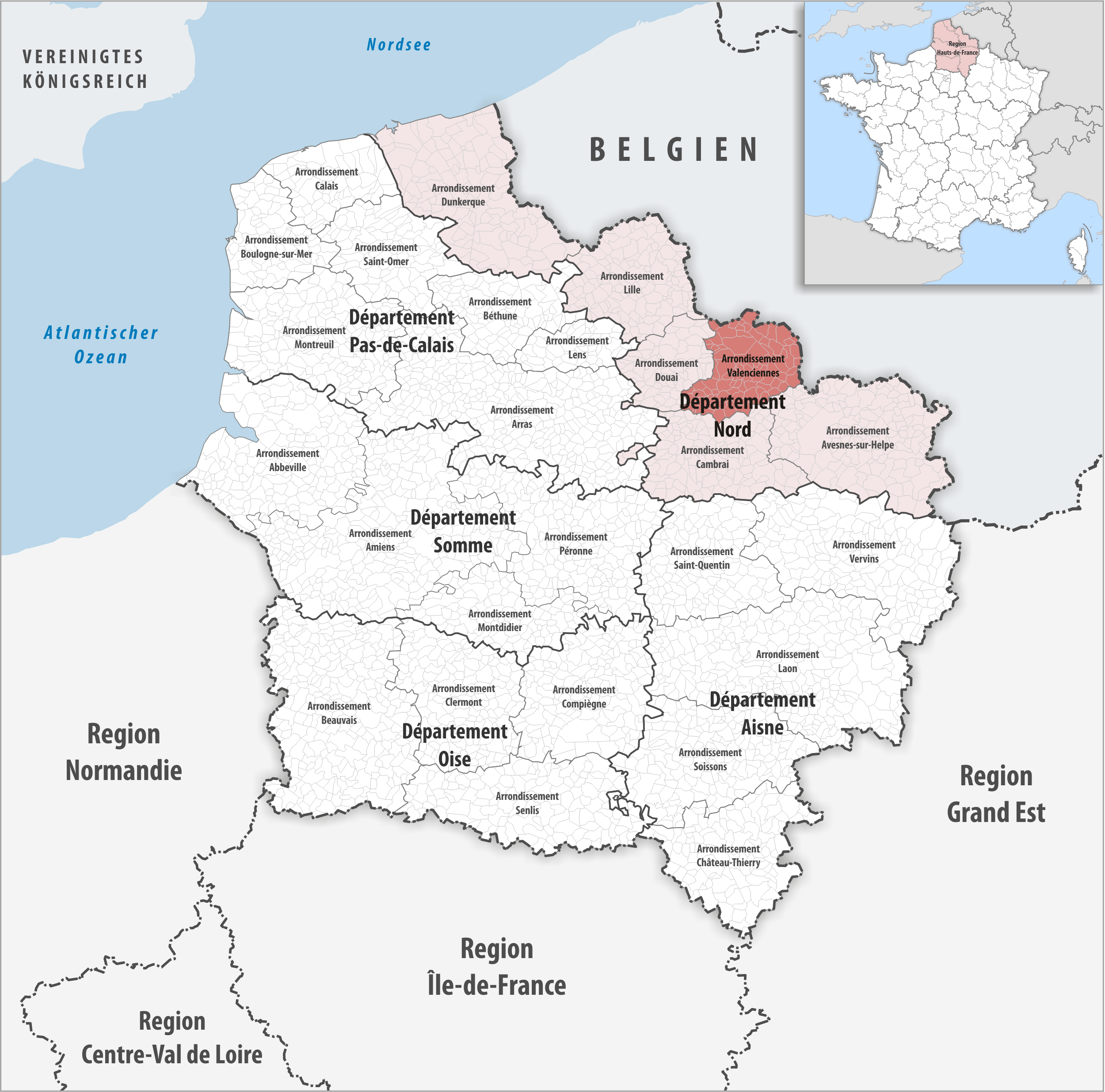
- Location within the region Hauts-de-France
- Country: France
- Region: Hauts-de-France
- Department: Nord
- No. of communes: {{{nbcomm}}}
- Area: 634.8 km^{2} (245.1 sq mi)
- Population (2023): 350,157
  - Density: 551.6/km^{2} (1,429/sq mi)
- INSEE code: 596

The arrondissement of Valenciennes is an arrondissement of France in the Nord department in the Hauts-de-France region. It has 82 communes. Its population is 350,643 (2021), and its area is 634.8 km^{2} (245.1 sq mi).

== Composition ==
The communes of the arrondissement of Valenciennes, and their INSEE codes, are:

1. Abscon (59002)
2. Anzin (59014)
3. Artres (59019)
4. Aubry-du-Hainaut (59027)
5. Aulnoy-lez-Valenciennes (59032)
6. Avesnes-le-Sec (59038)
7. Bellaing (59064)
8. Beuvrages (59079)
9. Bouchain (59092)
10. Bousignies (59100)
11. Brillon (59109)
12. Bruay-sur-l'Escaut (59112)
13. Bruille-Saint-Amand (59114)
14. Château-l'Abbaye (59144)
15. Condé-sur-l'Escaut (59153)
16. Crespin (59160)
17. Curgies (59166)
18. Denain (59172)
19. Douchy-les-Mines (59179)
20. Émerchicourt (59192)
21. Escaudain (59205)
22. Escautpont (59207)
23. Estreux (59215)
24. Famars (59221)
25. Flines-lès-Mortagne (59238)
26. Fresnes-sur-Escaut (59253)
27. Hasnon (59284)
28. Haspres (59285)
29. Haulchin (59288)
30. Haveluy (59292)
31. Hélesmes (59297)
32. Hergnies (59301)
33. Hérin (59302)
34. Hordain (59313)
35. Lecelles (59335)
36. Lieu-Saint-Amand (59348)
37. Lourches (59361)
38. Maing (59369)
39. Marly (59383)
40. Marquette-en-Ostrevant (59387)
41. Mastaing (59391)
42. Maulde (59393)
43. Millonfosse (59403)
44. Monchaux-sur-Écaillon (59407)
45. Mortagne-du-Nord (59418)
46. Neuville-sur-Escaut (59429)
47. Nivelle (59434)
48. Noyelles-sur-Selle (59440)
49. Odomez (59444)
50. Oisy (59446)
51. Onnaing (59447)
52. Petite-Forêt (59459)
53. Préseau (59471)
54. Prouvy (59475)
55. Quarouble (59479)
56. Quérénaing (59480)
57. Quiévrechain (59484)
58. Raismes (59491)
59. Rœulx (59504)
60. Rombies-et-Marchipont (59505)
61. Rosult (59511)
62. Rouvignies (59515)
63. Rumegies (59519)
64. Saint-Amand-les-Eaux (59526)
65. Saint-Aybert (59530)
66. Saint-Saulve (59544)
67. Sars-et-Rosières (59554)
68. Saultain (59557)
69. Sebourg (59559)
70. La Sentinelle (59564)
71. Thiant (59589)
72. Thivencelle (59591)
73. Thun-Saint-Amand (59594)
74. Trith-Saint-Léger (59603)
75. Valenciennes (59606)
76. Verchain-Maugré (59610)
77. Vicq (59613)
78. Vieux-Condé (59616)
79. Wallers (59632)
80. Wasnes-au-Bac (59645)
81. Wavrechain-sous-Denain (59651)
82. Wavrechain-sous-Faulx (59652)

== History ==
The arrondissement of Valenciennes was created in 1800.

As a result of the reorganisation of the cantons of France which came into effect in 2015, the borders of the cantons are no longer related to the borders of the arrondissements. The cantons of the arrondissement of Valenciennes were, as of January 2015:

1. Anzin
2. Bouchain
3. Condé-sur-l'Escaut
4. Denain
5. Saint-Amand-les-Eaux-Rive droite
6. Saint-Amand-les-Eaux-Rive gauche
7. Valenciennes-Est
8. Valenciennes-Nord
9. Valenciennes-Sud
