= Vieux-Condé =

- Commune
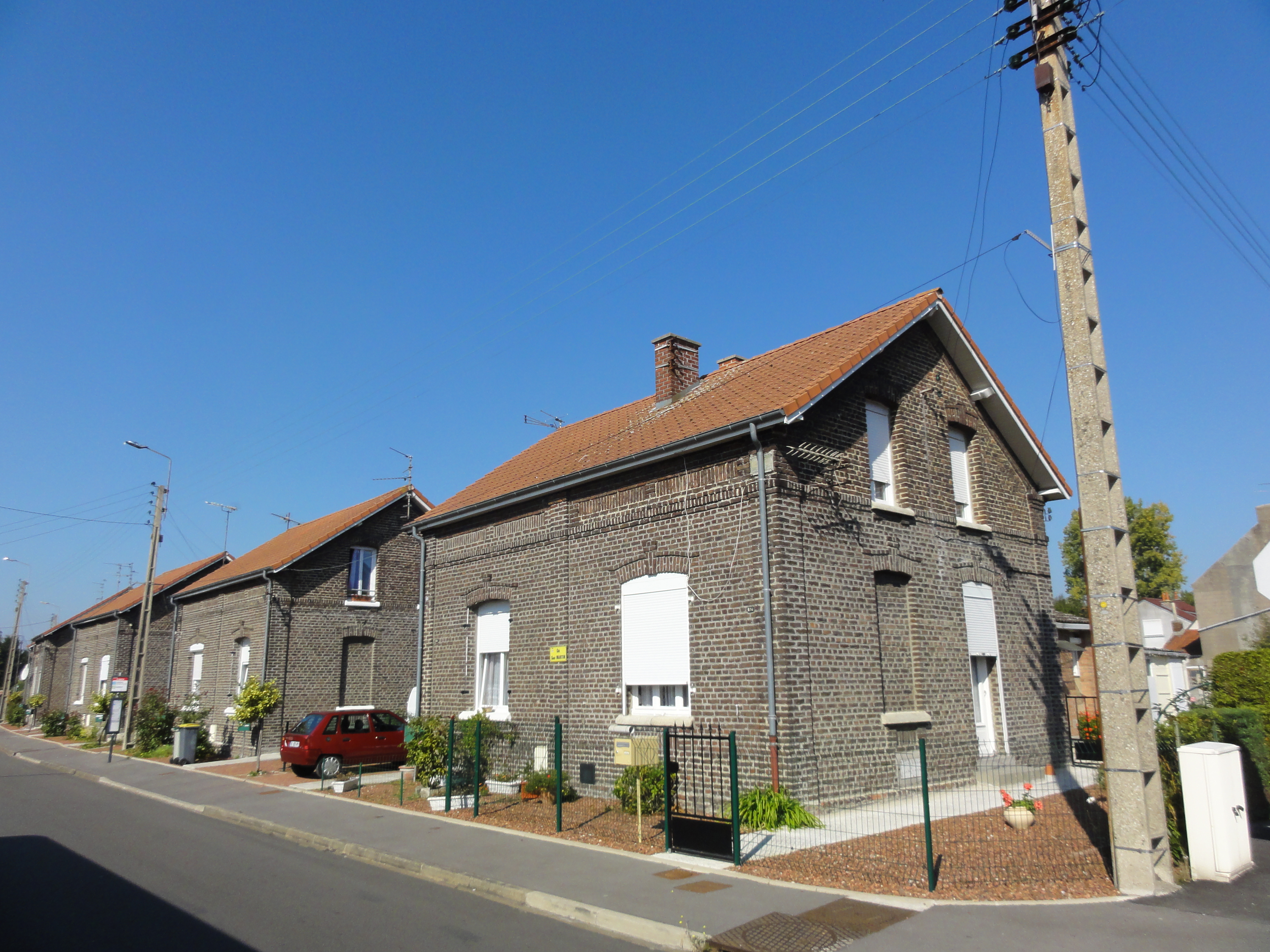
- The Martin Pit mining village of the Anzin mines

- Coat of arms
- Location of Vieux-Condé
- Location within France Location within Hauts-de-France
- Coordinates: 50°27′37″N 3°34′09″E
- Country: France
- Region: Hauts-de-France
- Department: Nord
- Arrondissement: Valenciennes
- Canton: Marly
- Intercommunality: CA Valenciennes Métropole

Government
  - Mayor (2020–2026): David Bustin
- Area^{1}: 11.06 km^{2} (4.27 sq mi)
- Elevation: 21 m (69 ft)
- Highest elevation: 51 m (167 ft)
- Lowest elevation: 13 m (43 ft)
- Population (2023): 10,617
  - Density: 959.9/km^{2} (2,486/sq mi)
- Time zone: UTC+01:00 (CET)
  - Summer (DST): UTC+02:00 (CEST)
- INSEE/Postal code: 59616 /59690
- ^{1} French Land Register data, which excludes lakes, ponds, glaciers > 1 km^{2} (0.386 sq mi or 247 acres) and river estuaries.

Vieux-Condé (French pronunciation: [vjø kɔ̃de]; Dutch: Oudkonde) is a commune in the Nord department in northern France. The village stands on a canalised section of the river Scheldt, adjacent to the northwest of Condé-sur-l'Escaut. It is part of the agglomeration (unité urbaine) of Valenciennes.

== Name ==
The name of the village was formerly simply 'Condé', which is a place-name widespread in France, deriving possibly from a Gaulish word for a confluence of rivers.

The name is found in the Anglo-Saxon Chronicle for the year 883, reporting that Vikings sailed up the Scheldt to occupy Cundoþ. It is found as Vetus Condatum in the 'cartulaire de Vicogne' of 1215 and as Vies Condet in a work by Jacques de Guise of the 14th century

As the Prince of Condé was a prominent royalist, at the French Revolution the village was renamed 'Vieux-Nord-Libre' until 1810.

== Population ==
Historical population
Year	Pop.	±% p.a.
1968	11,970	—
1975	11,514	−0.55%
1982	11,178	−0.42%
1990	10,859	−0.36%
1999	10,641	−0.23%
2007	10,724	+0.10%
2012	10,070	−1.25%
2017	10,469	+0.78%
2023	10,617	+0.23%
Source: INSEE

== Heraldry ==
Arms of Vieux-Condé	The arms of Vieux-Condé are blazoned : Argent, on a fess gules, a vivre of the field. [a vivre is a thin barrulet dancetty]

== Twinning ==
Bleicherode in Germany since 1961; also Niederzier in Germany since 1988.

== See also ==
- Communes of the Nord department
