= Obrechies =

- Commune
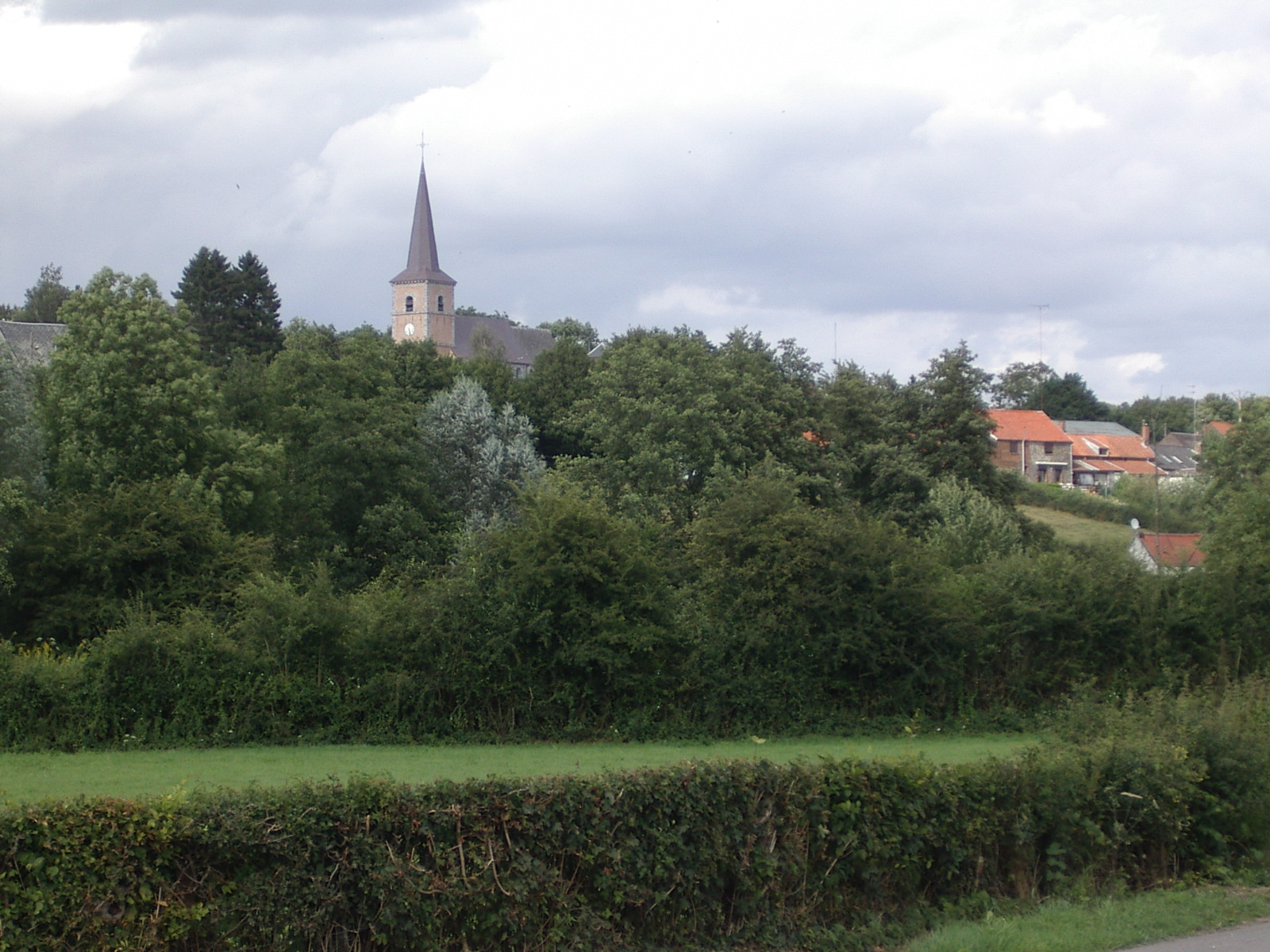
- A general view of Obrechies

- Coat of arms
- Location of Obrechies
- Location within France Location within Hauts-de-France
- Coordinates: 50°13′14″N 4°01′36″E
- Country: France
- Region: Hauts-de-France
- Department: Nord
- Arrondissement: Avesnes-sur-Helpe
- Canton: Fourmies
- Intercommunality: CA Maubeuge Val de Sambre

Government
  - Mayor (2020–2026): Michel Duveaux
- Area^{1}: 5.45 km^{2} (2.10 sq mi)
- Elevation: 175 m (574 ft)
- Highest elevation: 207 m (679 ft)
- Lowest elevation: 138 m (453 ft)
- Population (2023): 283
  - Density: 51.9/km^{2} (134/sq mi)
- Time zone: UTC+01:00 (CET)
  - Summer (DST): UTC+02:00 (CEST)
- INSEE/Postal code: 59442 /59680
- ^{1} French Land Register data, which excludes lakes, ponds, glaciers > 1 km^{2} (0.386 sq mi or 247 acres) and river estuaries.

Obrechies (French pronunciation: [ɔbʁəʃi]) is a commune in the Nord department in northern France. The river Solre flows through the commune.

== Heraldry ==
Arms of Obrechies	The arms of Obrechies are blazoned : Azure, 3 fleurs de lys Or. (France and the communes of Estreux, Obrechies use the same arms.)

== See also ==
- Communes of the Nord department
