= Estreux =

- Commune
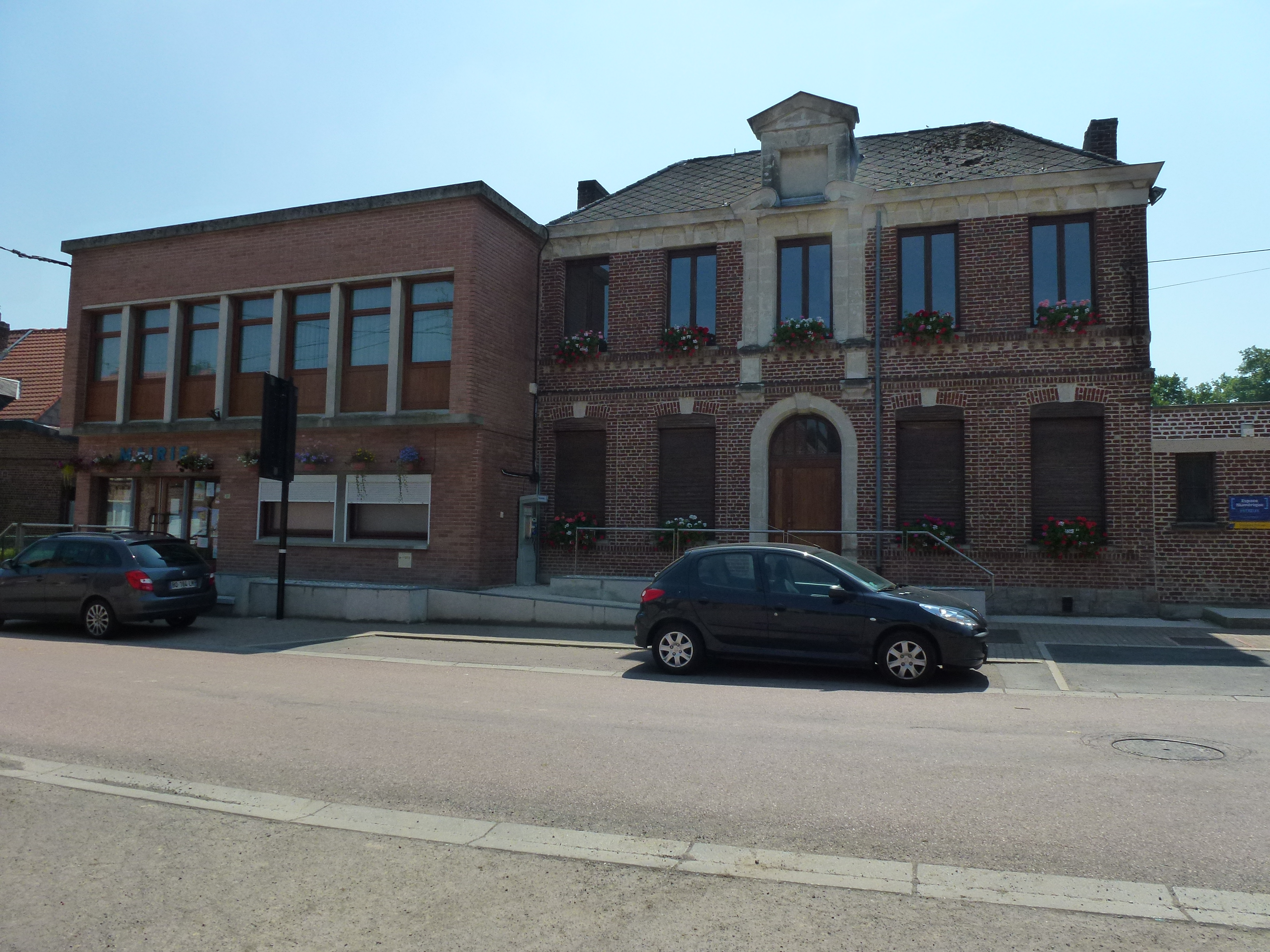
- The town hall in Estreux

- Coat of arms
- Location of Estreux
- Location within France Location within Hauts-de-France
- Coordinates: 50°21′06″N 3°35′42″E
- Country: France
- Region: Hauts-de-France
- Department: Nord
- Arrondissement: Valenciennes
- Canton: Marly
- Intercommunality: CA Valenciennes Métropole

Government
  - Mayor (2020–2026): Maurice Hennebert
- Area^{1}: 5.3 km^{2} (2.0 sq mi)
- Elevation: 67 m (220 ft)
- Highest elevation: 89 m (292 ft)
- Lowest elevation: 48 m (157 ft)
- Population (2023): 937
  - Density: 180/km^{2} (460/sq mi)
- Time zone: UTC+01:00 (CET)
  - Summer (DST): UTC+02:00 (CEST)
- INSEE/Postal code: 59215 /59990
- ^{1} French Land Register data, which excludes lakes, ponds, glaciers > 1 km^{2} (0.386 sq mi or 247 acres) and river estuaries.

Estreux (French pronunciation: [etʁø]) is a commune in the Nord department in northern France.

== Heraldry ==
Arms of Estreux	The arms of Estreux are blazoned : Azure, 3 fleurs de lys Or. (France and the communes of Estreux, Obrechies use the same arms.)

== See also ==
- Communes of the Nord department
