= Marius Dewilde =

French alledged alien contactee (1921–1996)

- Nord Éclair, 16 September 1954, announcing the encounter of Marius Dewilde.
- Born: 1921; France
- Died: 1996 (aged 74–75)
- Known for: Alleged abduction

Alleged abduction of Marius Dewilde
- Status: Single Contactee
- First abduction date: 10 September 1954
- Location: Quarouble, France
- Taken from: Home

Media
- Book: Ne résistez pas aux extra-terrestres

Marius Dewilde (1921–1996) was a French railway worker who claimed to have become a contactee for two alleged extraterrestrial life forms in 1954.

== The encounter ==
Dewilde, a railway guardian, lived in a house by the tracks close to the railway station at Quarouble, Nord, France. According to Dewilde, on the night of 10 September 1954, his dog started barking at 22:30. Dewilde initially ignored the disturbance, but went outside with a flashlight after his dog continued to bark frantically. He walked towards the tracks, and he saw an object some 6 or 7 metres (20 or 23 ft) away from him. Behind him, he could hear some steps. When he pointed the flashlight, Dewilde purportedly saw two small humanoid figures, whose height he estimated as being between 80 and 100 centimetres (31 and 39 in). When the light was pointed at their heads, he claimed it was reflected as if they were wearing mirrored helmets.

The object was reported to have suddenly emitted a beam of light that left him paralysed. He slowly looked back at the object and saw a door opening behind him. Dewilde claimed the beings boarded the craft and it took off towards the sky, changing its colours as it departed.

When he recovered from his paralysis, he attempted to tell his wife and then his neighbor of what he had just witnessed, but neither of them had seen nor heard anything. He contacted the local police, who sent officers to his home. Dewilde could not approach the area where the incident occurred, as this reportedly made him feel ill. The officers felt this lent credence to his account. Also, battery-powered objects, like Dewilde's flashlight and telephone, (Note: Some telephones from this era would have utilised batteries.) had stopped working. Before sunrise, investigators had already arrived on the scene.

== Aftermath ==
Evening Star, 19 October 1954, announcing the encounter of Marius Dewilde, and the other minor incidents that happened in the following days.

During the investigation, a very loud, anomalous noise was produced as a train passed by. A six-metre (20 ft) depression was found at the exact point where the object was said to have landed and was immediately said to have been the cause of the noise.

By the light of day, more details were uncovered: the small rocks under the train tracks were carbonized in the area of the depression. There were also some symmetric marks on the sleepers.

The encounter was made famous by the local magazine RADAR.

Following the alleged incident, there were other reported occurrences. Dewilde suffered from respiratory problems, and his dog died three days after the encounter. Three cows in nearby farms were found dead, and their autopsies reportedly revealed that their blood had been totally and inexplicably removed. Also, several local people claimed sightings of objects and beings similar to the ones witnessed by Dewilde.

== See also ==
- UFO sightings in France
- Close encounter of Cussac
