= Saultain =

- Commune
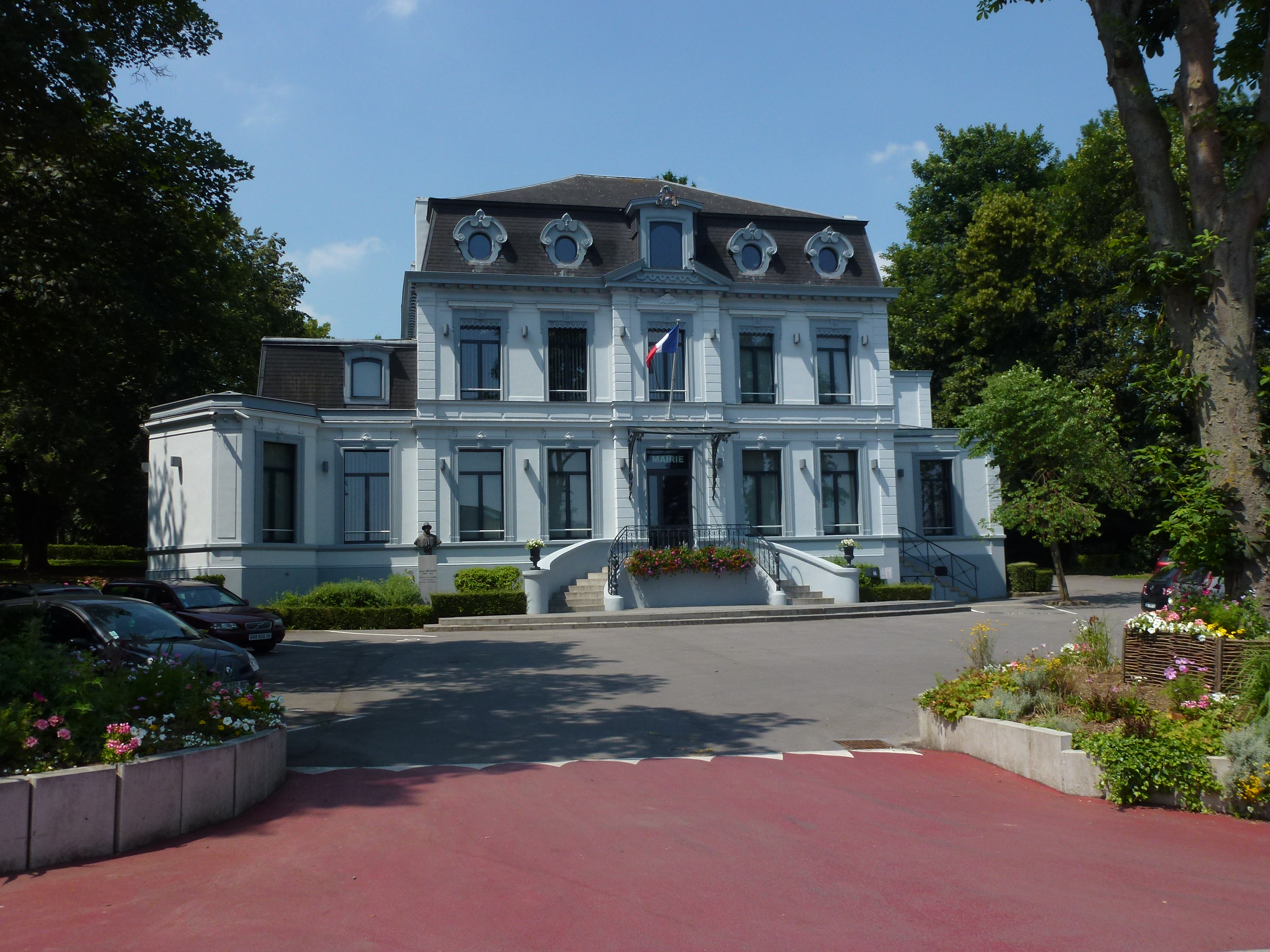
- The town hall in Saultain

- Coat of arms
- Location of Saultain
- Location within France Location within Hauts-de-France
- Coordinates: 50°20′17″N 3°34′34″E
- Country: France
- Region: Hauts-de-France
- Department: Nord
- Arrondissement: Valenciennes
- Canton: Marly
- Intercommunality: CA Valenciennes Métropole

Government
  - Mayor (2020–2026): Joël Soigneux
- Area^{1}: 6.45 km^{2} (2.49 sq mi)
- Elevation: 70 m (230 ft)
- Highest elevation: 95 m (312 ft)
- Lowest elevation: 50 m (160 ft)
- Population (2023): 2,499
  - Density: 387/km^{2} (1,000/sq mi)
- Time zone: UTC+01:00 (CET)
  - Summer (DST): UTC+02:00 (CEST)
- INSEE/Postal code: 59557 /59990
- ^{1} French Land Register data, which excludes lakes, ponds, glaciers > 1 km^{2} (0.386 sq mi or 247 acres) and river estuaries.

Saultain (French pronunciation: [soltɛ̃]) is a commune in the Nord department in northern France.

== Population ==
Historical population
Year	Pop.	±% p.a.
1968	1,423	—
1975	1,438	+0.15%
1982	1,669	+2.15%
1990	2,037	+2.52%
1999	2,077	+0.22%
2007	1,979	−0.60%
2012	2,100	+1.19%
2017	2,398	+2.69%
2023	2,499	+0.69%
Source: INSEE

== Heraldry ==
Arms of Saultain	The arms of Saultain are blazoned : Bendy argent and gules. (La Flamengrie, Fournes-en-Weppes and Wargnies-le-Grand use the same arms.)

== See also ==
- Communes of the Nord department
