= Sebourg =

- Commune
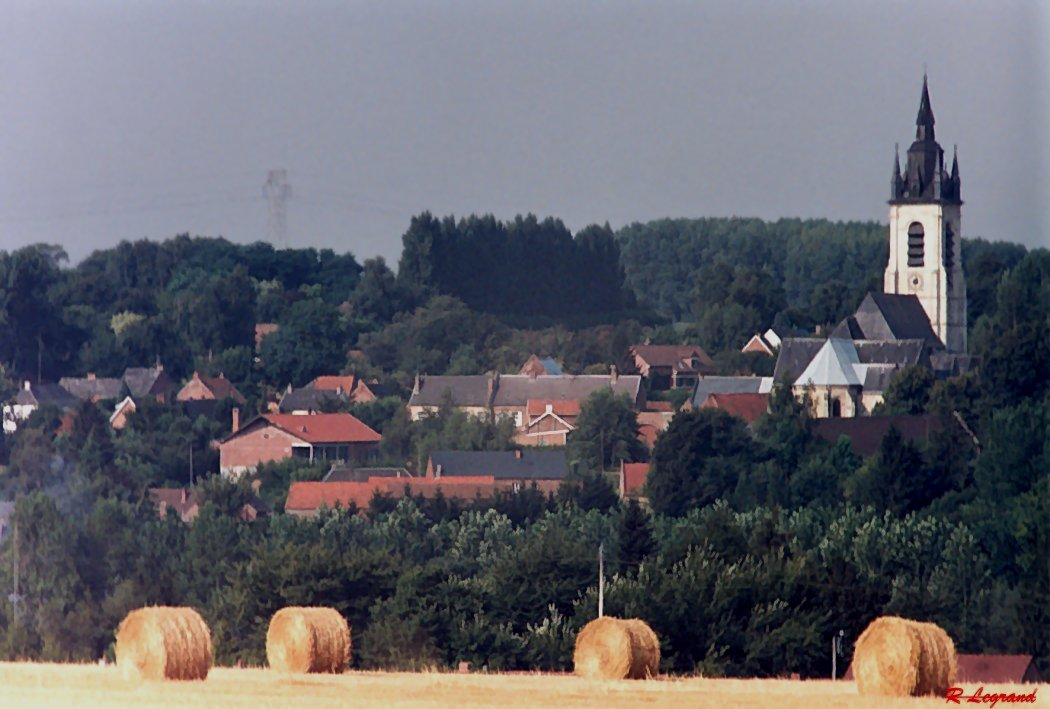
- A general view of Sebourg

- Coat of arms
- Location of Sebourg
- Location within France Location within Hauts-de-France
- Coordinates: 50°20′35″N 3°38′51″E
- Country: France
- Region: Hauts-de-France
- Department: Nord
- Arrondissement: Valenciennes
- Canton: Marly
- Intercommunality: CA Valenciennes Métropole

Government
  - Mayor (2020–2026): Bruno Cellier
- Area^{1}: 14.23 km^{2} (5.49 sq mi)
- Elevation: 50 m (160 ft)
- Highest elevation: 102 m (335 ft)
- Lowest elevation: 35 m (115 ft)
- Population (2023): 1,967
  - Density: 138.2/km^{2} (358.0/sq mi)
- Time zone: UTC+01:00 (CET)
  - Summer (DST): UTC+02:00 (CEST)
- INSEE/Postal code: 59559 /59990
- ^{1} French Land Register data, which excludes lakes, ponds, glaciers > 1 km^{2} (0.386 sq mi or 247 acres) and river estuaries.

Sebourg (French pronunciation: [səbuʁ]) is a commune in the Nord department in northern France.

== Heraldry ==
Arms of Sebourg	The arms of Sebourg are blazoned : Azure, 3 eagles' heads erased argent.

== See also ==
- Communes of the Nord department
