= Beuvrages =

- Commune
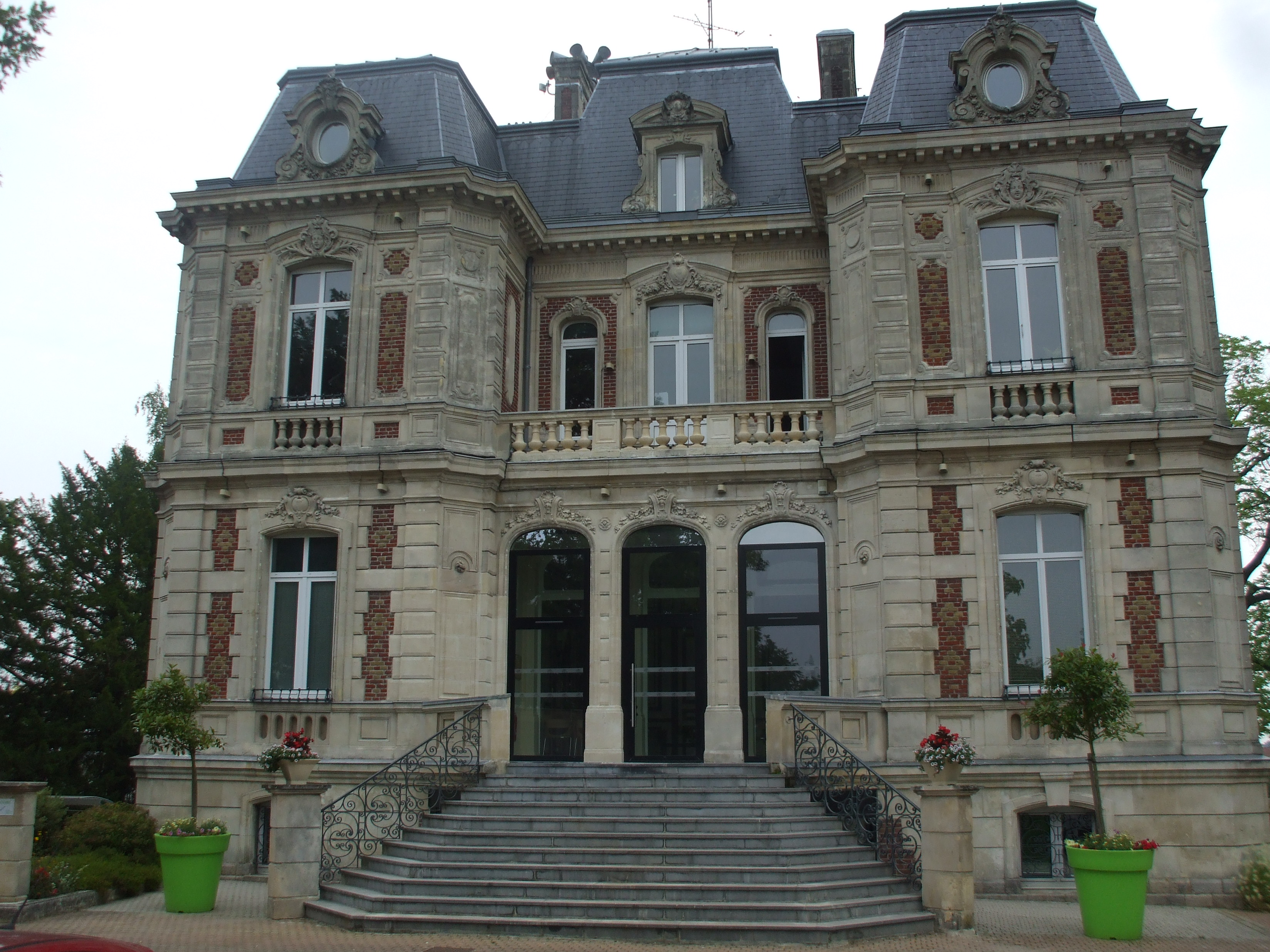
- The town hall in Beuvrages

- Coat of arms
- Location of Beuvrages
- Location within France Location within Hauts-de-France
- Coordinates: 50°23′12″N 3°30′23″E
- Country: France
- Region: Hauts-de-France
- Department: Nord
- Arrondissement: Valenciennes
- Canton: Anzin
- Intercommunality: CA Valenciennes Métropole

Government
  - Mayor (2020–2026): Ali Benyahia
- Area^{1}: 3 km^{2} (1.2 sq mi)
- Elevation: 23 m (75 ft)
- Highest elevation: 34 m (112 ft)
- Lowest elevation: 18 m (59 ft)
- Population (2023): 6,796
  - Density: 2,300/km^{2} (5,900/sq mi)
- Time zone: UTC+01:00 (CET)
  - Summer (DST): UTC+02:00 (CEST)
- INSEE/Postal code: 59079 /59192
- ^{1} French Land Register data, which excludes lakes, ponds, glaciers > 1 km^{2} (0.386 sq mi or 247 acres) and river estuaries.

Beuvrages (French pronunciation: [bøvʁaʒ]) is a commune in the Nord department in northern France.

== Population ==
Historical population

Year	Pop.	±% p.a.
1800	702	—
1806	681	−0.50%
1821	751	+0.65%
1831	865	+1.42%
1836	870	+0.12%
1841	950	+1.77%
1846	1,043	+1.89%
1851	1,128	+1.58%
1856	1,195	+1.16%
1861	1,303	+1.75%
1866	1,380	+1.15%
1872	1,400	+0.24%
1876	1,448	+0.85%
1881	1,513	+0.88%
1886	1,526	+0.17%
1891	1,677	+1.91%
1896	1,651	−0.31%
1901	1,740	+1.06%

Year	Pop.	±% p.a.
1906	1,760	+0.23%
1911	2,125	+3.84%
1921	2,121	−0.02%
1926	2,315	+1.77%
1931	2,698	+3.11%
1936	2,888	+1.37%
1946	2,918	+0.10%
1954	3,236	+1.30%
1962	4,718	+4.83%
1968	8,042	+9.30%
1975	8,485	+0.77%
1982	8,560	+0.13%
1990	8,042	−0.78%
1999	7,673	−0.52%
2007	6,986	−1.17%
2012	6,696	−0.84%
2017	6,740	+0.13%
2023	6,796	+0.14%

Source: EHESS and INSEE (1968-2023)

== Heraldry ==
Arms of Beuvrages	The arms of Beuvrages are blazoned : Quarterly 1&4: Azure, in bend sinister 3 arrows bendwise Or; 2&3: Bendy argent and gules.

== See also ==
- Communes of the Nord department
