= Rouvignies =

- Commune
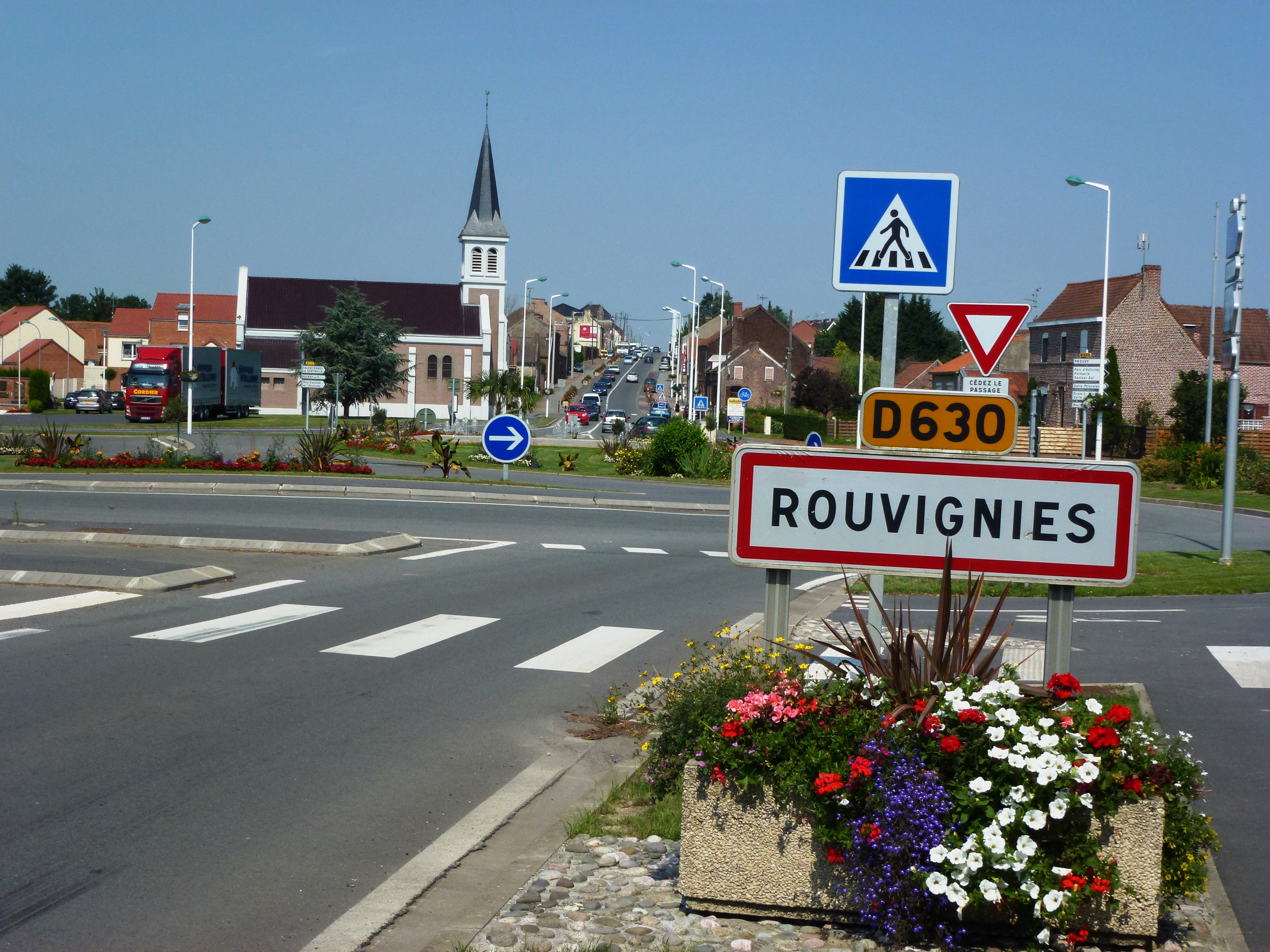
- The road into Rouvignies

- Coat of arms
- Location of Rouvignies
- Location within France Location within Hauts-de-France
- Coordinates: 50°19′37″N 3°26′28″E
- Country: France
- Region: Hauts-de-France
- Department: Nord
- Arrondissement: Valenciennes
- Canton: Aulnoy-lez-Valenciennes
- Intercommunality: CA Valenciennes Métropole

Government
  - Mayor (2020–2026): Michel Raout
- Area^{1}: 3.23 km^{2} (1.25 sq mi)
- Elevation: 20 m (66 ft)
- Highest elevation: 53 m (174 ft)
- Lowest elevation: 25 m (82 ft)
- Population (2023): 655
  - Density: 203/km^{2} (525/sq mi)
- Time zone: UTC+01:00 (CET)
  - Summer (DST): UTC+02:00 (CEST)
- INSEE/Postal code: 59515 /59220
- ^{1} French Land Register data, which excludes lakes, ponds, glaciers > 1 km^{2} (0.386 sq mi or 247 acres) and river estuaries.

Rouvignies (French pronunciation: [ʁuviɲi]) is a commune in the Nord department in northern France.

== See also ==
- Communes of the Nord department
