= Odomez =

- Commune
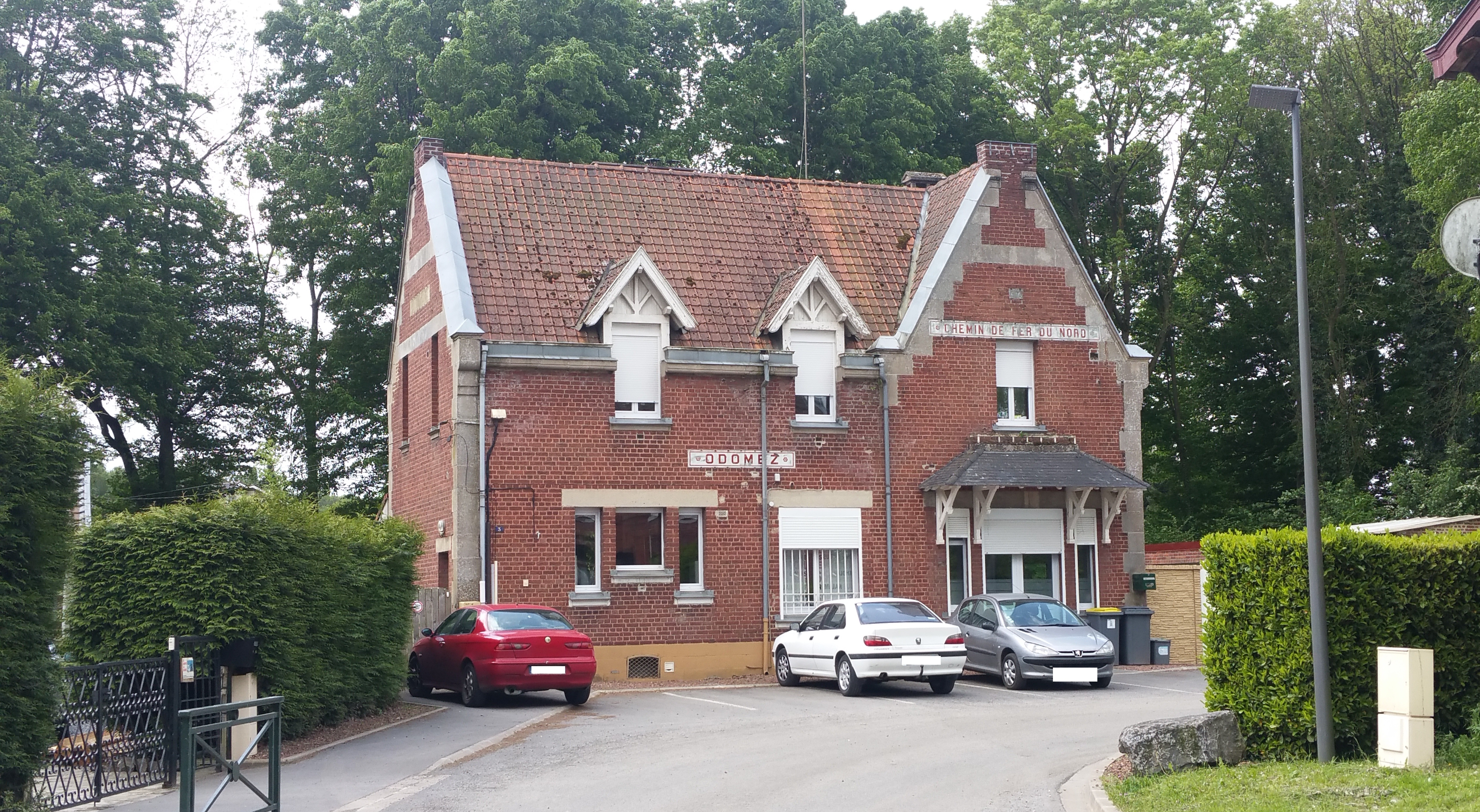
- The old railway station in Odomez

- Coat of arms
- Location of Odomez
- Location within France Location within Hauts-de-France
- Coordinates: 50°27′22″N 3°32′18″E
- Country: France
- Region: Hauts-de-France
- Department: Nord
- Arrondissement: Valenciennes
- Canton: Marly
- Intercommunality: CA Valenciennes Métropole

Government
  - Mayor (2020–2026): Joël Girondon
- Area^{1}: 4.87 km^{2} (1.88 sq mi)
- Elevation: 20 m (66 ft)
- Highest elevation: 41 m (135 ft)
- Lowest elevation: 14 m (46 ft)
- Population (2023): 945
  - Density: 194/km^{2} (503/sq mi)
- Time zone: UTC+01:00 (CET)
  - Summer (DST): UTC+02:00 (CEST)
- INSEE/Postal code: 59444 /59970
- ^{1} French Land Register data, which excludes lakes, ponds, glaciers > 1 km^{2} (0.386 sq mi or 247 acres) and river estuaries.

Odomez is a commune in the Nord department in northern France.

== Heraldry ==
Arms of Odomez	The arms of Odomez are blazoned : Gules, a unicorn sejant argent. (Monceau-Saint-Waast and Odomez use the same arms.)

== See also ==
- Communes of the Nord department
