= Thivencelle =

- Commune
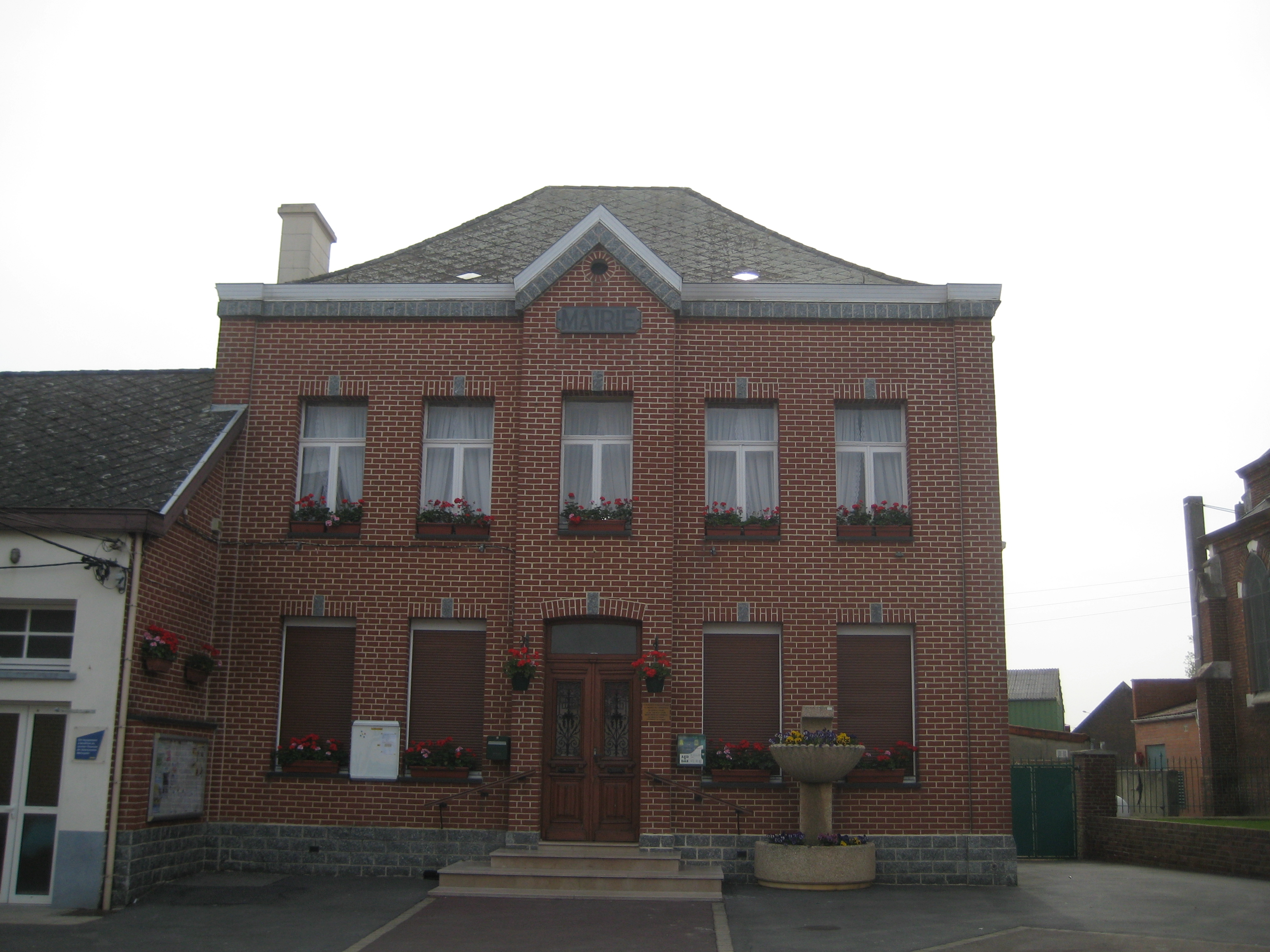
- The town hall in Thivencelle

- Coat of arms
- Location of Thivencelle
- Location within France Location within Hauts-de-France
- Coordinates: 50°26′31″N 3°38′13″E
- Country: France
- Region: Hauts-de-France
- Department: Nord
- Arrondissement: Valenciennes
- Canton: Marly
- Intercommunality: CA Valenciennes Métropole

Government
  - Mayor (2020–2026): José Dubrulle
- Area^{1}: 4.03 km^{2} (1.56 sq mi)
- Elevation: 21 m (69 ft)
- Highest elevation: 19 m (62 ft)
- Lowest elevation: 13 m (43 ft)
- Population (2023): 817
  - Density: 203/km^{2} (525/sq mi)
- Time zone: UTC+01:00 (CET)
  - Summer (DST): UTC+02:00 (CEST)
- INSEE/Postal code: 59591 /59163
- ^{1} French Land Register data, which excludes lakes, ponds, glaciers > 1 km^{2} (0.386 sq mi or 247 acres) and river estuaries.

Thivencelle (French pronunciation: [tivɑ̃sɛl]) is a commune in the Nord department in northern France.

== Heraldry ==
Arms of Thivencelle	The arms of Thivencelle are blazoned : Gules, a rose argent ?seeded? Or.

== See also ==
- Communes of the Nord department
