= Quiévrechain =

- Commune
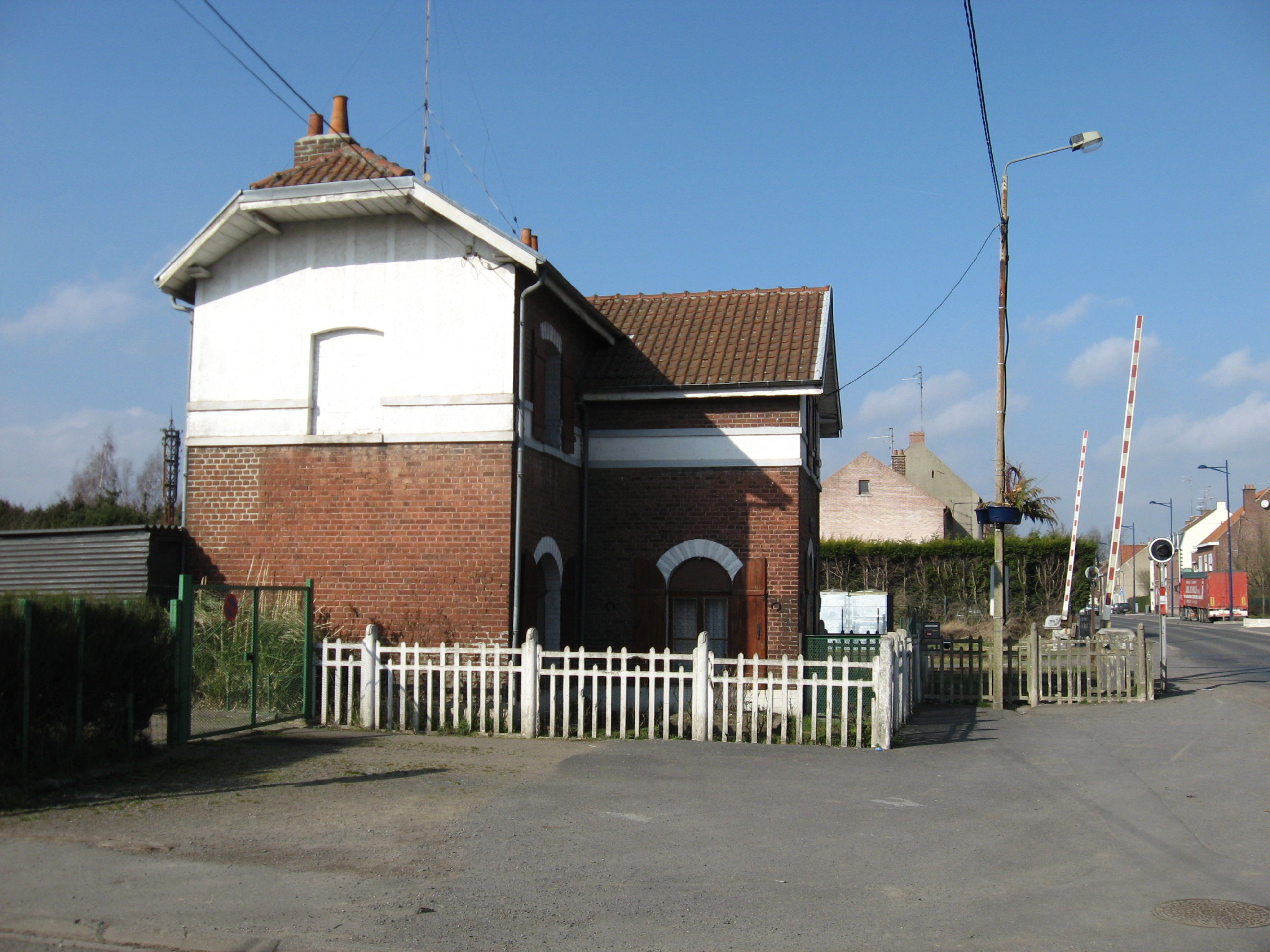
- Former train station and border crossing

- Coat of arms
- Location of Quiévrechain
- Location within France Location within Hauts-de-France
- Coordinates: 50°23′46″N 3°40′04″E
- Country: France
- Region: Hauts-de-France
- Department: Nord
- Arrondissement: Valenciennes
- Canton: Marly
- Intercommunality: CA Valenciennes Métropole

Government
  - Mayor (2020–2026): Pierre Griner
- Area^{1}: 4.71 km^{2} (1.82 sq mi)
- Elevation: 30 m (98 ft)
- Highest elevation: 118 m (387 ft)
- Lowest elevation: 24 m (79 ft)
- Population (2023): 5,949
  - Density: 1,260/km^{2} (3,270/sq mi)
- Time zone: UTC+01:00 (CET)
  - Summer (DST): UTC+02:00 (CEST)
- INSEE/Postal code: 59484 /59920
- ^{1} French Land Register data, which excludes lakes, ponds, glaciers > 1 km^{2} (0.386 sq mi or 247 acres) and river estuaries.

Quiévrechain (French pronunciation: [kjevʁəʃɛ̃]) is a commune in the Nord department in northern France.

Quiévrechain is a border town, located 15 kilometres (9.3 mi) northeast of Valenciennes and 20 km (12 mi) from Mons, Belgium. Opposite is its Belgian sister town of Quiévrain.

== Population ==
Historical population

Year	Pop.	±% p.a.
1800	549	—
1806	443	−3.51%
1821	528	+1.18%
1831	672	+2.44%
1836	739	+1.92%
1841	786	+1.24%
1846	893	+2.59%
1851	888	−0.11%
1856	885	−0.07%
1861	988	+2.23%
1866	1,062	+1.46%
1872	1,076	+0.22%
1876	1,214	+3.06%
1881	1,262	+0.78%
1886	1,401	+2.11%
1891	1,791	+5.03%
1896	2,155	+3.77%
1901	2,763	+5.10%

Year	Pop.	±% p.a.
1906	3,558	+5.19%
1911	3,556	−0.01%
1921	3,604	+0.13%
1926	4,912	+6.39%
1931	6,282	+5.04%
1936	5,632	−2.16%
1946	5,487	−0.26%
1954	6,108	+1.35%
1962	6,332	+0.45%
1968	7,102	+1.93%
1975	7,269	+0.33%
1982	7,186	−0.16%
1990	6,456	−1.33%
1999	6,069	−0.68%
2007	5,705	−0.77%
2012	6,263	+1.88%
2017	6,366	+0.33%
2023	5,949	−1.12%

Source: EHESS and INSEE (1968–2023)

== See also ==
- Communes of the Nord department
