= Communauté d'agglomération Valenciennes Métropole =

Valenciennes Métropole
- Communauté d'agglomération

- Location within the department
- Coordinates: 50°22′N 3°31′E
- Country: France
- Region: Hauts-de-France
- Department: Nord
- No. of communes: {{{nbcomm}}}
- Established: 2000
- Area: 263.5 km^{2} (101.7 sq mi)
- Population (2018): 192,787
  - Density: 731.6/km^{2} (1,895/sq mi)

Communauté d'agglomération Valenciennes Métropole is the communauté d'agglomération, an intercommunal structure, centred on the city of Valenciennes. It is located in the Nord department, in the Hauts-de-France region, northern France. It was created in December 2000. Its area is 263.5 km^{2}. Its population was 192,787 in 2018, of which 43,405 in Valenciennes proper.

== History ==
The agglomeration community of Valenciennes Métropole was created by a prefectural decree of December 22, 2000 which took effect on December 31, 2000 by the merger of communauté de communes de la vallée de l'Escaut, communauté de communes du Pays de Condé and syndicat intercommunal à vocation Multiple (SIVOM) de Trith-Saint-Léger et environs.

On January 1, 2005, the commune of Escautpont left the intercommunality to join the Communauté d'agglomération de la Porte du Hainaut.

== Composition ==
The communauté d'agglomération consists of the following 35 communes:

1. Anzin
2. Artres
3. Aubry-du-Hainaut
4. Aulnoy-lez-Valenciennes
5. Beuvrages
6. Bruay-sur-l'Escaut
7. Condé-sur-l'Escaut
8. Crespin
9. Curgies
10. Estreux
11. Famars
12. Fresnes-sur-Escaut
13. Hergnies
14. Maing
15. Marly
16. Monchaux-sur-Écaillon
17. Odomez
18. Onnaing
19. Petite-Forêt
20. Préseau
21. Prouvy
22. Quarouble
23. Quérénaing
24. Quiévrechain
25. Rombies-et-Marchipont
26. Rouvignies
27. Saint-Aybert
28. Saint-Saulve
29. Saultain
30. Sebourg
31. Thivencelle
32. Valenciennes
33. Verchain-Maugré
34. Vicq
35. Vieux-Condé
