= Crespin, Nord =

Crespin
- Commune
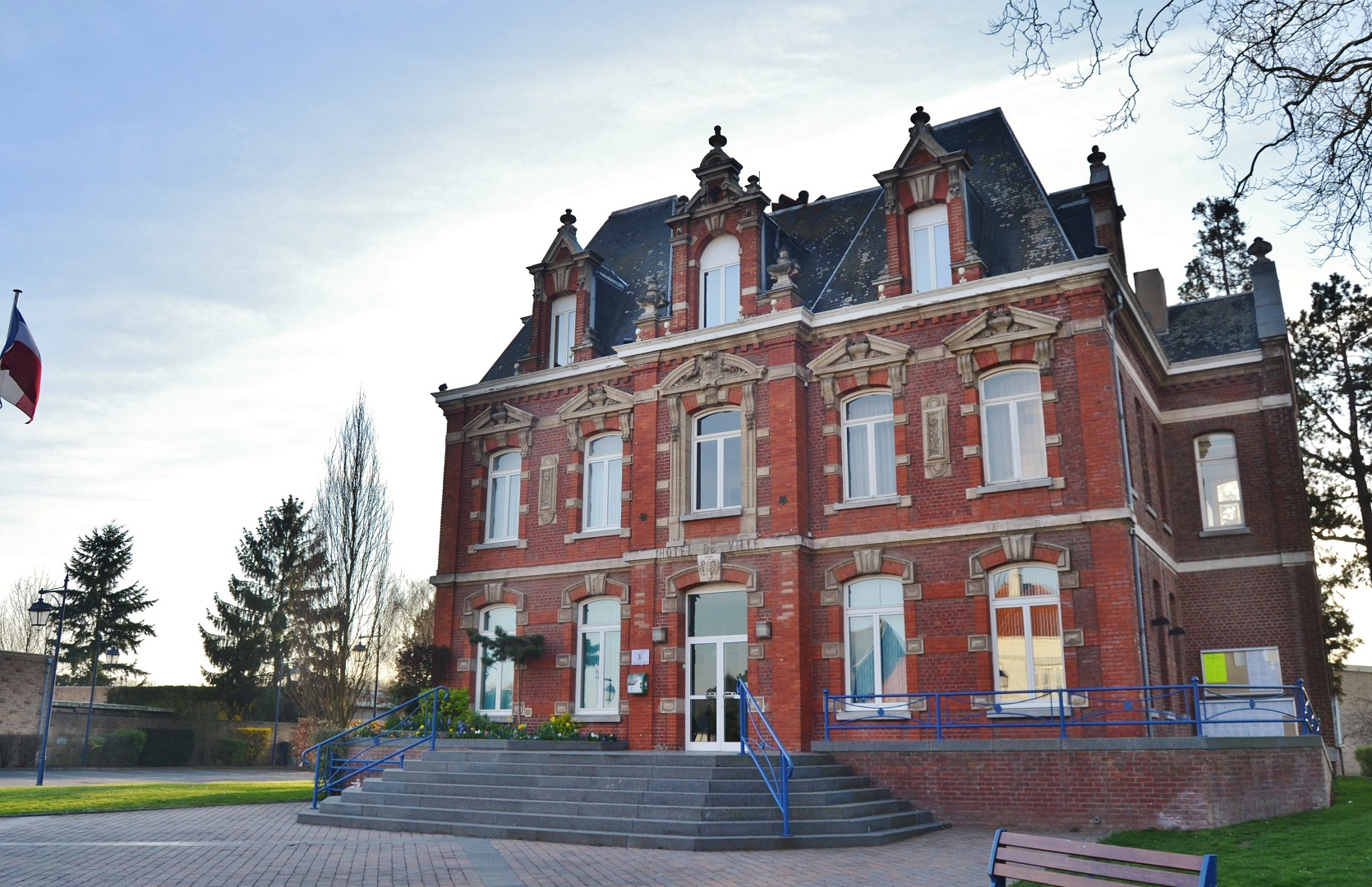
- The town hall

- Coat of arms
- Location of Crespin
- Location within France Location within Hauts-de-France
- Coordinates: 50°25′15″N 3°39′44″E
- Country: France
- Region: Hauts-de-France
- Department: Nord
- Arrondissement: Valenciennes
- Canton: Marly
- Intercommunality: CA Valenciennes Métropole

Government
  - Mayor (2021–2026): Philippe Golinval
- Area^{1}: 9.94 km^{2} (3.84 sq mi)
- Elevation: 25 m (82 ft)
- Highest elevation: 32 m (105 ft)
- Lowest elevation: 16 m (52 ft)
- Population (2023): 4,532
  - Density: 456/km^{2} (1,180/sq mi)
- Time zone: UTC+01:00 (CET)
  - Summer (DST): UTC+02:00 (CEST)
- INSEE/Postal code: 59160 /59154
- ^{1} French Land Register data, which excludes lakes, ponds, glaciers > 1 km^{2} (0.386 sq mi or 247 acres) and river estuaries.

Crespin (French pronunciation: [kʁepɛ̃]) is a commune in the Nord department in northern France. The town of Crespin was founded in 648 with the building of the Crespin Abbey by Saint Landelin.

== Population ==
Historical population
Year	Pop.	±% p.a.
1968	5,033	—
1975	5,320	+0.80%
1982	4,910	−1.14%
1990	4,553	−0.94%
1999	4,410	−0.35%
2007	4,394	−0.05%
2012	4,494	+0.45%
2017	4,532	+0.17%
2023	4,532	+0.00%
Source: INSEE

== Heraldry ==
Arms of Crespin	The arms of Crespin are blazoned : Azure, fretty argent.

== See also ==
- Communes of the Nord department
