= Émerchicourt =

- Commune
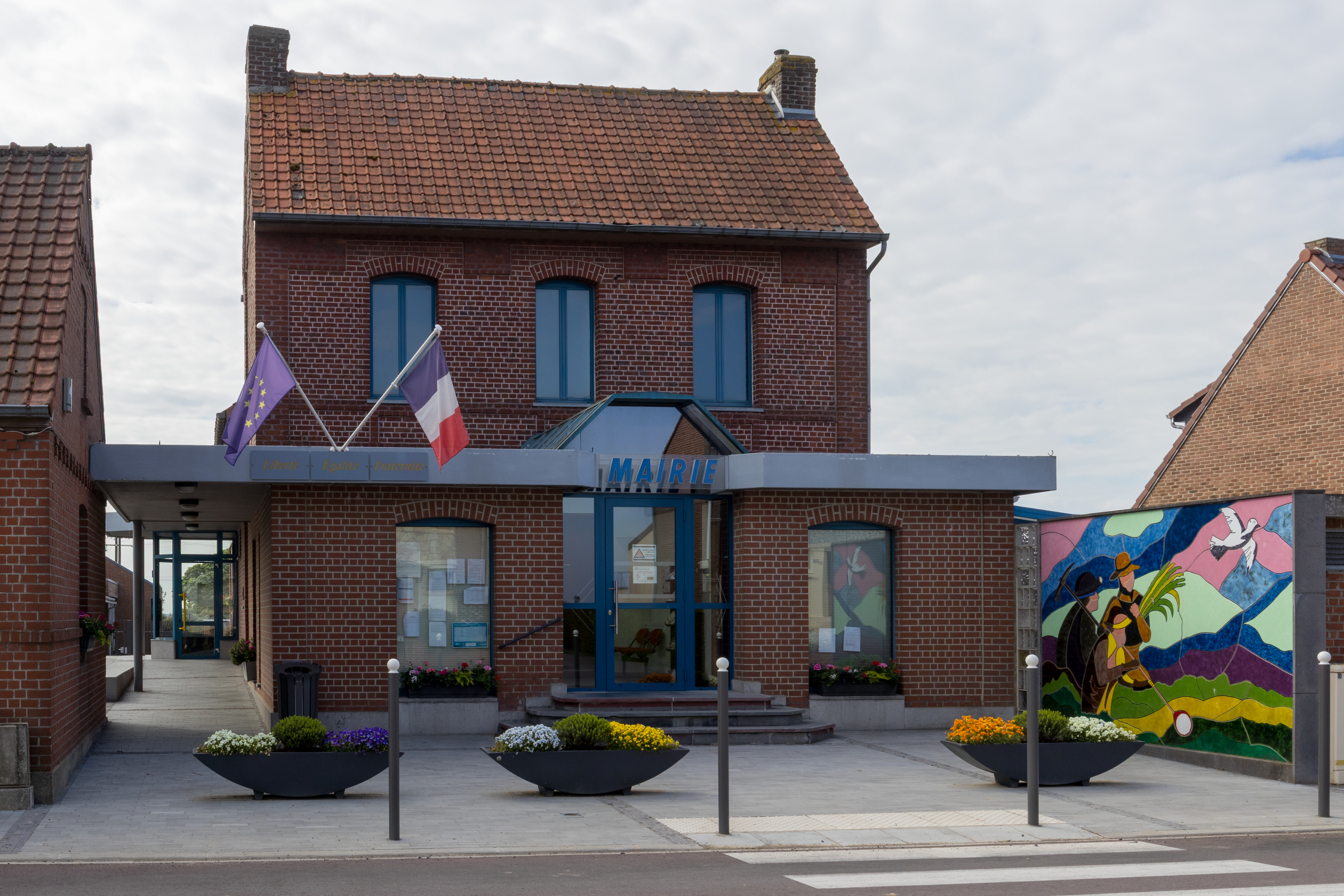
- Town hall

- Coat of arms
- Location of Émerchicourt
- Location within France Location within Hauts-de-France
- Coordinates: 50°18′32″N 3°14′41″E
- Country: France
- Region: Hauts-de-France
- Department: Nord
- Arrondissement: Valenciennes
- Canton: Denain
- Intercommunality: CA Porte du Hainaut

Government
  - Mayor (2020–2026): Régis Roussel
- Area^{1}: 5.11 km^{2} (1.97 sq mi)
- Elevation: 67 m (220 ft)
- Highest elevation: 71 m (233 ft)
- Lowest elevation: 51 m (167 ft)
- Population (2023): 804
  - Density: 157/km^{2} (408/sq mi)
- Time zone: UTC+01:00 (CET)
  - Summer (DST): UTC+02:00 (CEST)
- INSEE/Postal code: 59192 /59580
- ^{1} French Land Register data, which excludes lakes, ponds, glaciers > 1 km^{2} (0.386 sq mi or 247 acres) and river estuaries.

Émerchicourt (French pronunciation: [emɛʁʃikuʁ]) is a commune in the Nord department in northern France.

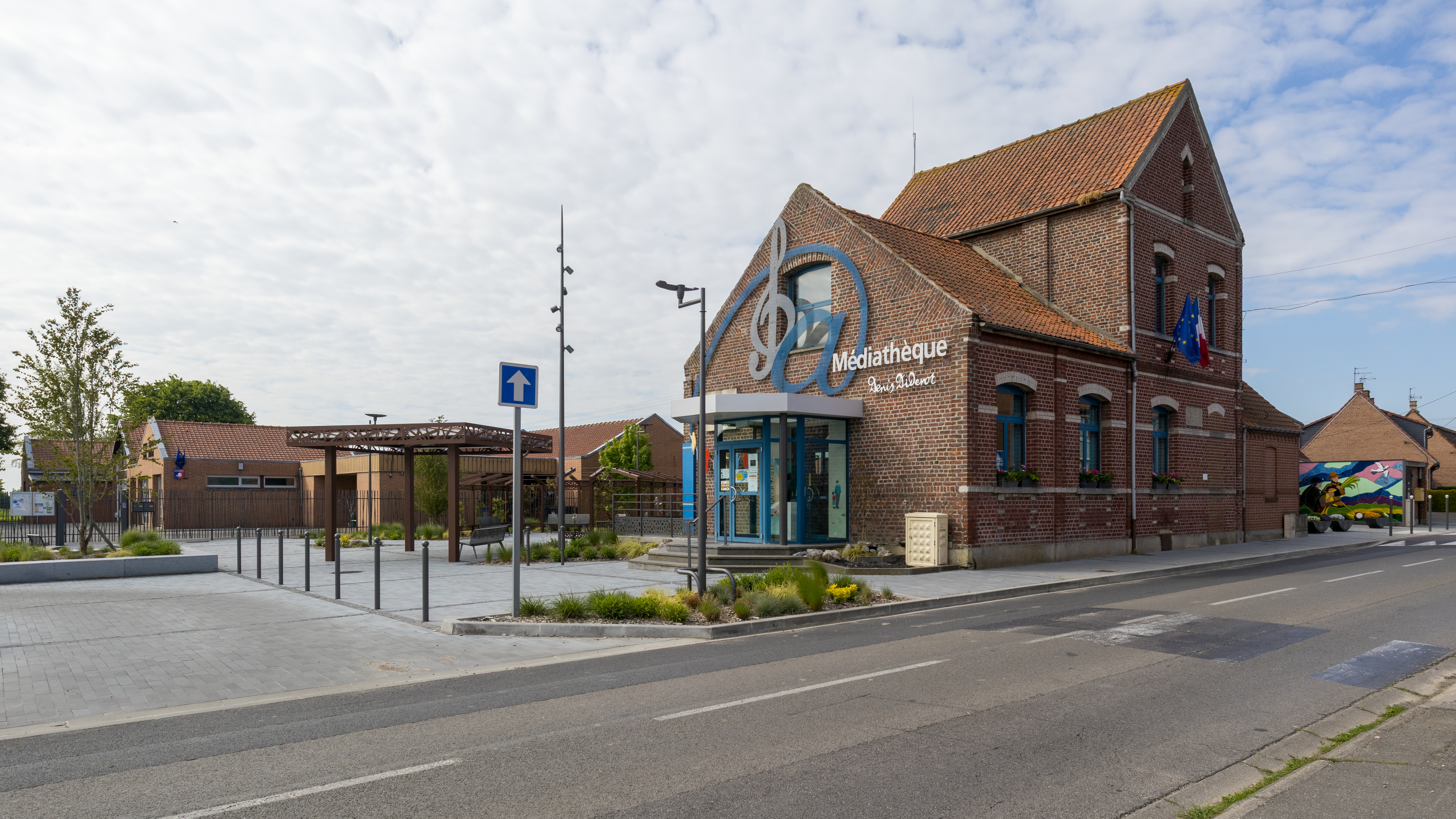
The library

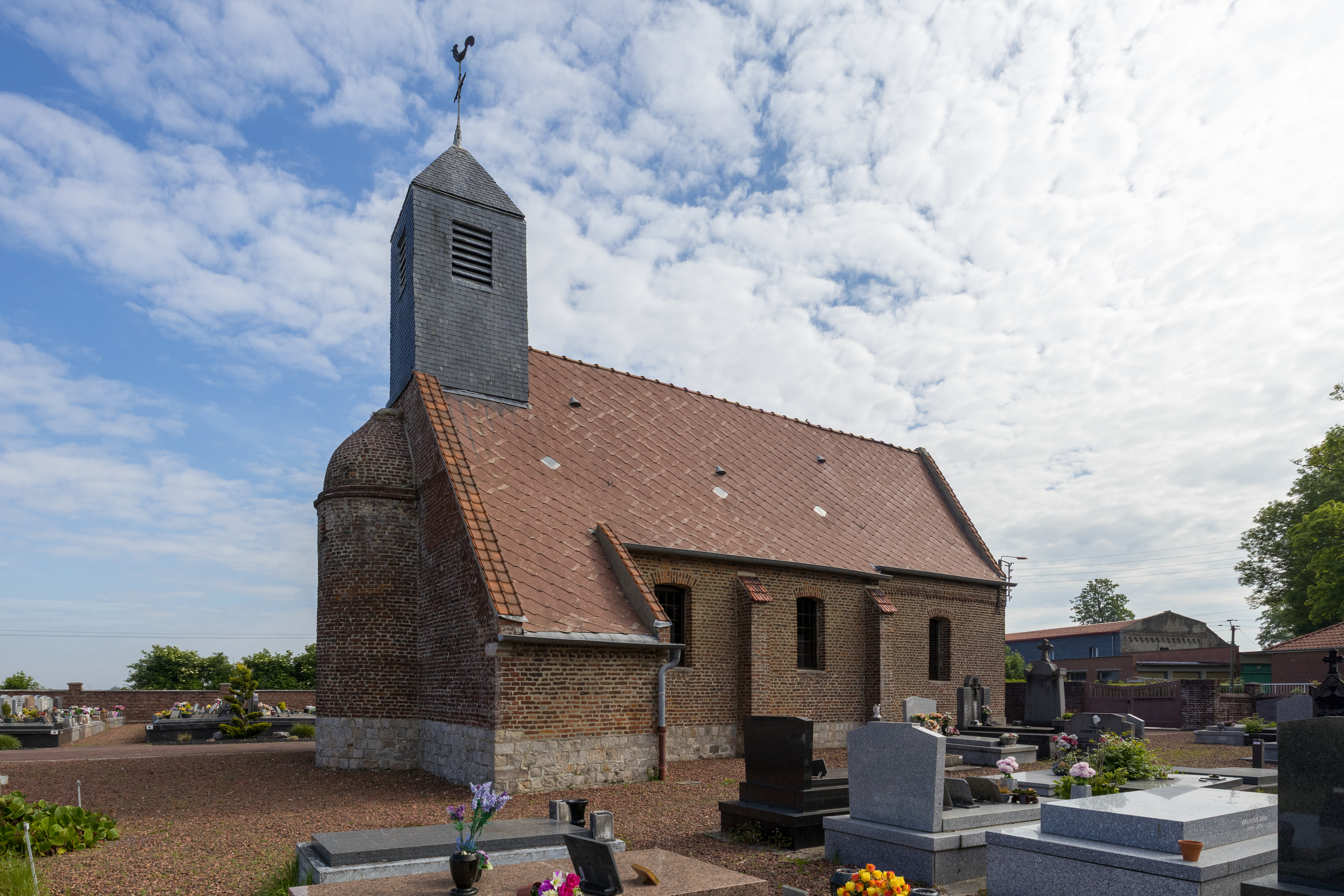
The church

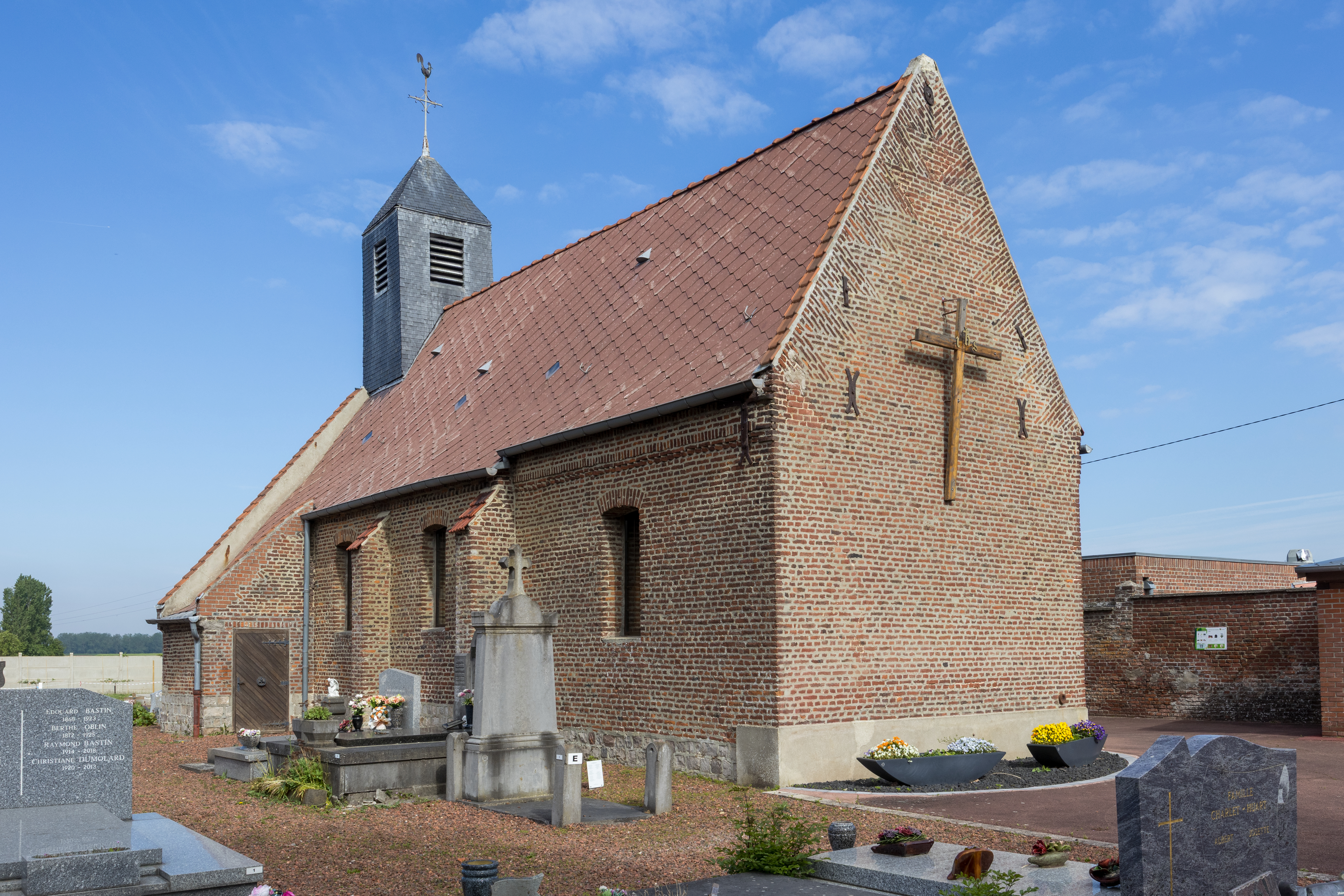

== Heraldry ==
Arms of Émerchicourt	The arms of Émerchicourt are blazoned : Argent, a sow passant sable on a base vert. (Curgies and Émerchicourt use the same arms.)

== See also ==
- Communes of the Nord department
