= Canton of Marly =

Coordinates: 50.34°N 3.55°E

The canton of Marly is an administrative division of the Nord department, northern France. It was created at the French canton reorganisation which came into effect in March 2015. Its seat is in Marly.

It consists of the following communes:

1. Condé-sur-l'Escaut
2. Crespin
3. Curgies
4. Estreux
5. Hergnies
6. Marly
7. Odomez
8. Préseau
9. Quarouble
10. Quiévrechain
11. Rombies-et-Marchipont
12. Saint-Aybert
13. Saultain
14. Sebourg
15. Thivencelle
16. Vicq
17. Vieux-Condé
