= Quarouble =

- Commune
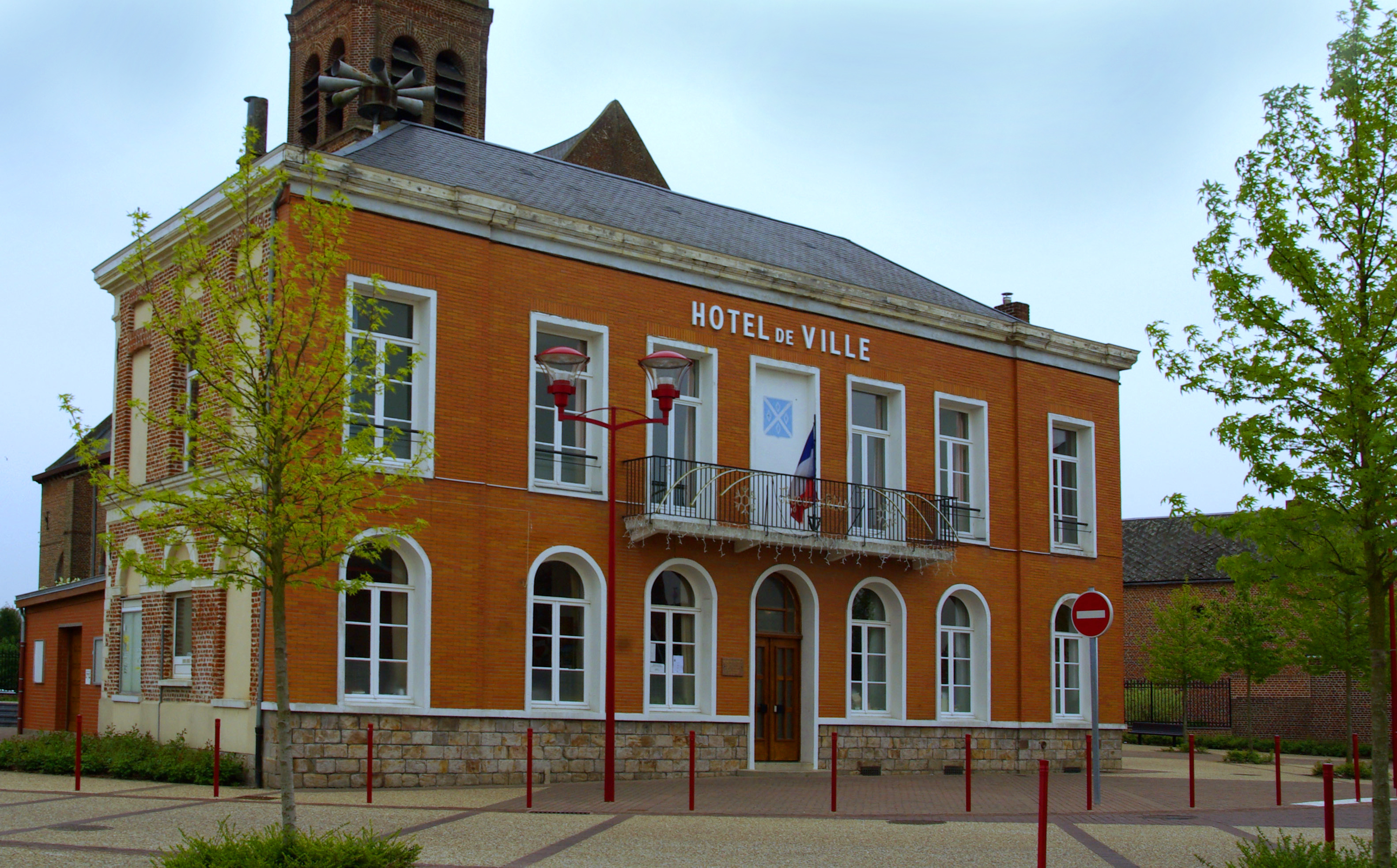
- The town hall in Quarouble

- Coat of arms
- Location of Quarouble
- Location within France Location within Hauts-de-France
- Coordinates: 50°23′23″N 3°37′26″E
- Country: France
- Region: Hauts-de-France
- Department: Nord
- Arrondissement: Valenciennes
- Canton: Marly
- Intercommunality: CA Valenciennes Métropole

Government
  - Mayor (2020–2026): Jean-Luc Delannoy
- Area^{1}: 12.27 km^{2} (4.74 sq mi)
- Elevation: 26 m (85 ft)
- Highest elevation: 51 m (167 ft)
- Lowest elevation: 16 m (52 ft)
- Population (2023): 3,145
  - Density: 256.3/km^{2} (663.9/sq mi)
- Time zone: UTC+01:00 (CET)
  - Summer (DST): UTC+02:00 (CEST)
- INSEE/Postal code: 59479 /59243
- ^{1} French Land Register data, which excludes lakes, ponds, glaciers > 1 km^{2} (0.386 sq mi or 247 acres) and river estuaries.

Quarouble (French pronunciation: [kaʁubl]) is a commune in the Nord department in northern France.

== Heraldry ==
Arms of Quarouble	The arms of Quarouble are blazoned : Azure, a saltire between 4 mascles argent.

== Population ==
Historical population
Year	Pop.	±% p.a.
1968	3,420	—
1975	3,404	−0.07%
1982	3,365	−0.16%
1990	3,277	−0.33%
1999	3,303	+0.09%
2007	3,180	−0.47%
2012	3,058	−0.78%
2017	2,992	−0.44%
2023	3,145	+0.83%
Source: INSEE

== 1954 incident ==
An alien encounter was reported in the commune in 1954 by Marius Dewilde. Calcinated rock was reportedly found at the site of the incident. Dewilde was one of hundreds of witnesses to describe anomalous phenomena in France during a UFO wave that took place over the course of two months in 1954.

== See also ==
- Communes of the Nord department
