= Saint-Aybert =

- Commune
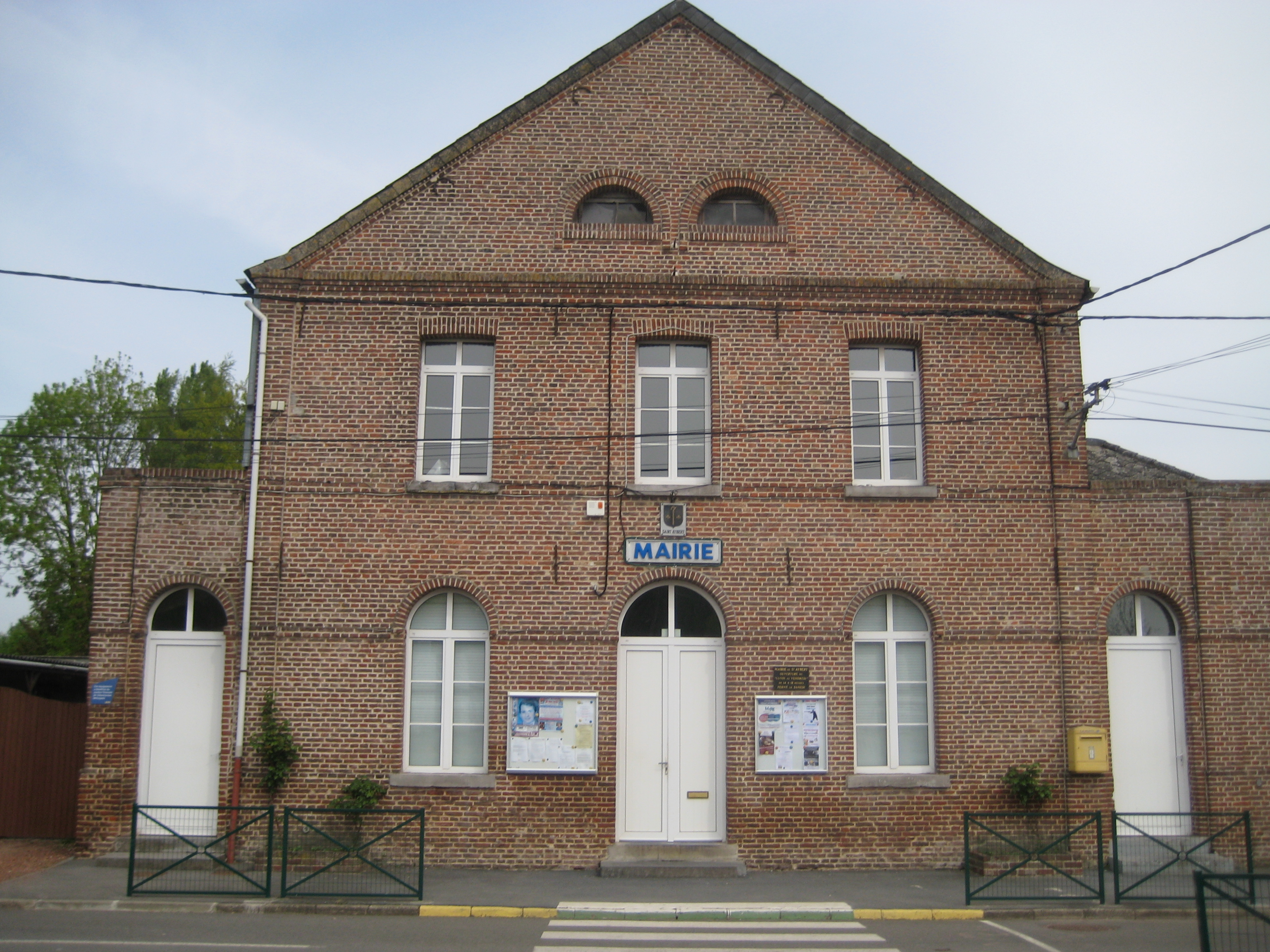
- The town hall in Saint-Aybert
- Location of Saint-Aybert
- Location within France Location within Hauts-de-France
- Coordinates: 50°26′56″N 3°39′18″E
- Country: France
- Region: Hauts-de-France
- Department: Nord
- Arrondissement: Valenciennes
- Canton: Marly
- Intercommunality: CA Valenciennes Métropole

Government
  - Mayor (2020–2026): Michaël Anière
- Area^{1}: 4.19 km^{2} (1.62 sq mi)
- Elevation: 19 m (62 ft)
- Highest elevation: 20 m (66 ft)
- Lowest elevation: 15 m (49 ft)
- Population (2023): 328
  - Density: 78.3/km^{2} (203/sq mi)
- Time zone: UTC+01:00 (CET)
  - Summer (DST): UTC+02:00 (CEST)
- INSEE/Postal code: 59530 /59163
- ^{1} French Land Register data, which excludes lakes, ponds, glaciers > 1 km^{2} (0.386 sq mi or 247 acres) and river estuaries.

Saint-Aybert (French pronunciation: [sɛ̃.t‿ebɛʁ]) is a commune in the Nord department in northern France.

== See also ==
- Communes of the Nord department
