= Curgies =

- Commune
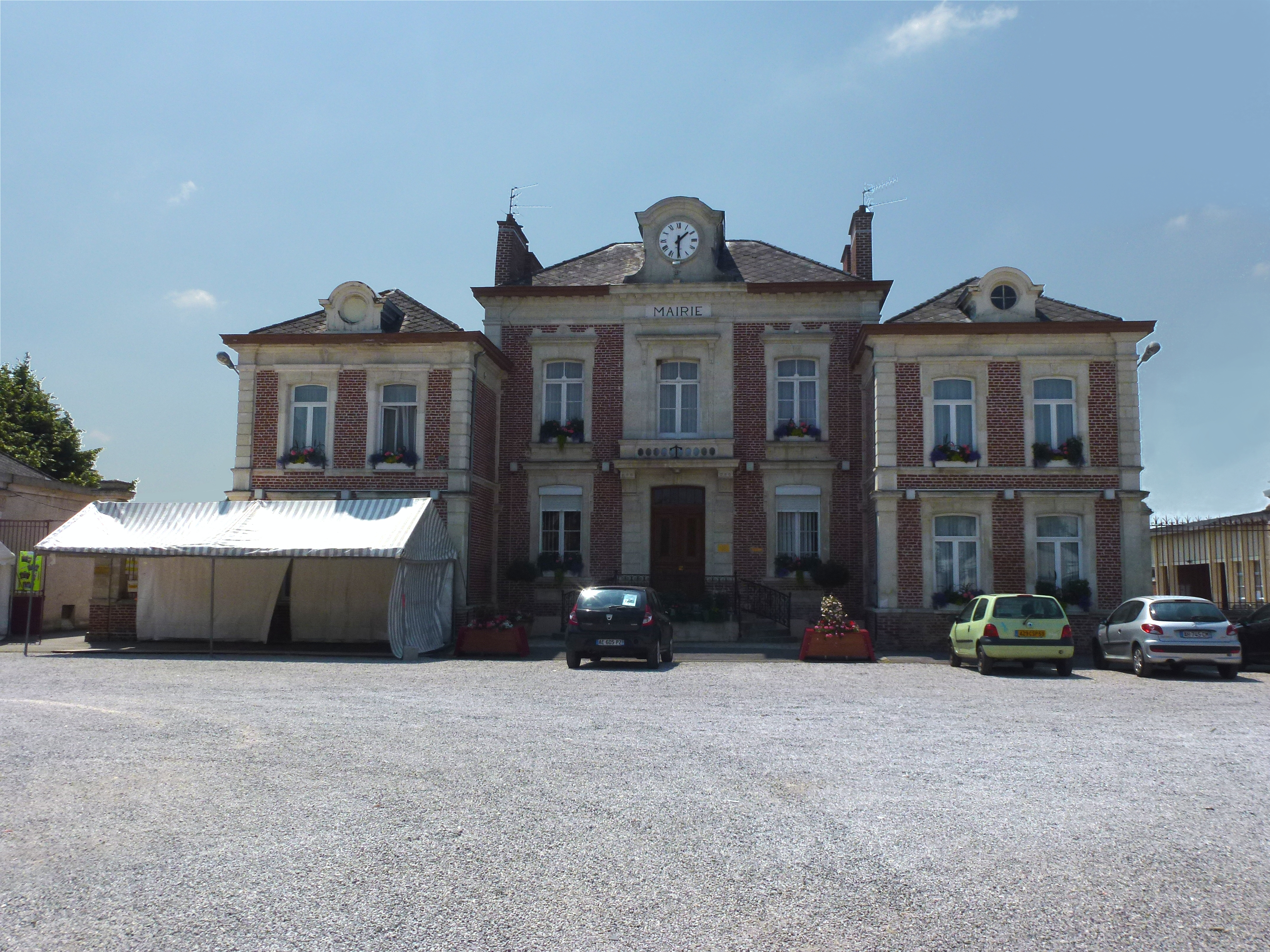
- The town hall in Curgies
- Location of Curgies
- Location within France Location within Hauts-de-France
- Coordinates: 50°19′44″N 3°36′11″E
- Country: France
- Region: Hauts-de-France
- Department: Nord
- Arrondissement: Valenciennes
- Canton: Marly
- Intercommunality: CA Valenciennes Métropole

Government
  - Mayor (2020–2026): Didier Vanesse
- Area^{1}: 6.08 km^{2} (2.35 sq mi)
- Elevation: 93 m (305 ft)
- Highest elevation: 118 m (387 ft)
- Lowest elevation: 78 m (256 ft)
- Population (2023): 1,333
  - Density: 219/km^{2} (568/sq mi)
- Time zone: UTC+01:00 (CET)
  - Summer (DST): UTC+02:00 (CEST)
- INSEE/Postal code: 59166 /59990
- ^{1} French Land Register data, which excludes lakes, ponds, glaciers > 1 km^{2} (0.386 sq mi or 247 acres) and river estuaries.

Curgies (French pronunciation: [kyʁʒi]) is a commune in the Nord department in northern France.

== Heraldry ==
Arms of Curgies	The arms of Curgies are blazoned : Argent, a sow passant sable on a base vert. (Curgies and Émerchicourt use the same arms.)

== See also ==
- Communes of the Nord department
