= Marly, Nord =

Marly
- Commune
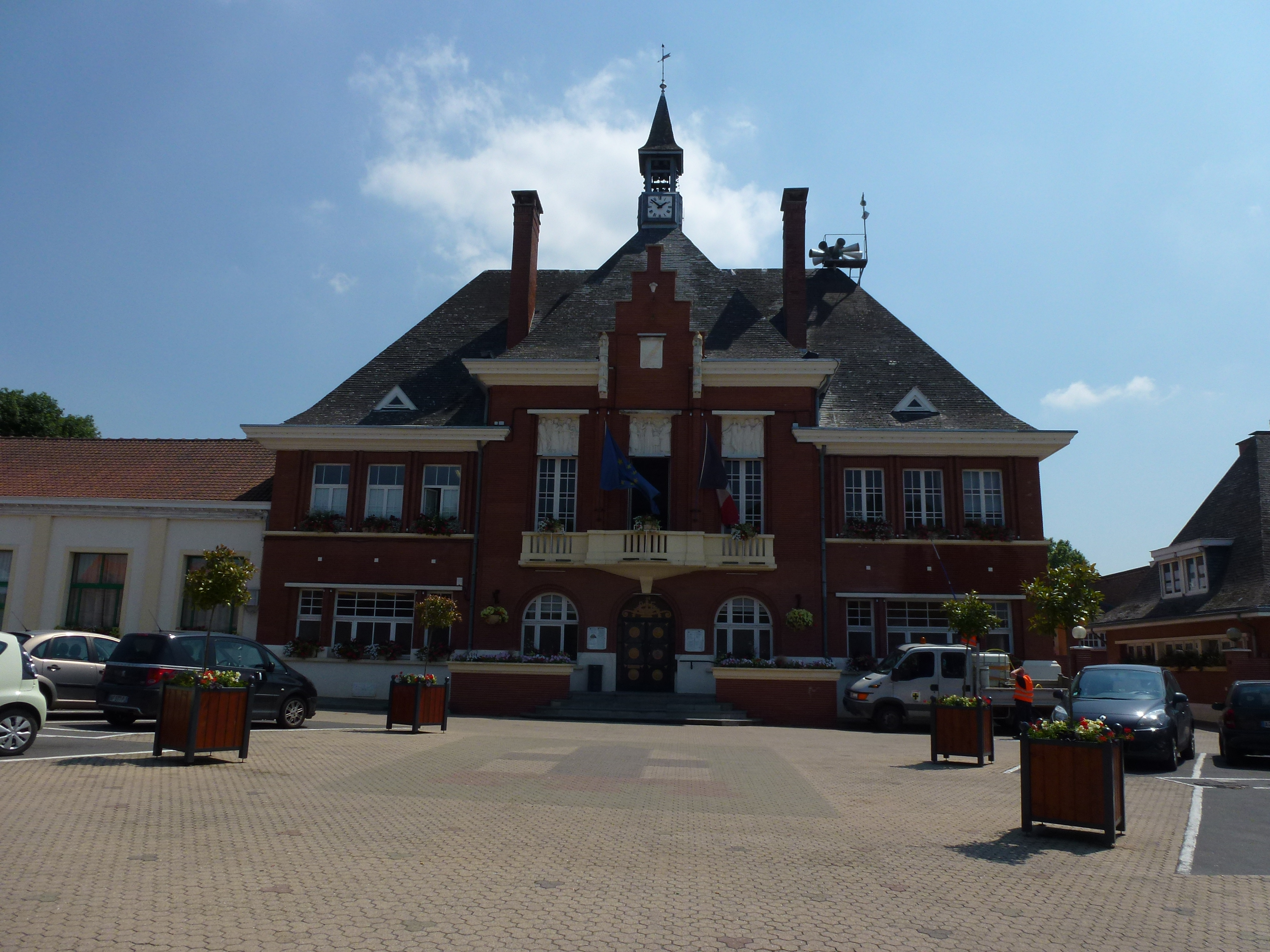
- The town hall in Marly

- Coat of arms
- Location of Marly
- Location within France Location within Hauts-de-France
- Coordinates: 50°20′56″N 3°32′42″E
- Country: France
- Region: Hauts-de-France
- Department: Nord
- Arrondissement: Valenciennes
- Canton: Marly
- Intercommunality: CA Valenciennes Métropole

Government
  - Mayor (2020–2026): Jean-Noël Verfaillie
- Area^{1}: 8.04 km^{2} (3.10 sq mi)
- Elevation: 35 m (115 ft)
- Highest elevation: 70 m (230 ft)
- Lowest elevation: 29 m (95 ft)
- Population (2023): 11,995
  - Density: 1,490/km^{2} (3,860/sq mi)
- Time zone: UTC+01:00 (CET)
  - Summer (DST): UTC+02:00 (CEST)
- INSEE/Postal code: 59383 /59770
- ^{1} French Land Register data, which excludes lakes, ponds, glaciers > 1 km^{2} (0.386 sq mi or 247 acres) and river estuaries.

Marly (French pronunciation: [maʁli]) is a commune in the Nord department in northern France.

It is 3 km (1.9 mi) southeast of Valenciennes.

== Population ==
Historical population
Year	Pop.	±% p.a.
1968	13,114	—
1975	15,390	+2.31%
1982	14,320	−1.02%
1990	12,081	−2.10%
1999	11,666	−0.39%
2007	11,883	+0.23%
2012	11,449	−0.74%
2017	11,855	+0.70%
2023	11,995	+0.20%
Source: INSEE

== Heraldry ==
Arms of Marly	The arms of Marly are blazoned : Or, a cross sable.

== See also ==
- Communes of the Nord department
