= Thiant =

- Commune
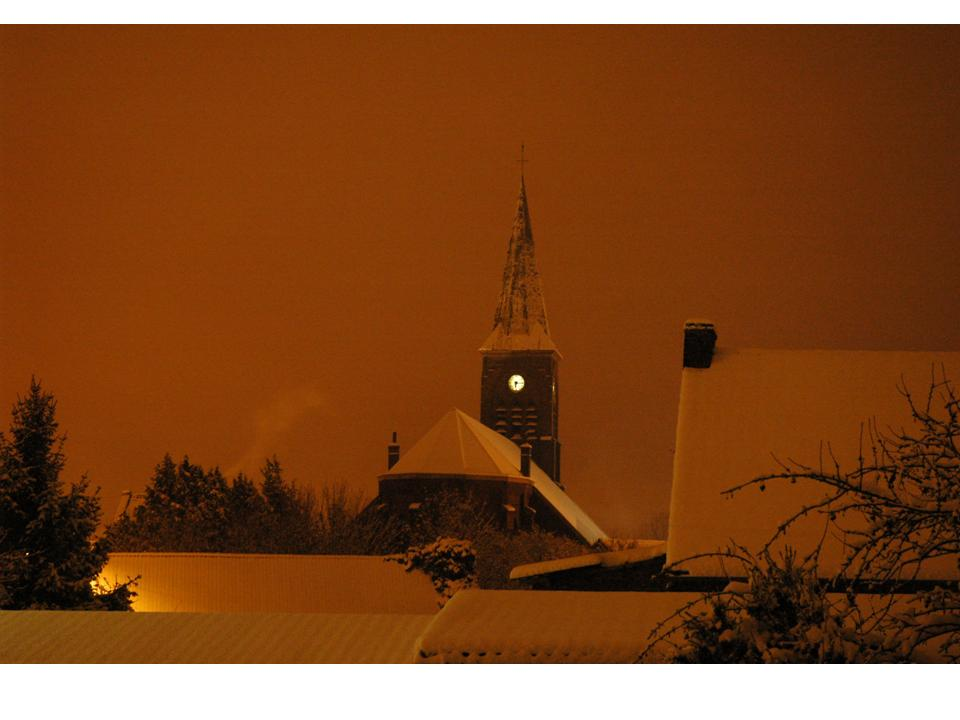
- The church in Thiant

- Coat of arms
- Location of Thiant
- Location within France Location within Hauts-de-France
- Coordinates: 50°18′23″N 3°26′57″E
- Country: France
- Region: Hauts-de-France
- Department: Nord
- Arrondissement: Valenciennes
- Canton: Aulnoy-lez-Valenciennes
- Intercommunality: CA Porte du Hainaut

Government
  - Mayor (2022–2026): Marc Wattiez
- Area^{1}: 8.39 km^{2} (3.24 sq mi)
- Elevation: 31 m (102 ft)
- Highest elevation: 72 m (236 ft)
- Lowest elevation: 26 m (85 ft)
- Population (2023): 2,914
  - Density: 347/km^{2} (900/sq mi)
- Time zone: UTC+01:00 (CET)
  - Summer (DST): UTC+02:00 (CEST)
- INSEE/Postal code: 59589 /59224
- ^{1} French Land Register data, which excludes lakes, ponds, glaciers > 1 km^{2} (0.386 sq mi or 247 acres) and river estuaries.

Thiant (French pronunciation: [tjɑ̃]) is a commune in the Nord department in northern France.

== Population ==
Historical population
Year	Pop.	±% p.a.
1968	2,925	—
1975	2,699	−1.14%
1982	2,635	−0.34%
1990	2,593	−0.20%
1999	2,568	−0.11%
2007	2,534	−0.17%
2012	2,619	+0.66%
2017	2,917	+2.18%
2023	2,914	−0.02%
Source: INSEE

== Heraldry ==
Arms of Thiant	The arms of Thiant are blazoned : Vert, billetty, a lion argent, armed and langued gules. (Thiant and Aubry-du-Hainaut use the same arms.)

== See also ==
- Communes of the Nord department
