= Rombies-et-Marchipont =

- Commune
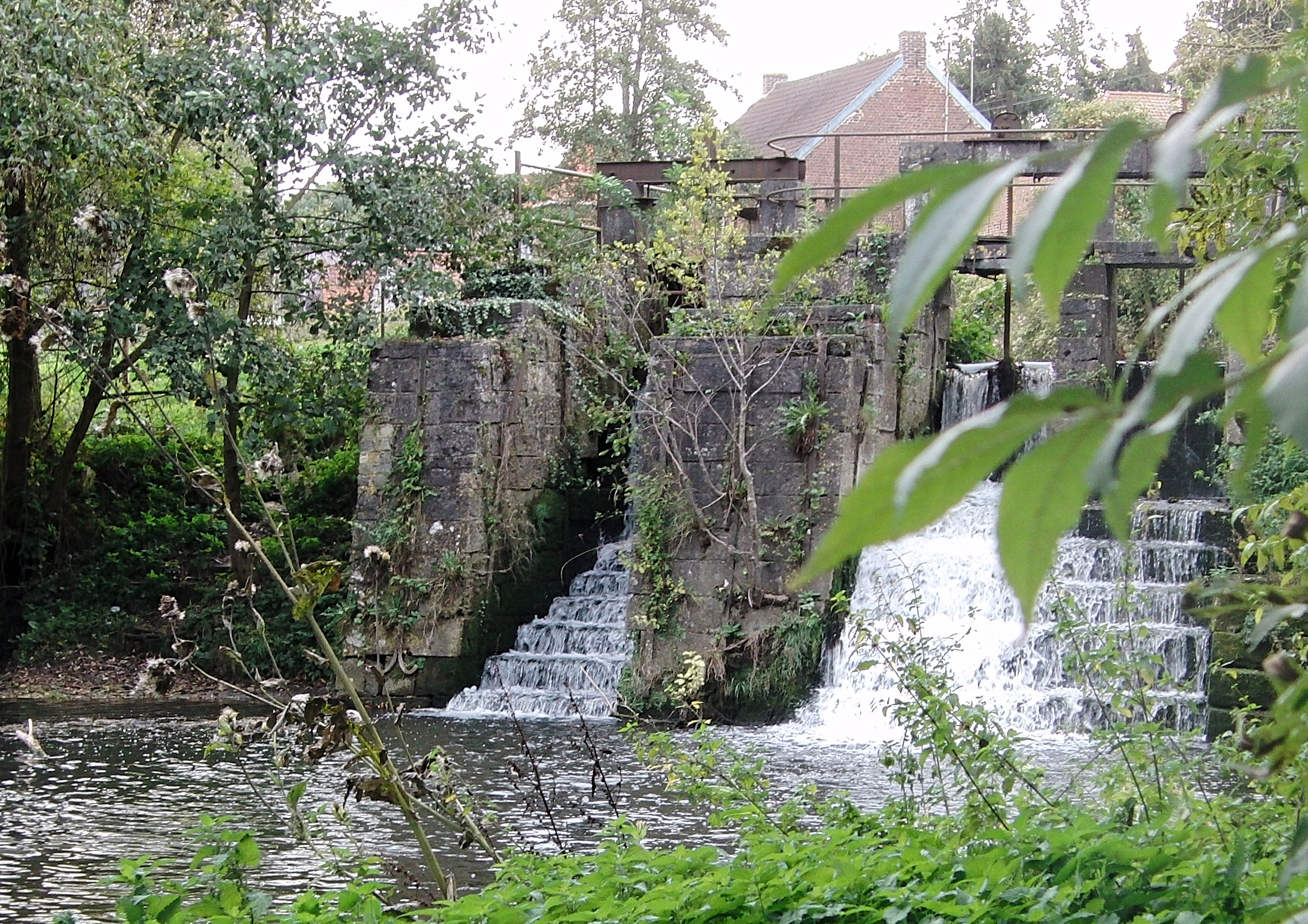
- The Aunelle Valley mill in Rombies-et-Marchipont

- Coat of arms
- Location of Rombies-et-Marchipont
- Location within France Location within Hauts-de-France
- Coordinates: 50°21′58″N 3°38′46″E
- Country: France
- Region: Hauts-de-France
- Department: Nord
- Arrondissement: Valenciennes
- Canton: Marly
- Intercommunality: CA Valenciennes Métropole

Government
  - Mayor (2020–2026): Agnès Dolet
- Area^{1}: 4.81 km^{2} (1.86 sq mi)
- Elevation: 50 m (160 ft)
- Highest elevation: 81 m (266 ft)
- Lowest elevation: 34 m (112 ft)
- Population (2023): 741
  - Density: 154/km^{2} (399/sq mi)
- Time zone: UTC+01:00 (CET)
  - Summer (DST): UTC+02:00 (CEST)
- INSEE/Postal code: 59505 /59990
- ^{1} French Land Register data, which excludes lakes, ponds, glaciers > 1 km^{2} (0.386 sq mi or 247 acres) and river estuaries.

Rombies-et-Marchipont (French pronunciation: [ʁɔ̃bi e maʁʃipɔ̃]) is a commune in the Nord department in northern France.

== Heraldry ==
Arms of Rombies-et-Marchipont	The arms of Rombies-et-Marchipont are blazoned : Azure, a cross moline between 4 mullets of 6 points argent. (Rombies-et-Marchipont and Sepmeries use the same arms.)

== See also ==
- Communes of the Nord department
