= Monceau-Saint-Waast =

- Commune
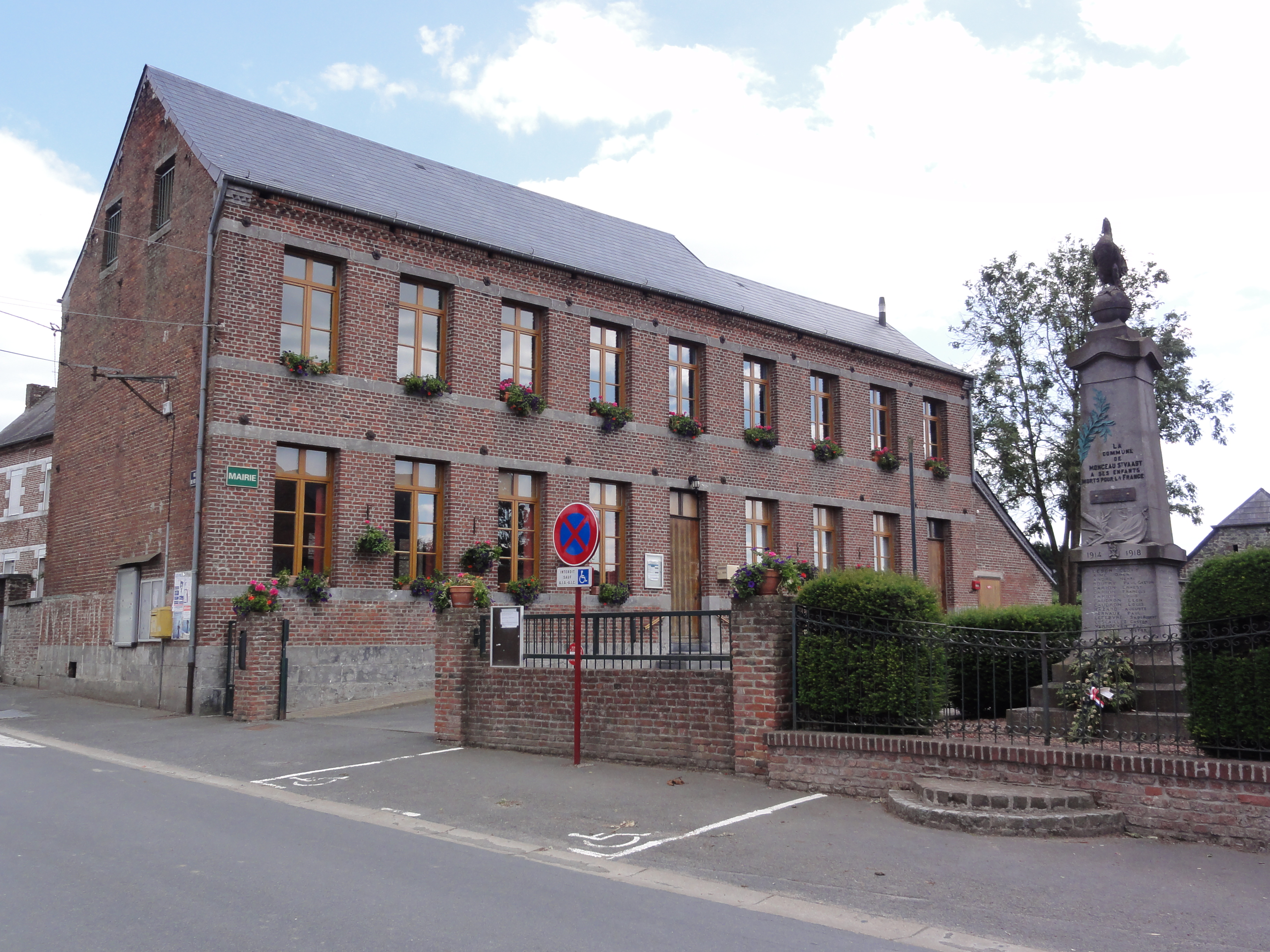
- The town hall in Monceau-Saint-Waast

- Coat of arms
- Location of Monceau-Saint-Waast
- Location within France Location within Hauts-de-France
- Coordinates: 50°10′16″N 3°51′20″E
- Country: France
- Region: Hauts-de-France
- Department: Nord
- Arrondissement: Avesnes-sur-Helpe
- Canton: Aulnoye-Aymeries
- Intercommunality: CA Maubeuge Val de Sambre

Government
  - Mayor (2020–2026): Serge Guillaume
- Area^{1}: 5.93 km^{2} (2.29 sq mi)
- Elevation: 153 m (502 ft)
- Highest elevation: 171 m (561 ft)
- Lowest elevation: 132 m (433 ft)
- Population (2023): 419
  - Density: 70.7/km^{2} (183/sq mi)
- Time zone: UTC+01:00 (CET)
  - Summer (DST): UTC+02:00 (CEST)
- INSEE/Postal code: 59406 /59620
- ^{1} French Land Register data, which excludes lakes, ponds, glaciers > 1 km^{2} (0.386 sq mi or 247 acres) and river estuaries.

Monceau-Saint-Waast (French pronunciation: [mɔ̃so sɛ̃ va]) is a commune in the Nord department in northern France.

== Heraldry ==
Arms of Monceau-Saint-Waast	The arms of Monceau-Saint-Waast are blazoned : Gules, a unicorn sejant argent. (Monceau-Saint-Waast and Odomez use the same arms.)

== See also ==
- Communes of the Nord department
