= Aubry-du-Hainaut =

- Commune
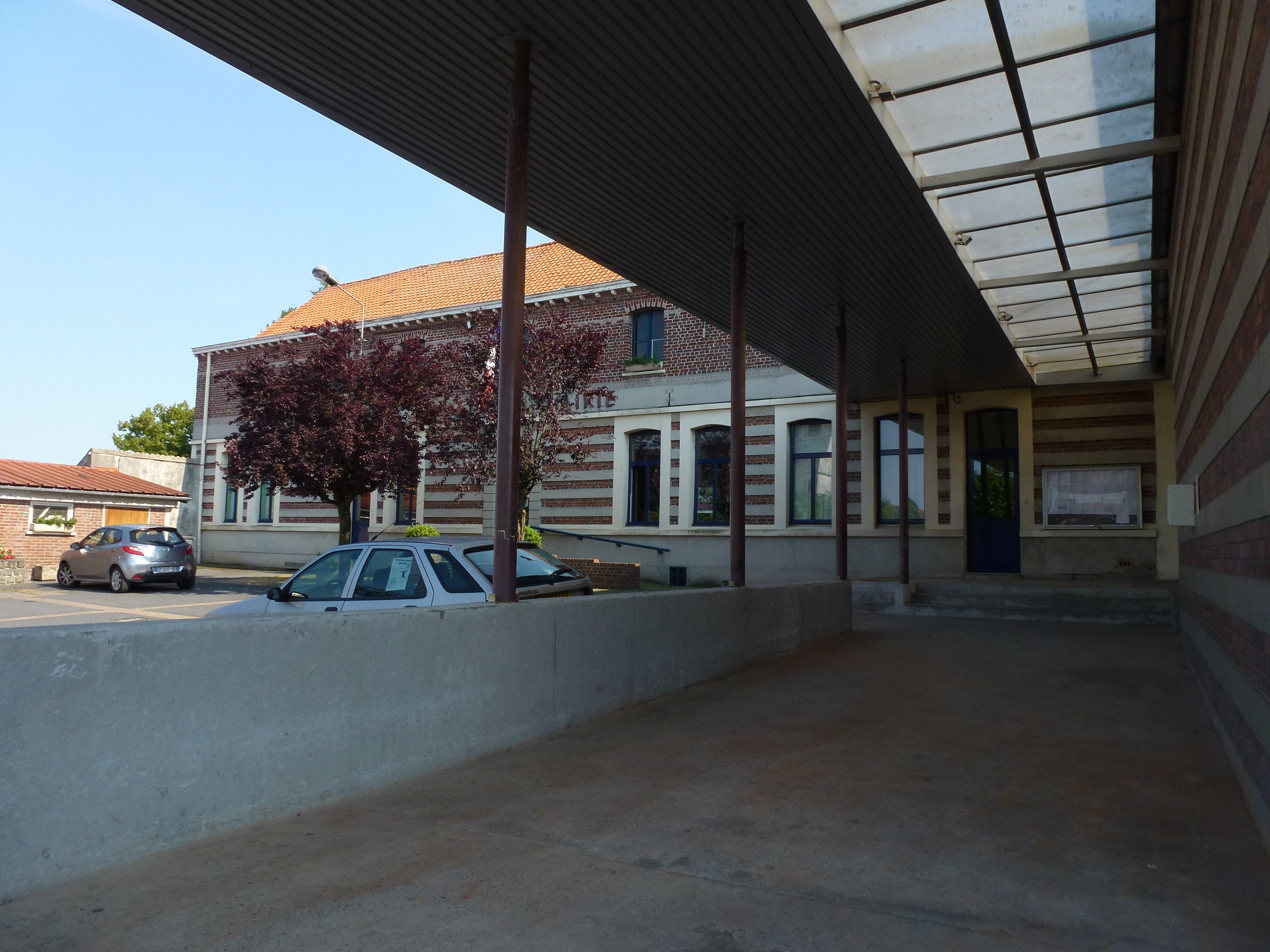
- The town hall in Aubry-du-Hainaut

- Coat of arms
- Location of Aubry-du-Hainaut
- Location within France Location within Hauts-de-France
- Coordinates: 50°22′15″N 3°27′42″E
- Country: France
- Region: Hauts-de-France
- Department: Nord
- Arrondissement: Valenciennes
- Canton: Aulnoy-lez-Valenciennes
- Intercommunality: CA Valenciennes Métropole

Government
  - Mayor (2020–2026): Raymond Zingraff
- Area^{1}: 4.32 km^{2} (1.67 sq mi)
- Elevation: 30 m (98 ft)
- Highest elevation: 48 m (157 ft)
- Lowest elevation: 25 m (82 ft)
- Population (2023): 1,705
  - Density: 395/km^{2} (1,020/sq mi)
- Time zone: UTC+01:00 (CET)
  - Summer (DST): UTC+02:00 (CEST)
- INSEE/Postal code: 59027 /59494
- ^{1} French Land Register data, which excludes lakes, ponds, glaciers > 1 km^{2} (0.386 sq mi or 247 acres) and river estuaries.

Aubry-du-Hainaut (French pronunciation: [obʁi dy ɛno]) is a commune in the Nord department in northern France.

== Population ==
Historical population
Year	Pop.	±% p.a.
1968	1,206	—
1975	1,245	+0.46%
1982	1,477	+2.47%
1990	1,444	−0.28%
1999	1,435	−0.07%
2007	1,443	+0.07%
2012	1,457	+0.19%
2017	1,679	+2.88%
2023	1,705	+0.26%
Source: INSEE

== Heraldry ==
Arms of Aubry-du-Hainaut	The arms of Aubry-du-Hainaut are blazoned : Vert, billetty, a lion argent, armed and langued gules. (Thiant and Aubry-du-Hainaut use the same arms.)

== See also ==
- Communes of the Nord department
