= Préseau =

- Commune
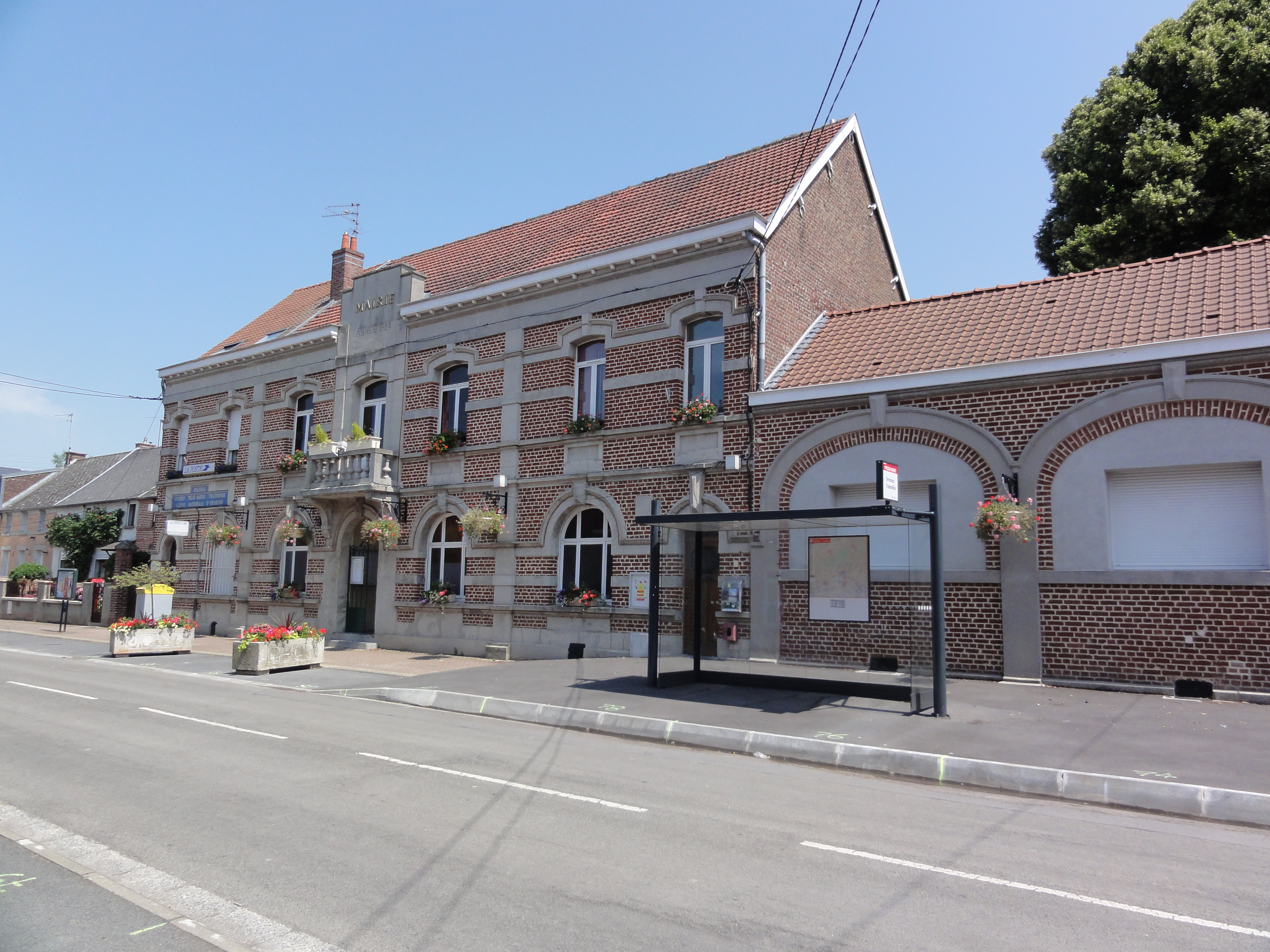
- The town hall in Préseau

- Coat of arms
- Location of Préseau
- Location within France Location within Hauts-de-France
- Coordinates: 50°18′40″N 3°34′30″E
- Country: France
- Region: Hauts-de-France
- Department: Nord
- Arrondissement: Valenciennes
- Canton: Marly
- Intercommunality: CA Valenciennes Métropole

Government
  - Mayor (2020–2026): Sandrine François-Lagny
- Area^{1}: 6.34 km^{2} (2.45 sq mi)
- Elevation: 85 m (279 ft)
- Highest elevation: 99 m (325 ft)
- Lowest elevation: 49 m (161 ft)
- Population (2023): 2,100
  - Density: 330/km^{2} (860/sq mi)
- Time zone: UTC+01:00 (CET)
  - Summer (DST): UTC+02:00 (CEST)
- INSEE/Postal code: 59471 /59990
- ^{1} French Land Register data, which excludes lakes, ponds, glaciers > 1 km^{2} (0.386 sq mi or 247 acres) and river estuaries.

Préseau (French pronunciation: [pʁezo], in picard: Pérziau) is a commune in the Nord department of northern France.

== Heraldry ==
Blason de Préseau	Héraldique du blason de Préseau : Vairé d'or et de sable, au croissant de gueules brochant sur le tout

== History ==
Préseau is first mentioned in 1173 when the place is called "Presel", meadow in Old French. Only in 1724 was the name Préseau definitely chosen.

In the first half of the fifteenth century, the tiny village has a total of 22 "feux", meaning 22 houses. The inhabitants essentially live off the land since their principal activity is agriculture. Documents containing the fiefs held by the count of Hainaut testify the building of a kiln belonging to the count which stays up for all the fifteenth century.

Préseau was one of the six peerages of the county of Valenciennes. A peerage is inherited from father to son by virtue of blood link.

On 9 October 1918 Canadian pilot Captain Lynn Campbell and his machine-gunner 2nd Lieutenant William Hodgkinson of the Royal Air Force (Royal Flying Corps) were shot down in their Bristol Fighter above Préseau by Paul Bäumer of Jasta 2. They are buried in the cemetery, left to the calvary behind the church.

== Population ==
Historical population
Year	Pop.	±% p.a.
1968	1,590	—
1975	1,675	+0.75%
1982	1,812	+1.13%
1990	1,900	+0.59%
1999	1,833	−0.40%
2007	1,870	+0.25%
2012	1,821	−0.53%
2017	1,932	+1.19%
2023	2,100	+1.40%
Source: INSEE

== Administration ==
List of recent mayors :

- Jean-Marc Richard : 2001-2014 Ind.
- Sandrine François Lagny : 2014-2032 Ind.

== Landmarks ==
- The village used to have a castle, now in ruins, but few lords ever dwelled there.
- The Church of Sainte Aldegonde, built in 1866. Inside can be found a wide variety of statues.
- A calvary built in 1833, the chapel of Notre-Dame-de-Bon-Voyage and other secondary chapels.
- The war memorial in remembrance of the seventy-two soldiers killed during the First World War.
- The British cemetery with the 107 graves of the British soldiers who died during the battle for the village in 1918.
- The old brewery.

== Local customs ==
- Local dish : the "tarte à prones" (plum pie).
- Folk song : Vive Persiais (Préseau in the local dialect)

== See also ==
- Communes of the Nord department
