= Vicq, Nord =

Vicq
- Commune
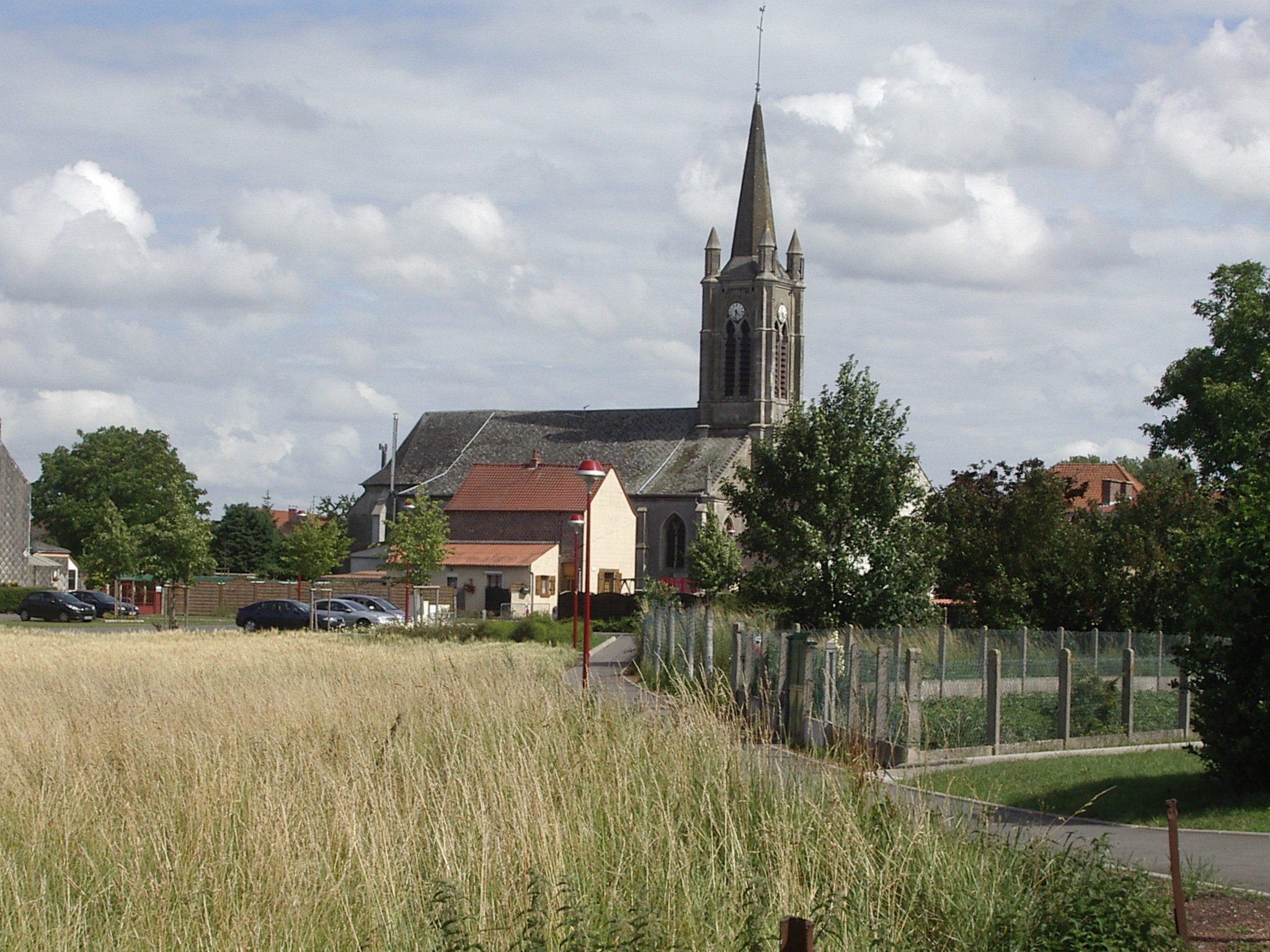
- The church in Vicq

- Coat of arms
- Location of Vicq
- Location within France Location within Hauts-de-France
- Coordinates: 50°24′33″N 3°36′21″E
- Country: France
- Region: Hauts-de-France
- Department: Nord
- Arrondissement: Valenciennes
- Canton: Marly
- Intercommunality: CA Valenciennes Métropole

Government
  - Mayor (2020–2026): Jean-Charles Dulion
- Area^{1}: 3.92 km^{2} (1.51 sq mi)
- Elevation: 21 m (69 ft)
- Highest elevation: 23 m (75 ft)
- Lowest elevation: 15 m (49 ft)
- Population (2023): 1,464
  - Density: 373/km^{2} (967/sq mi)
- Time zone: UTC+01:00 (CET)
  - Summer (DST): UTC+02:00 (CEST)
- INSEE/Postal code: 59613 /59970
- ^{1} French Land Register data, which excludes lakes, ponds, glaciers > 1 km^{2} (0.386 sq mi or 247 acres) and river estuaries.

Vicq (French pronunciation: [vik]) is a commune in the Nord department in northern France.

== Heraldry ==
Arms of Vicq	The arms of Vicq are blazoned : Azure semy de lys, a cross patty argent.

== See also ==
- Communes of the Nord department
