= Canton of Anzin =

Administrativne division of the Nord department, northern France

Coordinates: 50.37°N 3.50°E

The canton of Anzin is an administrative division of the Nord department, northern France. Its borders were modified at the French canton reorganisation which came into effect in March 2015. Its seat is in Anzin.

It consists of the following communes:

1. Anzin
2. Beuvrages
3. Bruay-sur-l'Escaut
4. Escautpont
5. Fresnes-sur-Escaut
6. Onnaing
