= Condé-sur-l'Escaut =

- Commune
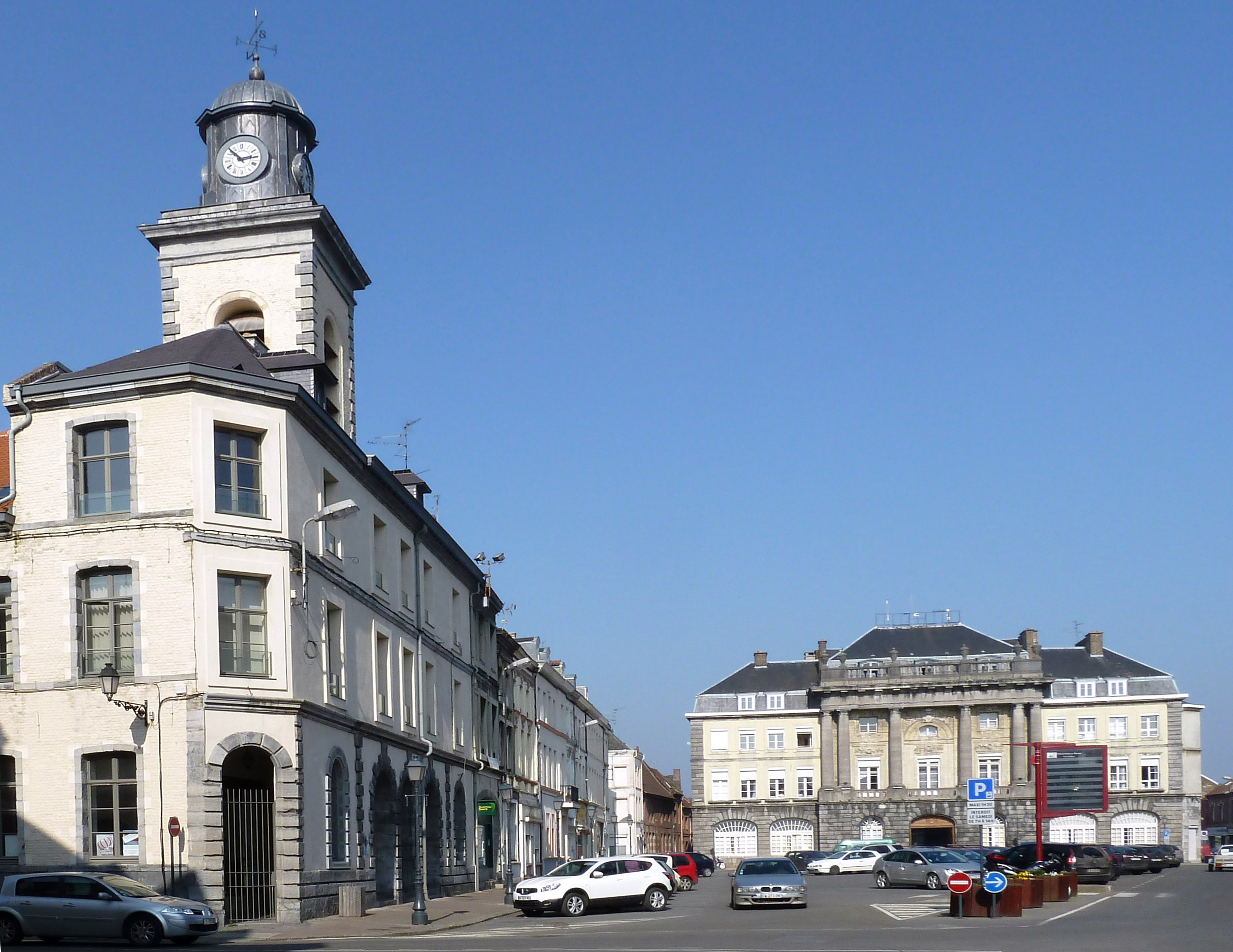
- The town hall in Condé-sur-l'Escaut

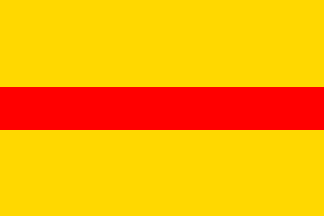
- Flag Coat of arms
- Location of Condé-sur-l'Escaut
- Location within France Location within Hauts-de-France
- Coordinates: 50°27′00″N 3°35′29″E
- Country: France
- Region: Hauts-de-France
- Department: Nord
- Arrondissement: Valenciennes
- Canton: Marly
- Intercommunality: CA Valenciennes Métropole

Government
  - Mayor (2020–2026): Grégory Lelong
- Area^{1}: 18.4 km^{2} (7.1 sq mi)
- Elevation: 21 m (69 ft)
- Highest elevation: 52 m (171 ft)
- Lowest elevation: 10 m (33 ft)
- Population (2023): 9,253
  - Density: 503/km^{2} (1,300/sq mi)
- Time zone: UTC+01:00 (CET)
  - Summer (DST): UTC+02:00 (CEST)
- INSEE/Postal code: 59153 /59163
- ^{1} French Land Register data, which excludes lakes, ponds, glaciers > 1 km^{2} (0.386 sq mi or 247 acres) and river estuaries.

Condé-sur-l'Escaut (French pronunciation: [kɔ̃de syʁ lɛsko], literally Condé on the Escaut; Picard: Condé-su-l'Escaut) is a commune of the Nord department in northern France.

It lies on the border with Belgium. The population as of 2023 was 9,253. Residents of the area are known as Condéens or Condéennes. The Mayor of Condé-sur-l'Escaut is Gregory Lelong, re-elected in 2020.

== Geography ==
Condé-sur-l'Escaut is 12 km (7.5 mi) northeast of Valenciennes, 51 km (32 mi) from Lille, and 90 km (56 mi) from Brussels, Belgium. It is situated at the confluence of the Haine and Scheldt rivers. The region is noted for its coal mines, resources which made it a strategic objective in both world wars.

== History ==
The name comes from a Celtic word, "Condate", meaning "confluence", referring to the two rivers. A Romanised form of the word, Condatum, was in use during the Roman period, and "Condé" was in use by the 14th century. The current name, Condé-sur-l'Escaut, dates from 1886.

Being at the confluence of two rivers, the site has had military importance since before Roman times. Originally occupied by Nervians, it was the location of a Roman military camp, and later a settlement of Franks. Saint Wasnulf preached at Condé, and died there around 650 AD. His remains were long held in a collegiate church there. Vikings also were established there temporarily, in 855, holding the town until 889.

The area was much disputed, and changed hands many times during the Middle Ages and Renaissance periods. It was captured by the Flemish forces of Jacques van Artevelde, by King Louis XI of France, by Les Gueux during the Eighty Years' War, and by Turenne. In 1676 Louis XIV seized the town, and it became part of France in 1678 with the Treaty of Nimègue. While Vauban improved its fortifications, it was captured by Prince Josias of Saxe-Coburg-Saalfeld after a 92-day siege in 1793. Forces of the Seventh Coalition captured it from Napoleon Bonaparte in 1815, only returning it to French control three years later.

The town was occupied by the Germans during the Second World War, who used the population to run the adjacent coal mines. On 2 September 1944 the town was liberated by the U.S. 5th Armored Division. Coal mining became defunct in 1989; recently there has been a population decline, following a high (13,994) in 1975.

=== Music history ===
Condé-sur-l'Escaut is known in music history as the home, place of retirement, and burial place of Renaissance composer Josquin des Prez. He was provost of the church of Notre-Dame, which had one of the most sumptuous musical establishments in Hainaut, exceeded only by the cathedral at Cambrai, as well as St. Vincent at Soignies. Josquin's house was on the market square; on his death he left an endowment for processions to stop at the statue of the Virgin Mary, attached to a wall of his house, and sing his six-voice Pater noster. He was buried in the church, which was destroyed in 1793 along with his tombstone.

== Population ==
Historical population
Year	Pop.	±% p.a.
1968	13,607	—
1975	13,994	+0.40%
1982	13,671	−0.33%
1990	11,289	−2.36%
1999	10,527	−0.77%
2007	9,992	−0.65%
2012	9,783	−0.42%
2017	9,698	−0.17%
2023	9,253	−0.78%
Source: INSEE

== Heraldry ==
Arms of Condé-sur-l'Escaut	The arms of Condé-sur-l'Escaut are blazoned : Or, a fess gules. (Condé-sur-l'Escaut and Haverskerque use the same arms.)

== Administration ==
Condé-sur-l'Escaut is the eastern member of the agglomerated Valenciennes metropolitan area, which together administers 35 communes.
