= Coron =

Coron can refer to:

== Places ==
- Coron, Palawan, a municipality in the Philippines
  - Coron Island, under the jurisdiction of the municipality, Philippines
- Coron, Maine-et-Loire, a commune in the Maine-et-Loire département in France
- Coron, the Venetian name of the coastal town of Koroni on the Ionian Sea, in present-day Greece.
  - Siege of Coron

== People ==
- Jean-Michel Coron (born 1956), a French mathematician
- Coron D. Evans (born 1844), an American soldier

== Other ==
- (urbanism) Coron, a historical type of working-class housing found in parts of Northern France and Belgium
- Coron Land, a 1995 action video game
- Llywelyn's coronet (Coron Arthur)
- "Les corons", French miner's song
