= Compagnie des Canonniers de Lille =

Coal mining company in Lille, France

- Industry: Coal mining
- Founded: 1833; 192 years ago in Lille, France
- Defunct: 1850
- Headquarters: Lille, France

The Compagnie des Canonniers de Lille was a coal mining company founded in 1833, during the coal-finding fever. It carried out several test pits and then opened a pit at Marchiennes in the Nord-Pas-de-Calais coalfield. Its name refers to the battalion of sedentary gunners from Lille, famous at the time for their part in defending the city during the siege of 1792.

The first drillings were carried out in Wattignies and Loos, but without success, as they were outside the mining basin. The Company undertook another borehole at Flers but abandoned it after a landslide. However, had it been extended a few more meters, the Company would have discovered the Pas-de-Calais mining basin well before the Compagnie des mines de l'Escarpelle, which had discovered it in 1846. The Company then moved to Marchiennes, where in 1752 the Compagnie Wuillaume-Turner had tried unsuccessfully to establish a pit. Several holes were drilled in Marchiennes, followed by a pit in 1838, from which over 4,000 tons of poor-quality coal were extracted. Boreholes were drilled in Villers-Pol and Jenlain, also without success, as they were located outside the mining basin. In 1850, the Company was liquidated for failure to obtain a concession, and the shaft was crimped.

== History ==
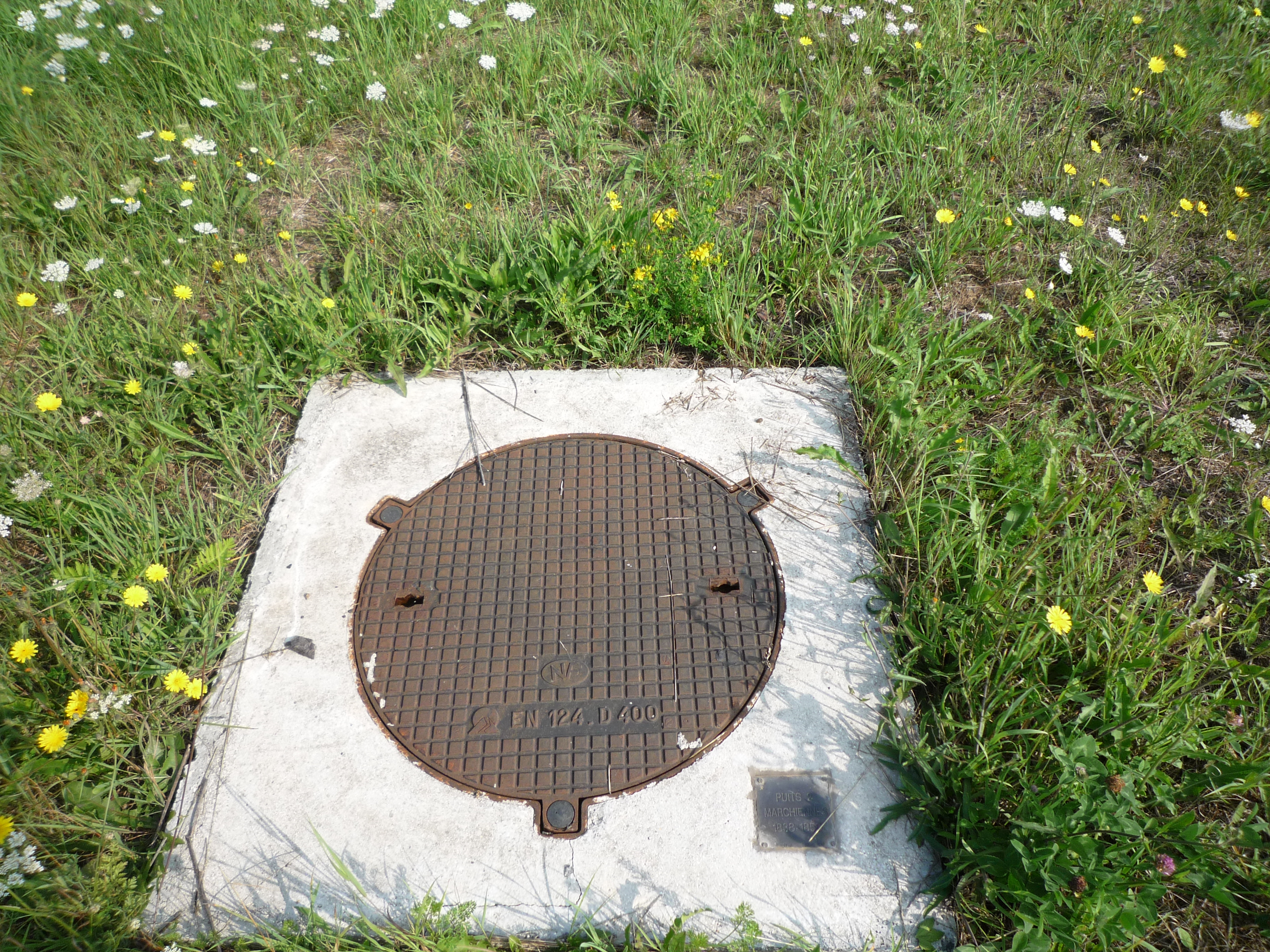
The wellhead marked “Well 2 Marchiennes” is the only trace on the surface proving that there was coal mining in Marchiennes.

The 1830s and 1840s were a period of great enthusiasm for industrial ventures of all kinds, particularly coal mining. In the Nord region, this craze followed the discovery of a rich deposit of greasy coal by the newly-formed Compagnie des Mines de Douchy. The soil, or one twenty-sixth of this company, which sold for barely 2,230 francs in February 1833, reached the exorbitant price of 300,000 francs in January 1834. Requests for concessions multiplied in the region (up to 70 in 1837). This coal-finding fever led to the creation of a large number of companies, few of which managed to last.

The Compagnie des Canonniers de Lille was formed in Lille in 1833. Two boreholes were drilled in Wattignies and Loos, outside the coalfield, where the coalfield was not reached, but the blue limestone was. The Wattignies borehole had been drilled in 1784 and had already been re-drilled in 1822.

While the Company was engaged in finding coal, other companies were working nearby. To the northeast, the Société de Saint-Hubert carried out several unsuccessful test pits. To the east, in Raismes, in 1839, the Compagnie de Cambrai opened the Boitelle pit, the Compagnie de l'Escaut opened the Le Bret and Évrard pits, and the Compagnie de Bruille opened the Ewbank pit. The latter three merged to form the Compagnie de Vicoigne. In the south, the Compagnie des mines d'Anzin opens pits at Denain and Escaudain. The Compagnie des mines d'Aniche opened the Aoust, La Renaissance, Saint Louis, Fénelon, and Traisnel pits outside the concession in 1836, 1839, 1843, 1847, and 1848 respectively, in Aniche and Somain, in what was then an undeveloped part of the concession.

== Well drilling ==
=== Flers borehole ===
In 1835, the Company established a borehole at Flers, near the Fort de Scarpe. It reached a depth of 206.45 meters and was certainly going to reach the coalfield a few meters further on, as the work of the Compagnie de l'Escarpelle later showed when a landslide forced it to abandon the borehole. An accident, a fortuitous cause, thus delayed the discovery of the new Pas-de-Calais basin by ten years and took away the priority of this discovery from the Compagnie des Canonniers. This Company then abandoned the well-chosen site and moved its research to the Marchiennes area, where it carried out numerous unsuccessful drill holes and a pit, with perseverance that would have deserved a better result.

=== No. 2 of Parterre de l'Abbaye borehole ===
50°24′47″N 3°16′45″E

In 1835, the Compagnie des Canonniers began drilling a hole a short distance north of the Marchiennes bell tower, in a place called Parterre de l'Abbaye. It reached the coalfield at a depth of 135 meters, and explored it over a height of 28 meters, in which it only crossed a coal-bearing layer. The depth is 163 meters.

=== Trois Pucelles borehole ===
50°26′13″N 3°15′50″E

The Trois Pucelles borehole, drilled by the Compagnie des Canonniers de Lille in 1835, in Marchiennes, to the east of the Bouvignies bell tower, entered calcareous schists related to carboniferous limestone at 137.80 meters. The depth reached was 141.32 meters.

=== La Motte borehole ===
50°24′26″N 3°17′45″E

The La Motte borehole was drilled in Marchiennes in 1836, to the southeast of the Parterre de l'Abbaye borehole. It uncovered coal-bearing ground at a depth of 129 meters without actually encountering any coal. It traversed 36 meters of siliceous shale, some of it very hard. The hole reached a depth of 163.69 meters and was abandoned in 1837.

=== Abbaye borehole ===
50°24′31″N 3°17′25″E

The Abbaye borehole was drilled by the Compagnie des Canonniers de Lille in Marchiennes in 1837 to the southeast of the Parterre de l'Abbaye borehole. It uncovered the coalfield at a depth of 132 meters but without encountering any coal. It crossed 19 meters of siliceous shale, some of it very hard. It was abandoned at 151.30 meters in very hard shale without discovering any coal.

=== Canonniers borehole ===
50°17′12″N 3°37′51″E

In 1837, the Société des Canonniers took over the Villers-Pol pit, dug in 1778 by the Société Martho. According to more recent documents, this was a “Canonniers” borehole, not a mine shaft. Boreholes have also been dug at Jenlain, a little further north of Villers-Pol.

=== Marchiennes pit ===
50°24′38″N 3°17′16″E

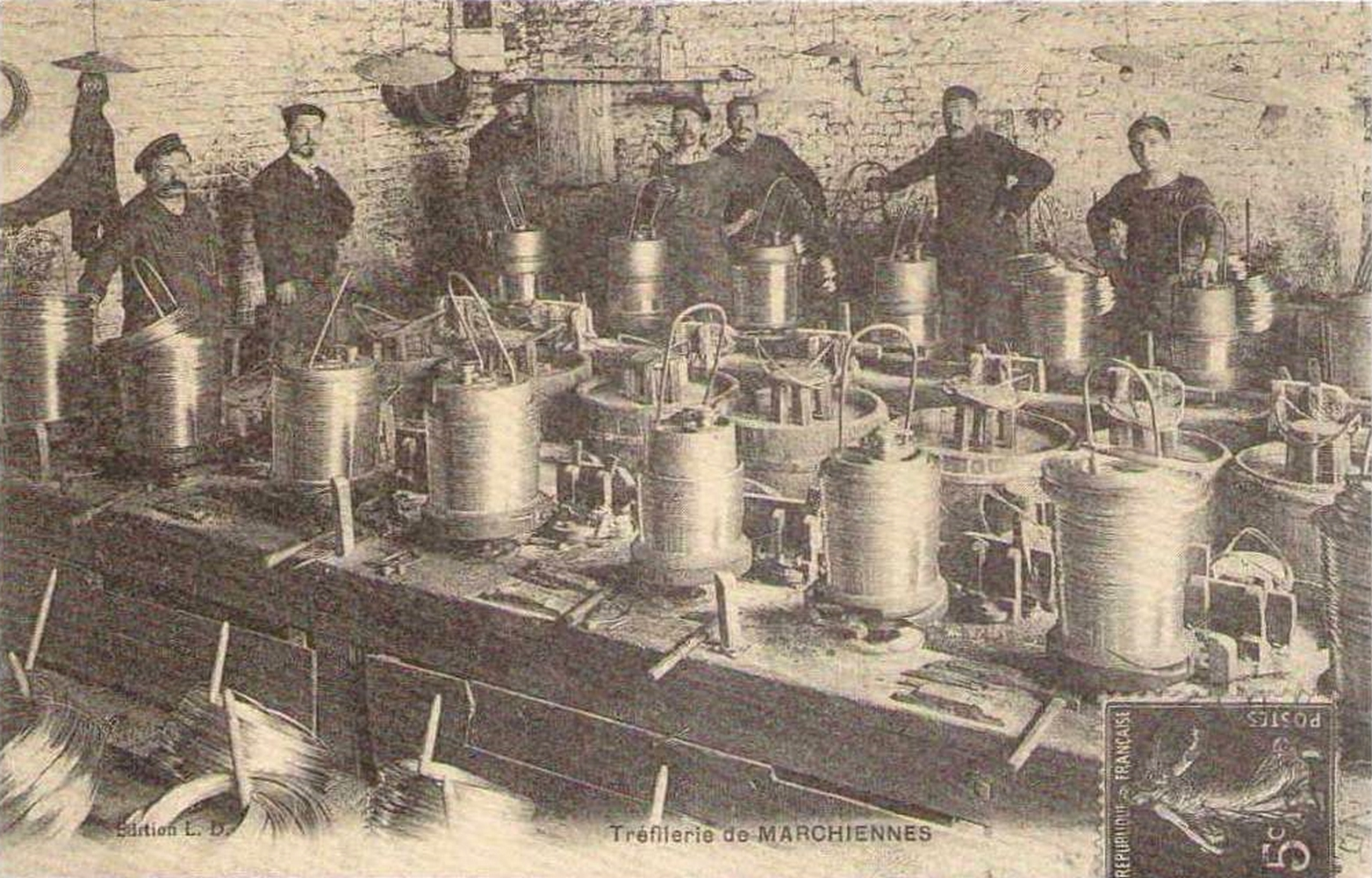
The Tréfilerie factory used the well over its first 35 meters to ensure its industrial water supply.

The second Marchiennes pit considered a research pit, was started on June 19, 1838, northwest of the Abbaye borehole, near the former Somain–Halluin railway, created in 1874. It is sometimes referred to as the Sainte Barbe pit, the name given to it on August 12, 1838.

Another pit had already been attempted in Marchiennes in the previous century. In 1751 and 1752, the Compagnie Wuillaume-Turner dug a 250-foot-deep (82.20-meter) shaft, which remained in a sinkhole state due to water ingress and the presence of quicksand.

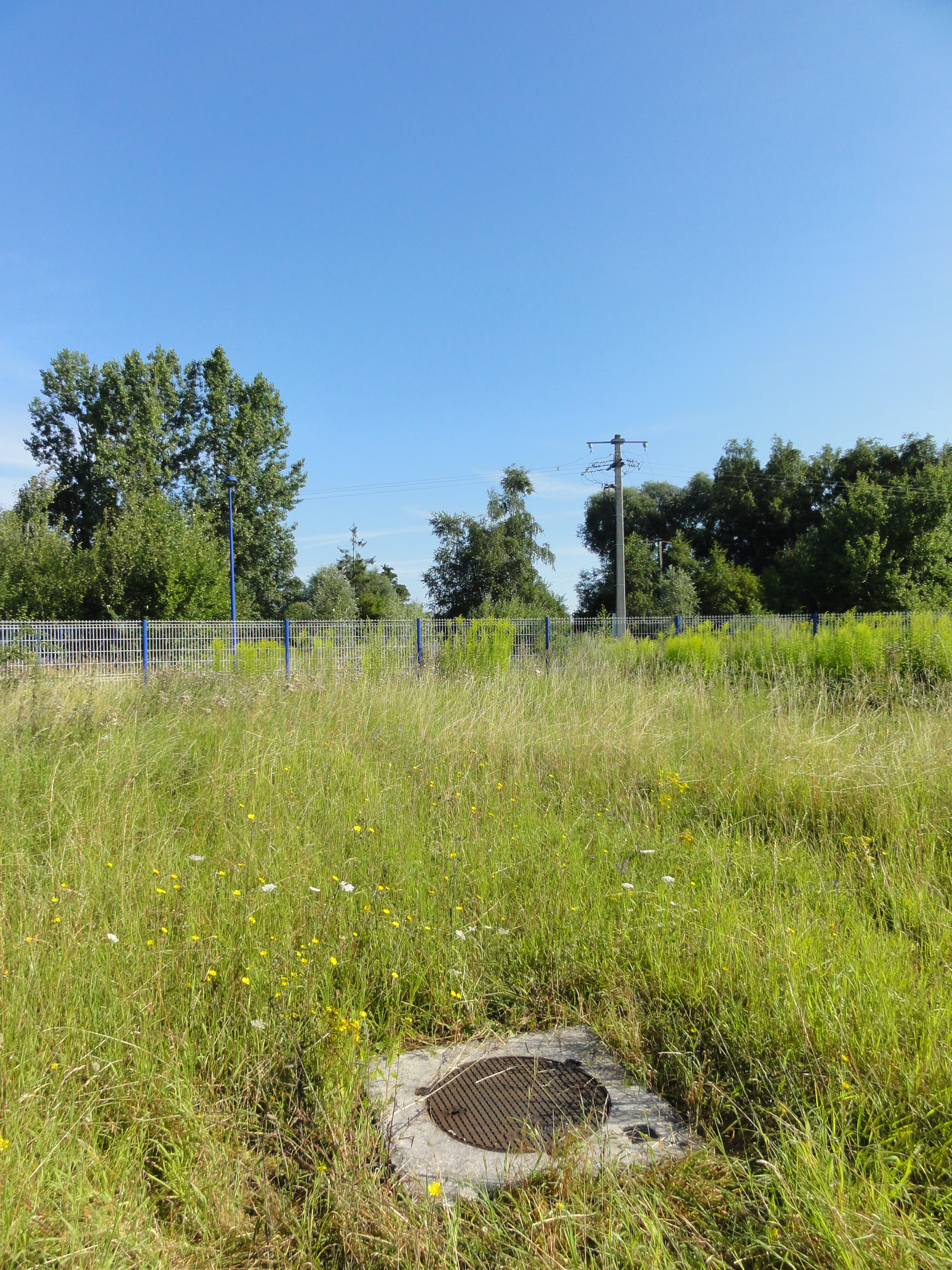
The materialized wellhead of “well 2 Marchiennes.”

The second Marchiennes pit reached the coalfield at 129.41 meters in September 1844. It was subsequently deepened to 195.31 meters. The quicksand was crossed by a masonry tower up to twelve meters. A hook was established at a depth of 178.31 meters. A bowette dug northwards for 200 meters found only a pass of coal, and terrain belonging to the lower part of the coalfield, inclined at 30 to 50°. The southern bowette, 450 meters long, intersected four veins, actually forming only two because of the folds in the terrain. They are forty centimeters thick, which has enabled a small-scale operation to produce 42,458 hectolitres, sold at an average price of one franc per hectoliter. Another source indicates around 4,000 tons of lean, sulfurous coal of poor quality. Believing that the veinlets discovered could be exploited, the research company was transformed into a limited company, Compagnie des Canonniers de Lille, on October 14, 1847. An application for a concession was made on January 19, 1848.

The pit was abandoned in 1850, without the company having been able to obtain a concession, as the deposit did not appear to be of sufficient value or importance. This was the reason for the refusal to grant a concession in January 1850. The loss and subsequent liquidation of the pit were also caused by poor conjecture and severe competition. The considerable expenditure was not profitable. Another reason for the pit's liquidation was that it had not been dug deep enough. For example, the Marchiennes shaft is 195.31 meters deep, but those dug at the same time by the Compagnie des Mines d'Aniche at Aniche, a few kilometers to the south, are deeper, with veins between 200 and 300 meters deep. (Note: Thus, we can notably cite the Sainte Catherine (350 meters), Saint Mathias (276 meters), Saint Laurent (248 meters), Saint Barbe (360 meters), Saint Hyacinthe (273 meters) and Aoust (353 meters) wells, whose exploitation field is between 200 and 350 meters.)

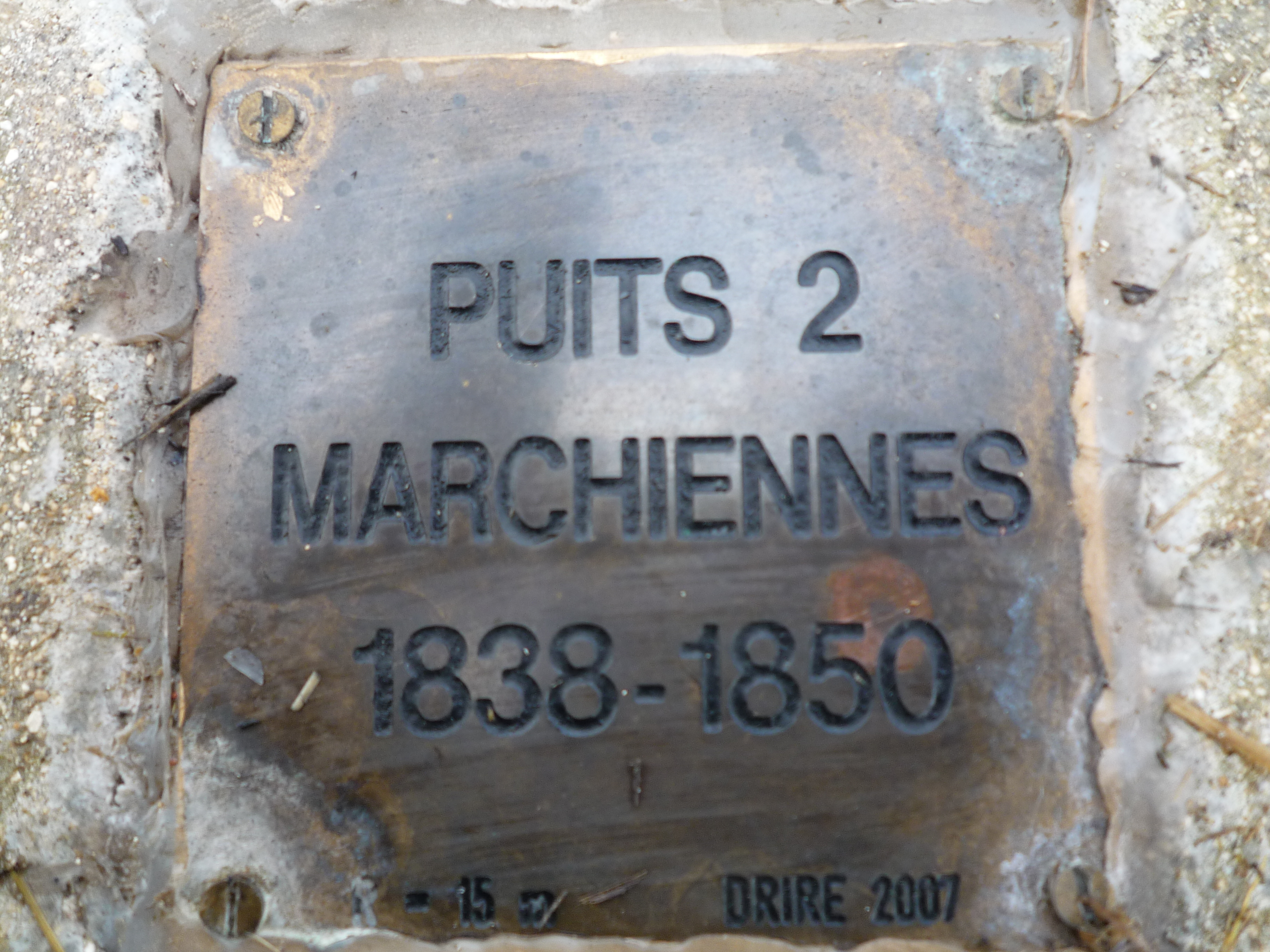
This type of inscription is visible near a large majority of the wells in the mining basin.

On May 22, 1850, the rights and shares of the Compagnie des Canonniers were sold to Jourdan, Nicolle, and Lenglin. They set up a new company, the Compagnie de Marchiennes, which was unsuccessful.

The Marchiennes pit had no major impact on the commune. The population rose from 2,614 in 1836, to 2,848 in 1841, 2,965 in 1846, and 3,047 in 1851. The population has certainly increased, but only in proportion to other periods since 1793. No housing was built to accommodate the workers.

A sugar mill was then set up on the pit site, followed by a wire-drawing mill. In the 20th century, the five-meter-diameter well was used to supply water to the wire-drawing plant, which required 200 m³ per day. The water level was twelve to thirteen meters deep in 1957, and the measured depth of the structure was 35 meters. In 2007, the DRIRE installed a materialized wellhead, enabling monitoring of water and embankment levels, as well as gas pressure. It now stands in the middle of the roundabout on the Tréfilerie industrial estate. It is called “Puits 2 Marchiennes.”

== See also ==
- Lille
- Marchiennes
- Nord-Pas de Calais Mining Basin

== Bibliography ==
- Vuillemin, Émile (1880). Le Bassin Houiller du Pas-de-Calais, Tome II : Histoire de la recherche, de la découverte et de l'exploitation de la houille dans ce nouveau bassin [The Pas-de-Calais Coal Basin, Volume II: History of the research, discovery and exploitation of coal in this new basin] (in French). Lille: Imprimerie L. Danel. pp. 368–369.
- Vuillemin, Émile (1883). Le Bassin Houiller du Pas-de-Calais, Tome III [The Pas-de-Calais Coal Basin, Volume III] (in French). Lille: Imprimerie L. Danel. pp. 72–73, 103.
- Burat, Amédée (1851). De la houille, traité théorique et pratique des combustibles minéraux (houille, anthracite, lignite, etc) [Coal, theoretical and practical treatise on mineral fuels (coal, anthracite, lignite, etc.)] (in French). Paris: Langlois et Leclercq. p. 477.
- Olry, Albert (1886). Bassin houiller de Valenciennes, partie comprise dans le département du Nord [Valenciennes coal basin, part included in the Nord department] (in French). Paris: Imprimerie Quantin.
- Dumont, Gérard; Debrabant, Valérie (2007). Les 3 âges de la mine, t. 2, L'Ere du charbon roi 1830-1914 [The 3 Ages of Mining, Vol. 2, The Age of King Coal 1830-1914] (in French). Lille: La Voix du Nord. p. 51. ISBN 978-2843931086.
- Cherrier, A.; Clauzel, D.; Demolon, P.; Desmulliez, J.; Lefebvre, B.; Marchand, P.; Vermander, P.; Wytteman, J.-P. (1988). "Le Nord, de la Préhistoire à nos jours" [The North, from Prehistory to the Present Day]. Revue du Nord (in French). 282–283. Bordessoules: Saint-Jean-d'Angeli: 1069–1070. ISBN 978-2-903504-28-1.
