= Stade Bollaert-Delelis =

Football stadium in Lens, France

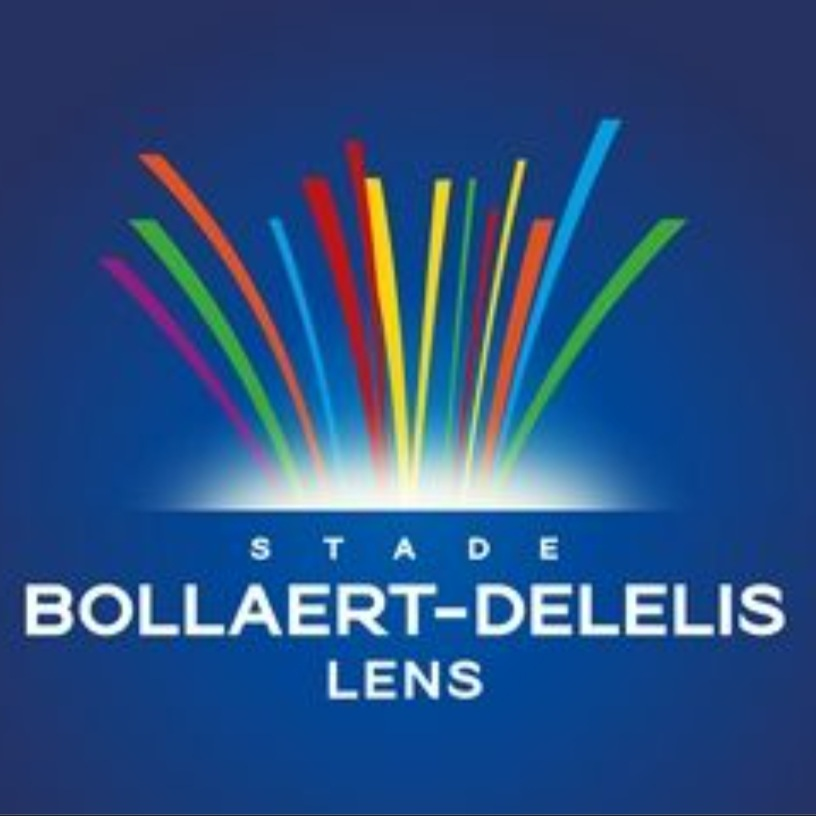

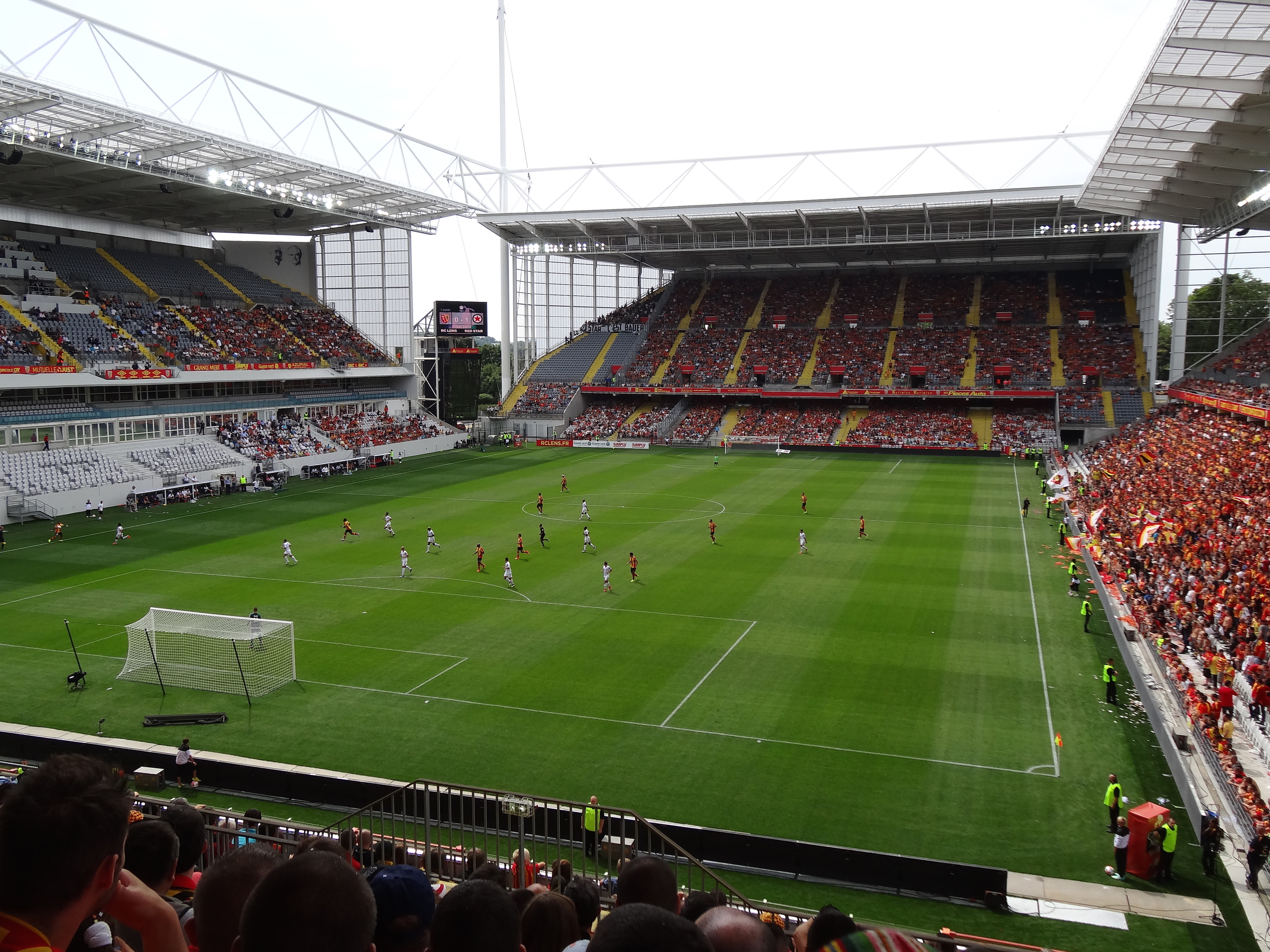
- Interactive map of Stade Bollaert-Delelis
- Former names: Stade Félix-Bollaert (1933–2012)
- Address: Avenue Alfred Maes
- Location: Lens, France
- Coordinates: 50°25′58″N 2°48′54″E
- Capacity: 38,223 (after renovation)

Construction
- Opened: 18 June 1933
- Renovated: 1995–1997; 2014–2015
- Architect: Gustave Spriet

Tenant
- RC Lens (1933–present)

The Stade Bollaert-Delelis (French pronunciation: [stad bɔlaʁt dələlis]) is the main football stadium in Lens, France, that was built in 1933. It is the home of RC Lens. The stadium's capacity is 38,223 – about 7,000 more than the city's population. The stadium was originally named after Félix Bollaert, a director of Compagnie des Mines de Lens who was anxious to promote the development of sports clubs in the city. Construction began in 1931, but Bollaert had died shortly before the stadium's inauguration. It was renamed Stade Bollaert-Delelis in 2012 after the death of André Delelis, the former mayor of the city who was politician who served as the Minister of Commerce under President François Mitterrand.

== History ==
The stadium has hosted matches in the following major international tournaments:

- 1984 European Championship
- 1998 FIFA World Cup
- 1999 Rugby World Cup
- 2007 Rugby World Cup
- 2016 European Championship

In 2025, RC Lens took over ownership of the stadium from the city of Lens.

== Architecture ==
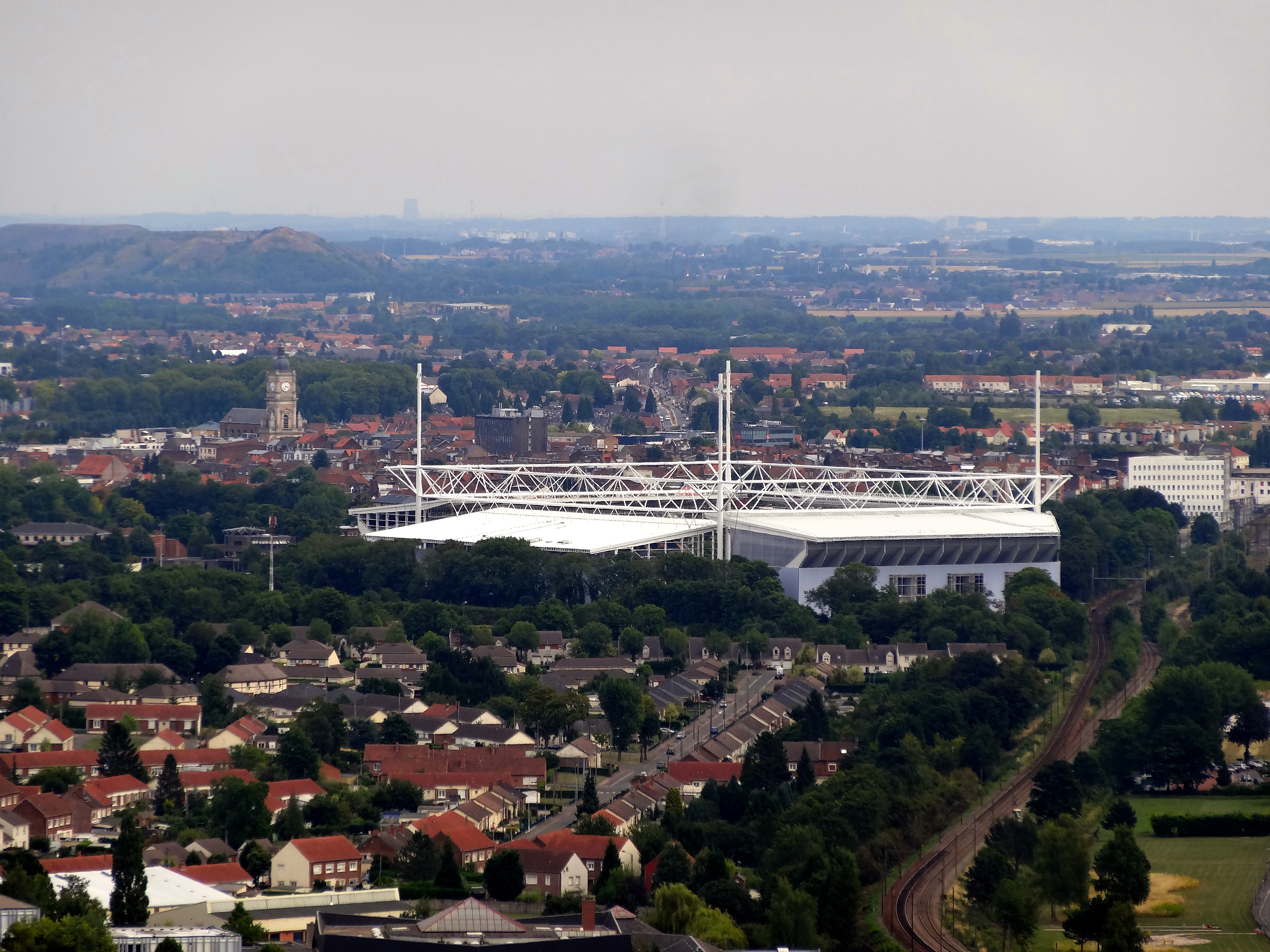
The renovated stadium.

The stadium is constructed in the English style with four separate stands dedicated respectively to:

- Henri Trannin, native of Bully-les-Mines, Goalkeeper at the club for 18 years, sports director for Lens from 1952 to 1956, dying in July 1974; it was dedicated on 4 December 1976
- Tony Marek, former player and coach, international in the 1950s (lower part) and Xercès Louis, former player, first French international player from the Antilles (upper part);
- Élie Delacourt, former fans' group president;
- Max Lepagnot, former president of the district of Artois.

Until 15 September 2018, all parts of the stadium contained seating. However, most supporters in the Marek, being a side stand, used to keep standing during the games as it is considered the kop and are considered as the most fervent supporters in the stadium, which makes the stadium different from most of the other stadiums, as the most fervent fans tend to usually sit behind the nets. Since 15 September 2018, the Marek contains a standing area again, as well as the lower parts of the Trannin and Delacourt stands since the start of the 2022–2023 season. The stadium's capacity is now 38,223.

== Events ==
=== UEFA Euro 1984 ===
Date	Team #1	Res.	Team #2	Round
13 June 1984	Belgium	2–0	Yugoslavia	Group A
17 June 1984	West Germany	2–1	Romania	Group B

=== 1998 FIFA World Cup ===
The stadium was one of the venues of the 1998 FIFA World Cup, and held the following matches:

Date	Team #1	Res.	Team #2	Round
12 June 1998	Saudi Arabia	0–1	Denmark	Group C
14 June 1998	Jamaica	1–3	Croatia	Group H
21 June 1998	Germany	2–2	FR Yugoslavia	Group F
24 June 1998	Spain	6–1	Bulgaria	Group D
26 June 1998	Colombia	0–2	England	Group G
28 June 1998	France	1–0	Paraguay	Round of 16

=== 1999 Rugby World Cup ===
Date	Team #1	Res.	Team #2	Round
20 October 1999	Ireland	24–28	Argentina	Play-off Stage

=== 2007 Rugby World Cup ===
Date	Team #1	Res.	Team #2	Round
8 September 2007	England	28–10	United States	Group A
22 September 2007	South Africa	30–25	Tonga	Group A
26 September 2007	Georgia	30–0	Namibia	Group D

=== UEFA Euro 2016 ===
In May 2011, the stadium was designated to host the 2016 European Football Championship. Due to renovations before the tournament, the stadium was closed during the 2014–2015 season.

Date	Time (CET)	Team #1	Result	Team #2	Round	Attendance
11 June 2016	15:00	Albania	0–1	Switzerland	Group A	33,805
16 June 2016	15:00	England	2–1	Wales	Group B	34,033
21 June 2016	21:00	Czech Republic	0–2	Turkey	Group D	32,836
25 June 2016	21:00	Croatia	0–1	Portugal	Round of 16	33,523

=== Other uses ===
The France national team has played eight matches at the stadium without defeat. Lille played two UEFA Champions League campaigns there when their own stadium was deemed inadequate, in (2001–02 and 2006–07). It hosted the Johnny Hallyday concert in 2009 and a Jehovah's Witnesses gathering in 2006, which created controversy. The stadium is the setting for a scene in the movie Bienvenue chez les Ch'tis, shot during a match between Lens and Nice in April 2007. The song "Les corons" is sung by the public at the end of halftime break.

In 2012 the Stadium held a rugby League match between France and Wales as part of an Autumn International Series match. 11,278 fans came to watch the game.
