= Hasnon =

- Commune
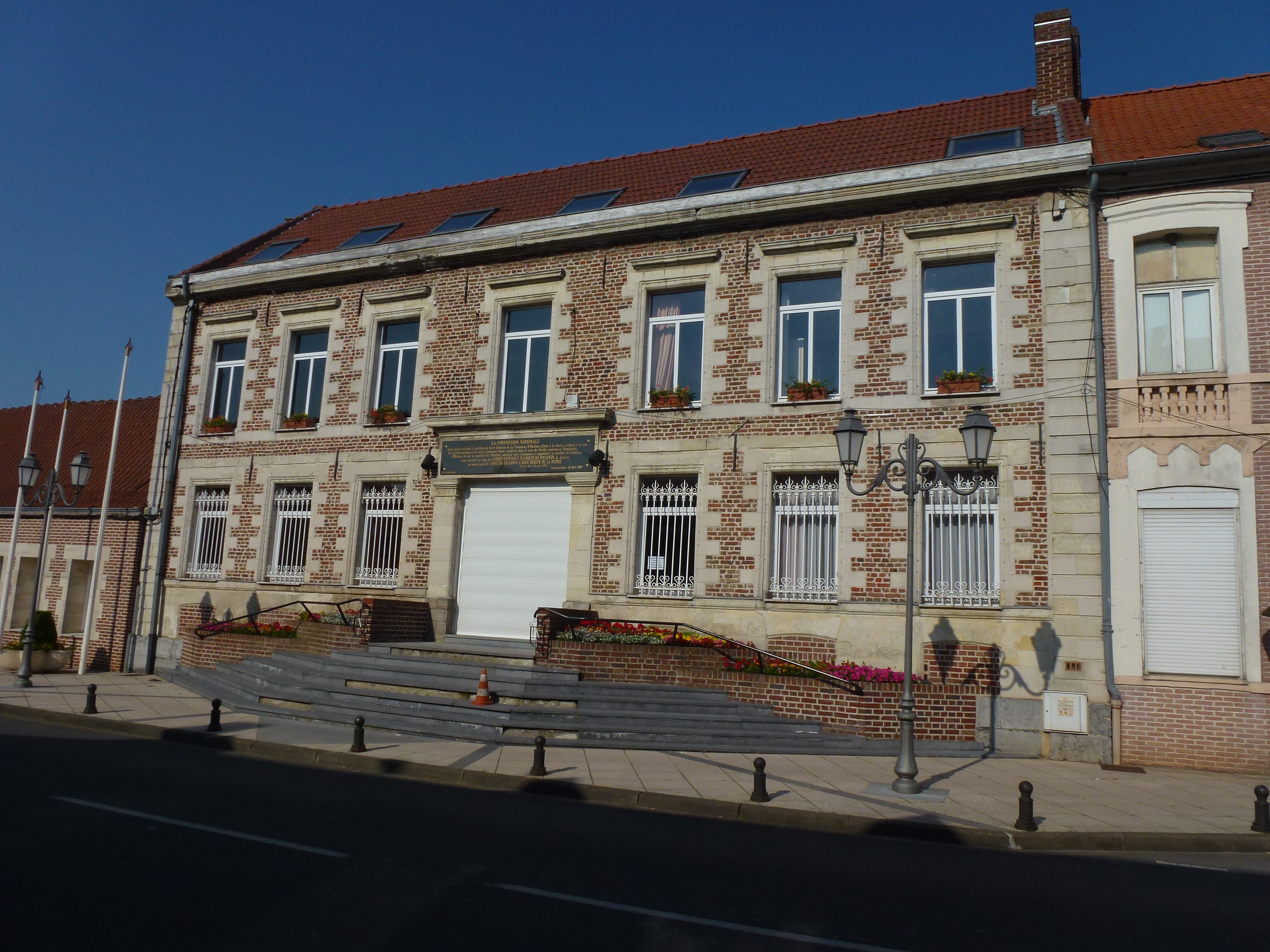
- The town hall in Hasnon

- Coat of arms
- Location of Hasnon
- Location within France Location within Hauts-de-France
- Coordinates: 50°25′16″N 3°23′13″E
- Country: France
- Region: Hauts-de-France
- Department: Nord
- Arrondissement: Valenciennes
- Canton: Saint-Amand-les-Eaux
- Intercommunality: CA Porte du Hainaut

Government
  - Mayor (2020–2026): André Desmedt
- Area^{1}: 12.74 km^{2} (4.92 sq mi)
- Elevation: 19 m (62 ft)
- Highest elevation: 21 m (69 ft)
- Lowest elevation: 14 m (46 ft)
- Population (2023): 3,849
  - Density: 302.1/km^{2} (782.5/sq mi)
- Time zone: UTC+01:00 (CET)
  - Summer (DST): UTC+02:00 (CEST)
- INSEE/Postal code: 59284 /59178
- ^{1} French Land Register data, which excludes lakes, ponds, glaciers > 1 km^{2} (0.386 sq mi or 247 acres) and river estuaries.

Hasnon (French pronunciation: [anɔ̃]) is a commune in the Nord department in northern France.

== Population ==
Historical population
Year	Pop.	±% p.a.
1968	3,275	—
1975	3,271	−0.02%
1982	3,395	+0.53%
1990	3,271	−0.46%
1999	3,180	−0.31%
2007	3,254	+0.29%
2012	3,839	+3.36%
2017	3,862	+0.12%
2023	3,849	−0.06%
Source: INSEE

== Heraldry ==
Arms of Hasnon	The arms of Hasnon are blazoned : Per fess 1: Azure, a bend between 2 swords inverted argent; 2: Sable, a key argent.

== See also ==
- Communes of the Nord department
- Hasnon Company
