= Coron (house) =

Type of working-class housing found in France and Belgium

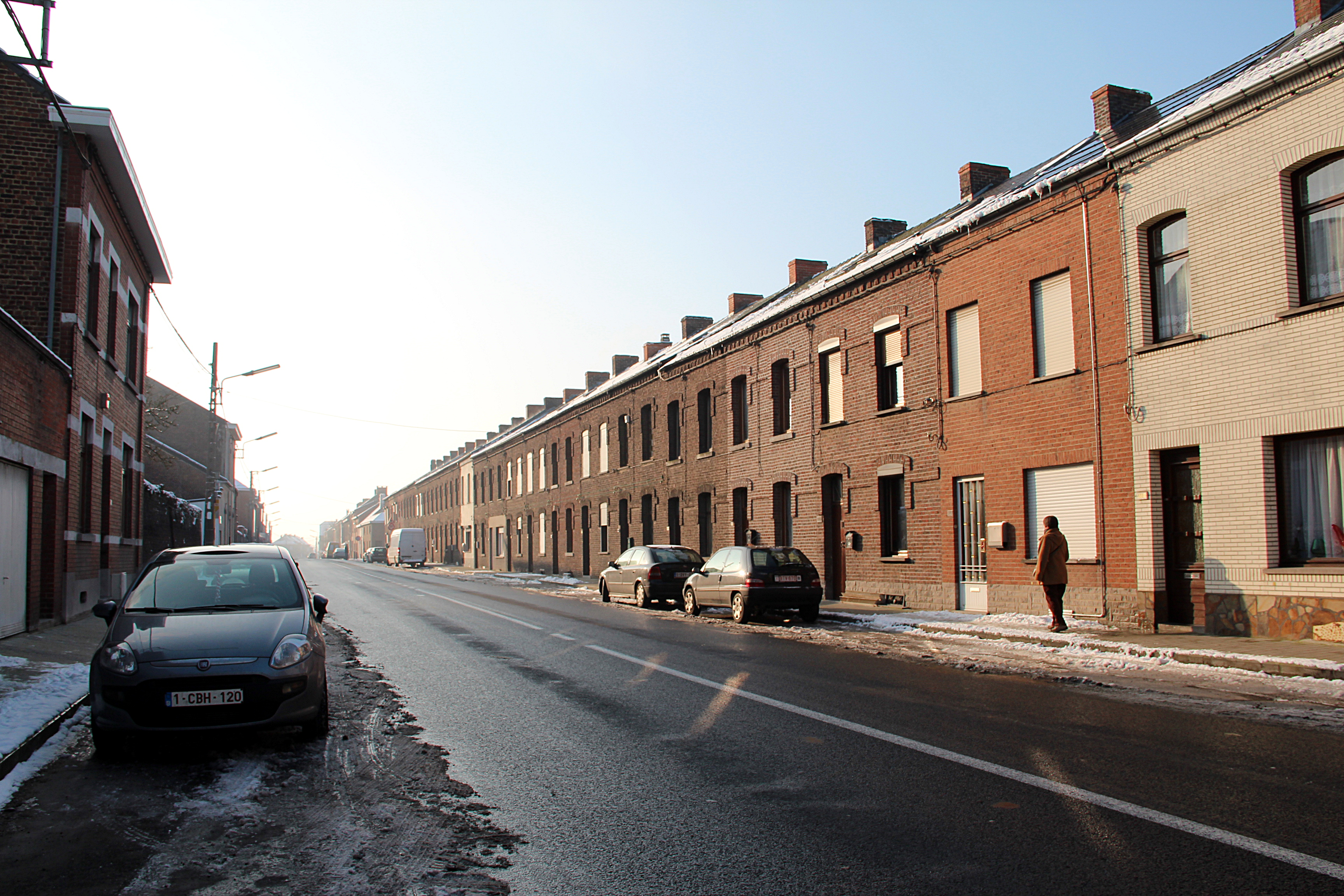
Corons at Havré, Belgium built to accommodate coal miners

In urbanism, a coron is a historical type of working-class housing found in Northern France and Belgium. Emerging during the Industrial Revolution, corons were a form of low-cost dwelling commonly found in coal mining and steelmaking regions of Wallonia and the Nord-Pas-de-Calais. Originating as a form of vernacular architecture, their design and materials were increasingly upgraded over time and some were even constructed as parts of purpose-built model villages. They can be considered a counterpart of the back-to-back housing found in industrial parts of the United Kingdom.

Over a hundred coron sites are listed as World Heritage Sites in Northern France selected by the United Nations Educational, Scientific and Cultural Organization (UNESCO).

== Origins and etymology ==
The term originates from the Walloon language 'coron' (itself from Latin 'cornus' meaning 'corner') denoting the edge or corner of a street and, by extrapolation, a working-class district. The emergence of the corons was instigated in the nineteenth century in metropolitan France’s Northern Departments now constituting the Hauts-de-France region (French pronunciation: [o d(ə) fʁɑ̃s], translating to "Upper France" in English; Picard: Heuts-d'Franche), following the territorial reform of French Regions (2014) from a merger of Nord-Pas-de-Calais and Picardy. The activity was ubiquitous in the towns of the former Nord-Pas de Calais Mining Basin including Lewarde and the Fosse Arenberg sites.

== Description ==
Different types of corons coexisted. Some represented real advances for the time in terms of protecting inhabitants from cholera outbreaks. Today, successive renovations make corons sought after.

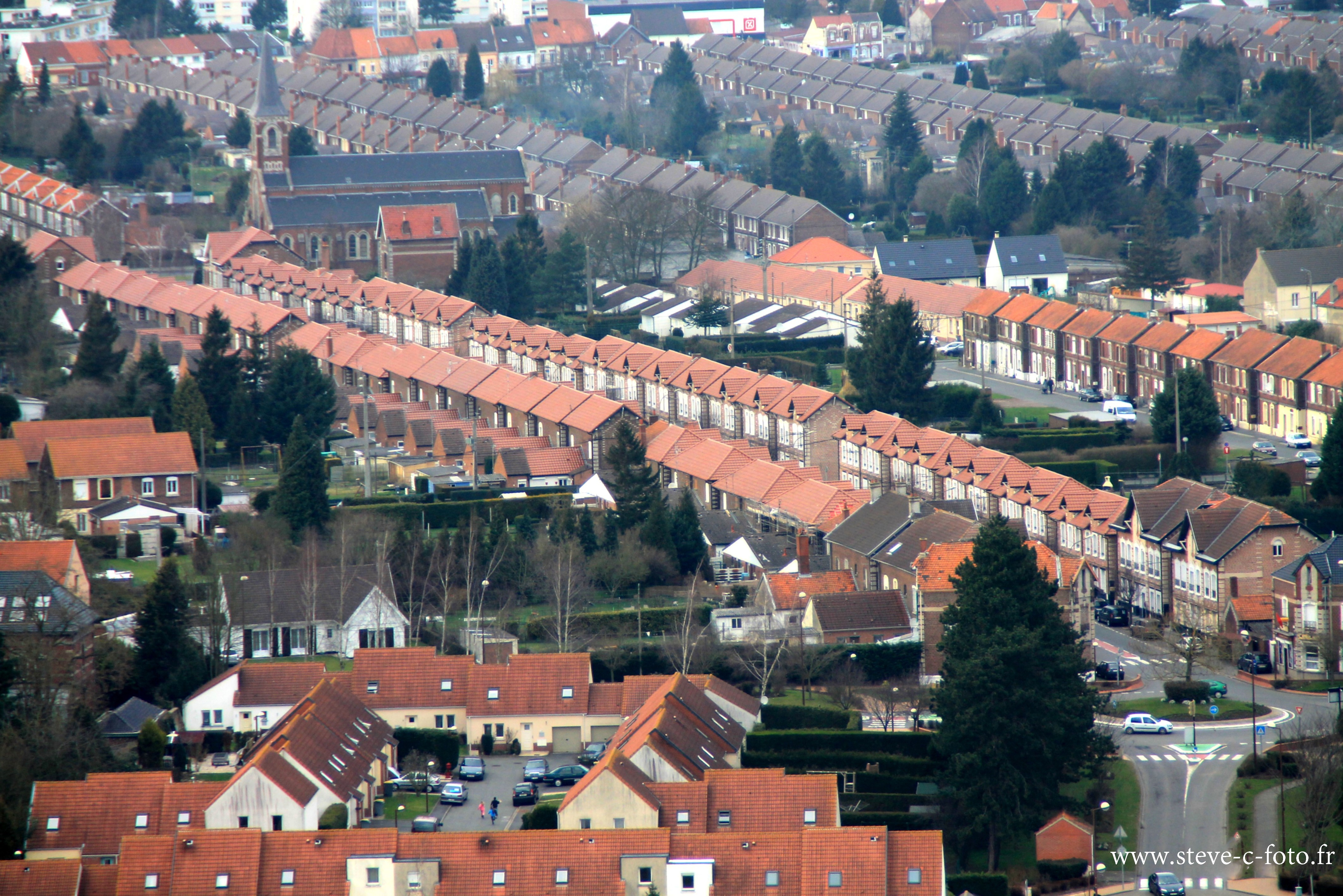

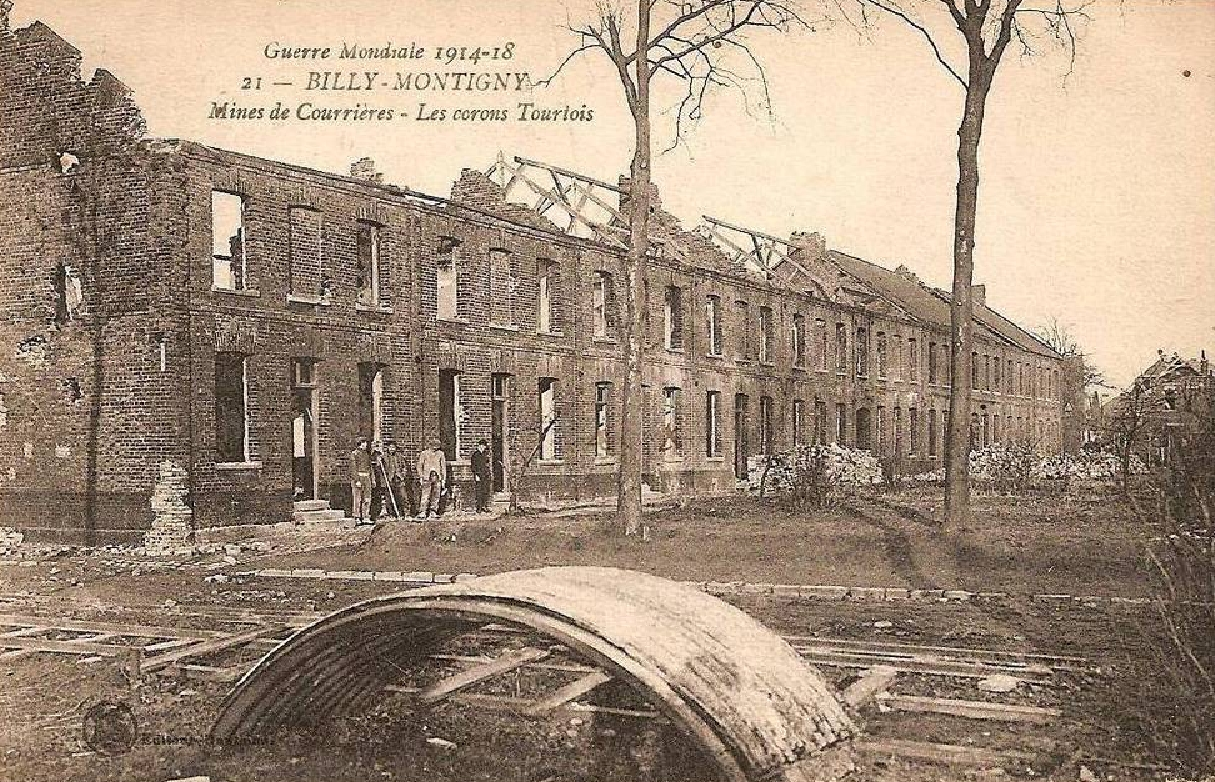

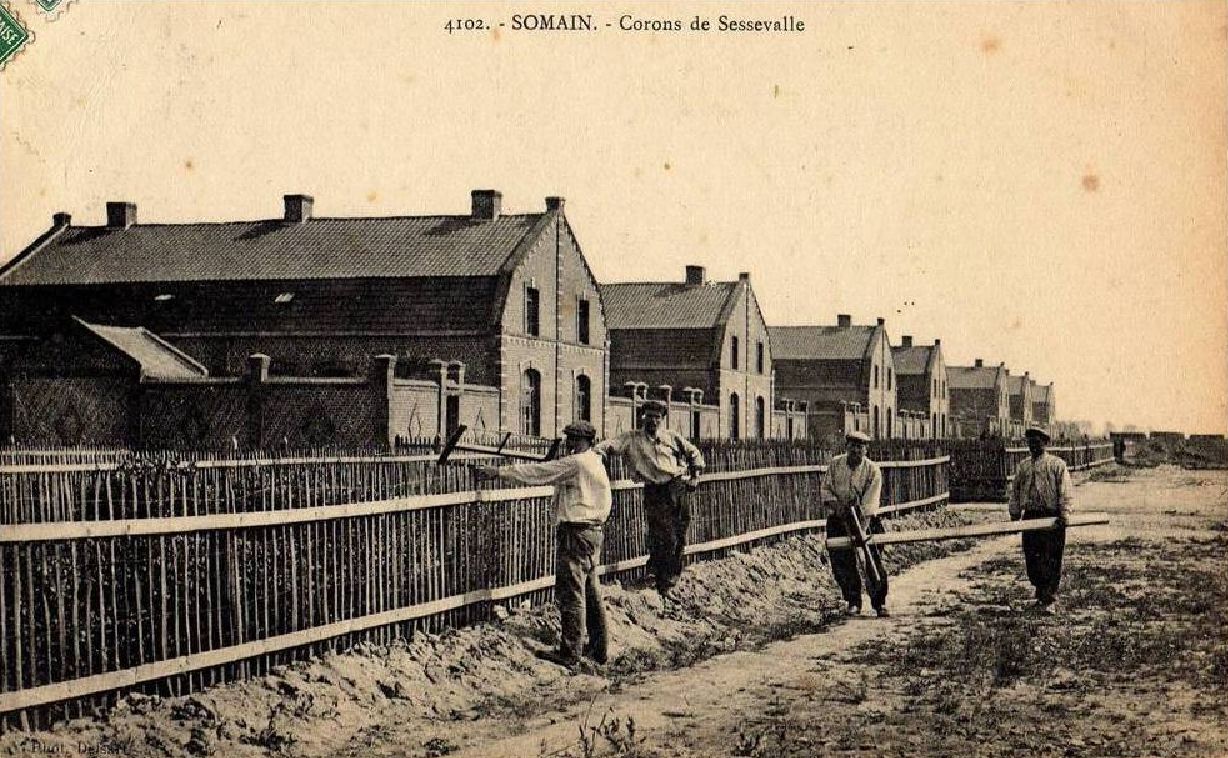

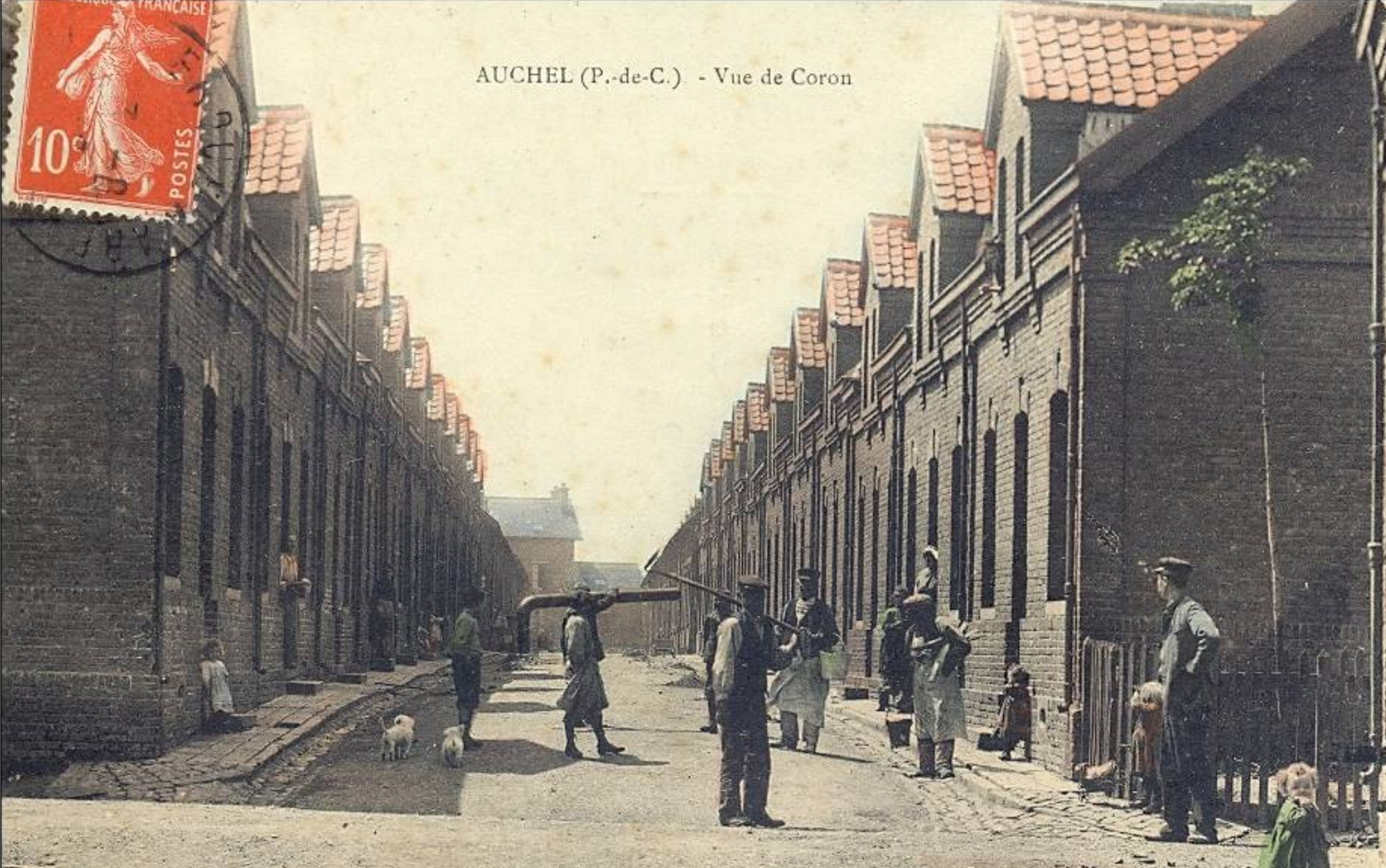

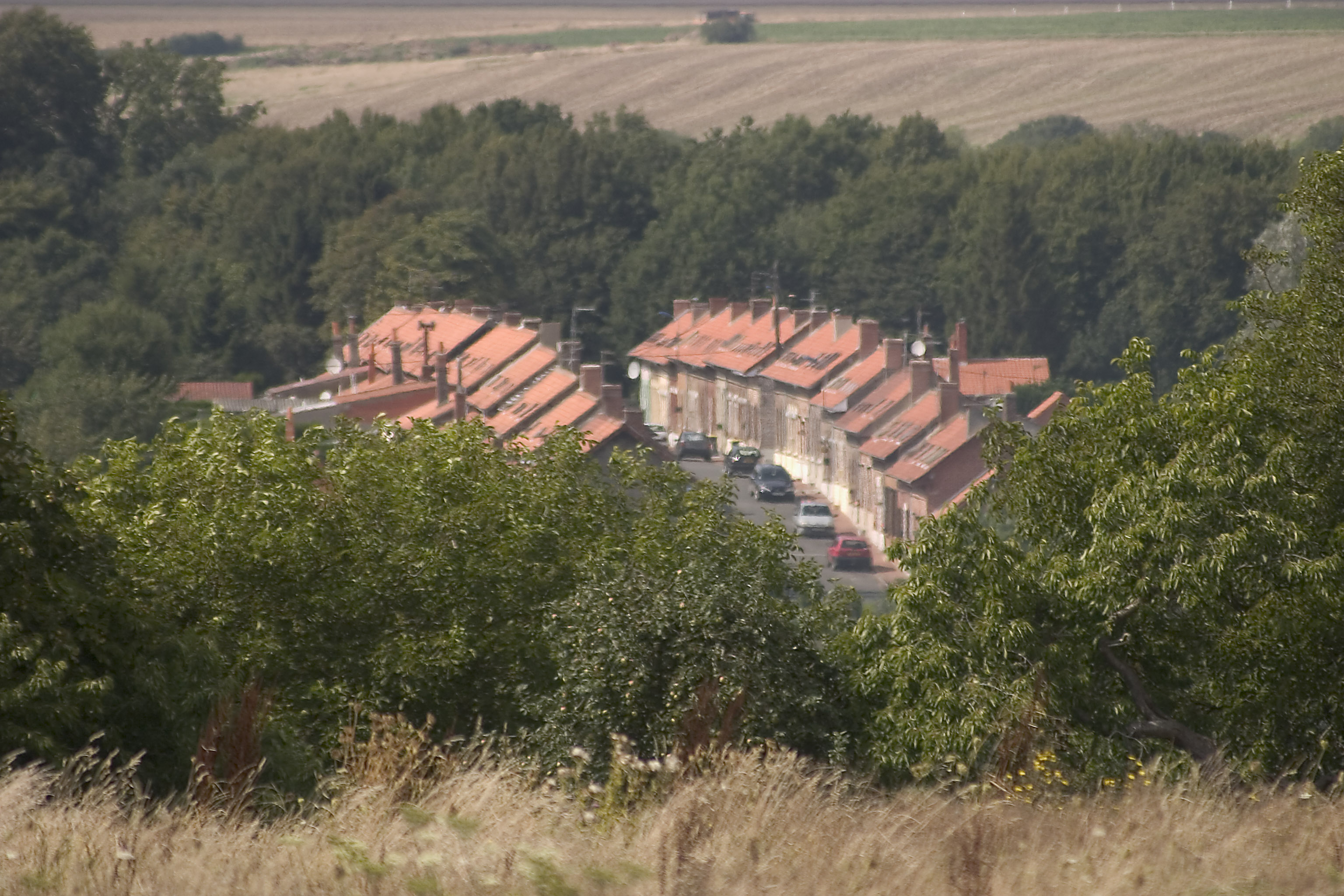

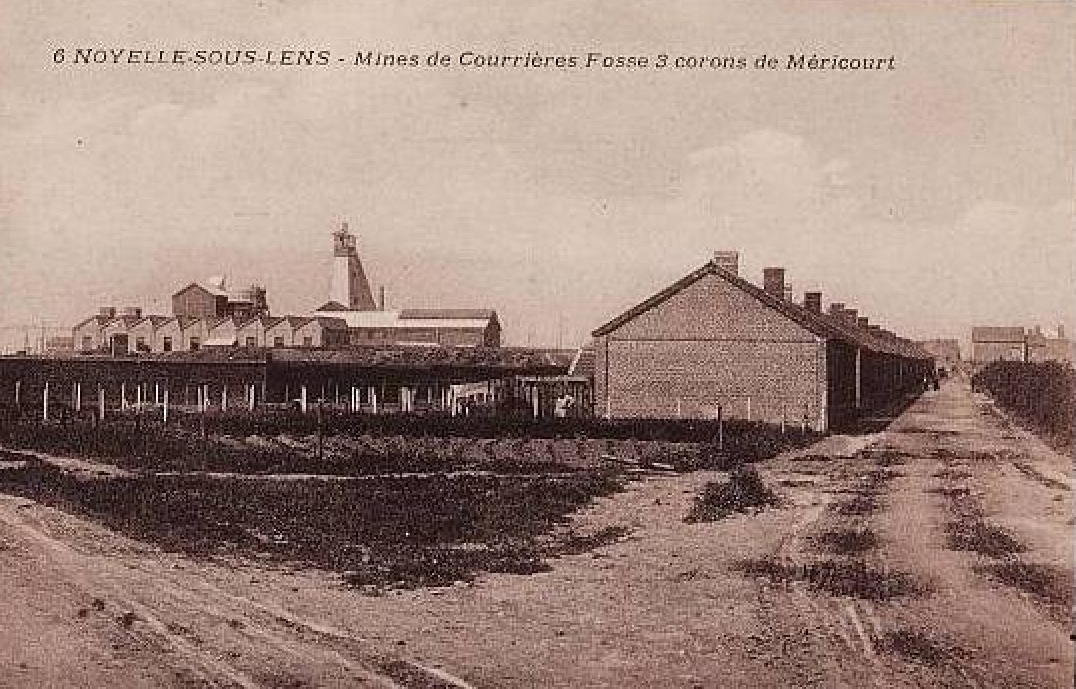

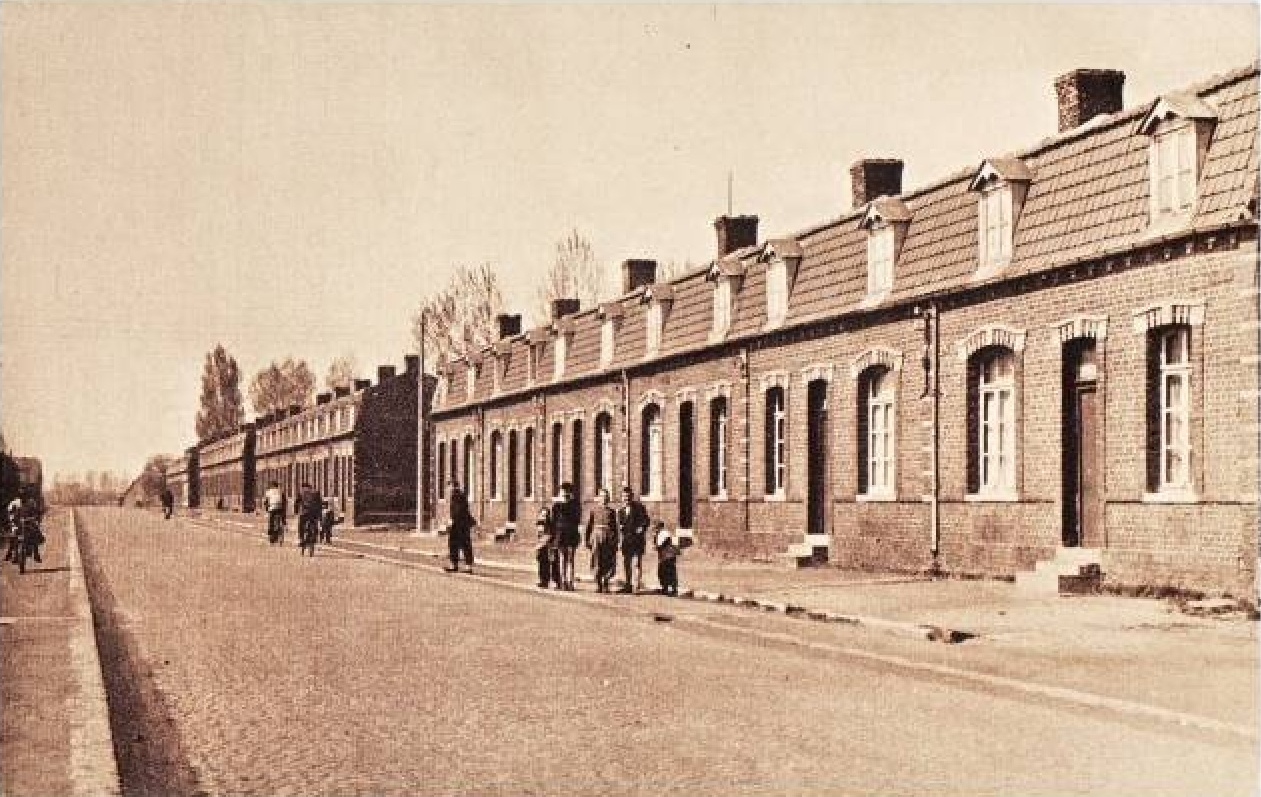

== Popular culture ==
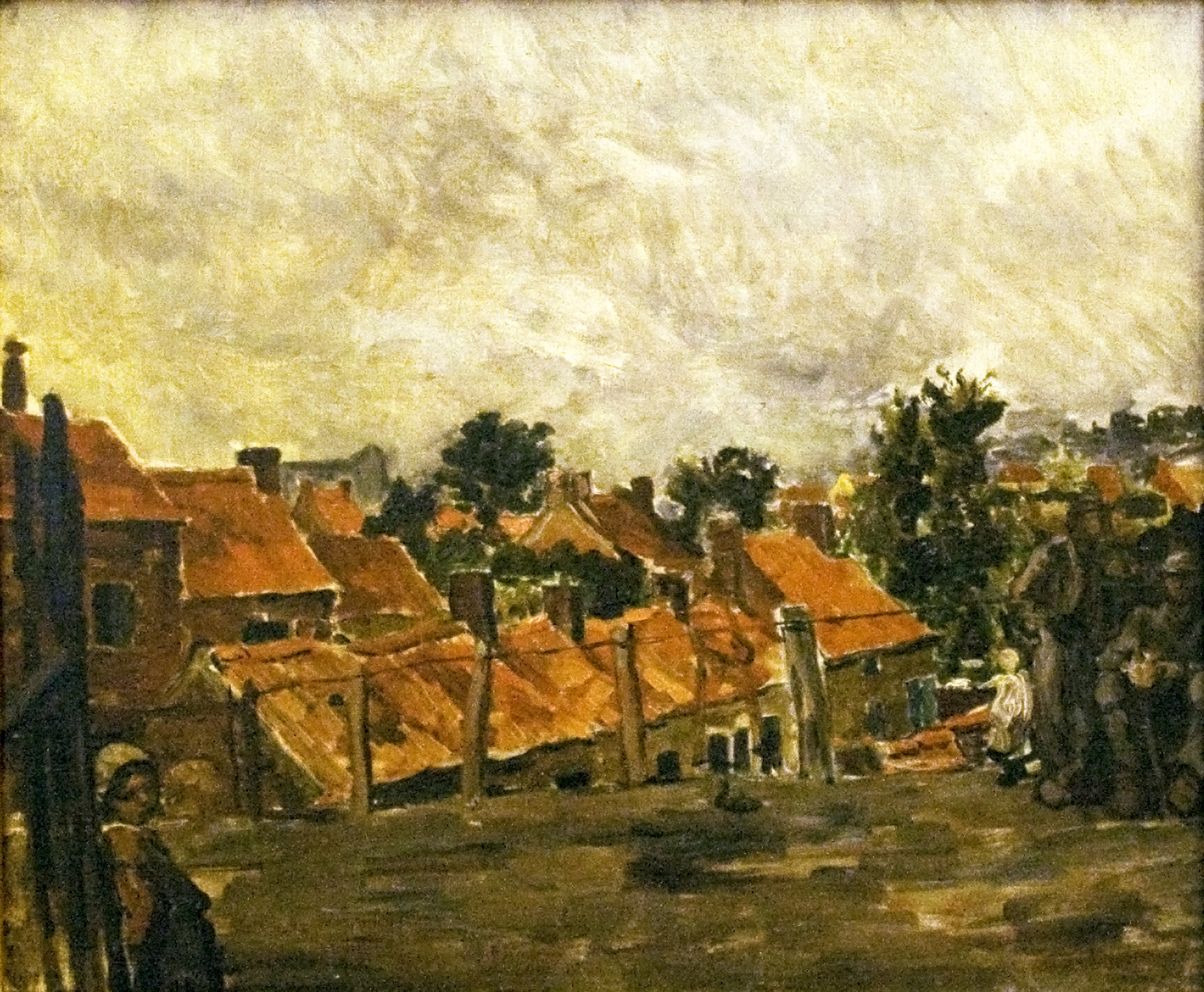
The Roofs of the Coron, houses of the mine workers by Belgian painter Constantin Meunier (1831–1905)

- "Les Corons" is a famous French song by Pierre Bachelet written by Jean-Pierre Lang and composed by Bachelet himself. It became the regional hymn for the Northern miners of France by describing their pride and struggles while integrating folklore. The supporters of the football club RC Lens chant it before a match.
- Émile Zola's 1885 novel Germinal is set against the detailed description of the living and working conditions of a poor mining community in northern France.
