= Hasnon Company =

French coal exploration enterprise

- Founded: 1837
- Defunct: 1845 ( Bought out by Anzin)
- Headquarters: Hasnon, France
- Products: Any
- Services: Coal search
- Footnotes / references Key dates *1838: sinking of the Tertres shaft begins *1839: sinking of the Prés Barrés shaft begins *1840: sinking of the Boules shaft begins *1841: Tertres and Prés Barrés wells abandoned *1844: Boules shaft abandoned

The Hasnon Company, founded in 1837, was a French bituminous coal exploration enterprise. Despite its efforts, it conducted numerous surveys and opened three pits in Hasnon and Wallers in 1839 and 1840, within the Nord-Pas-de-Calais mining basin. Additionally, the company held a 25% stake in the Vicoigne Company from 1841 to 1843. In February 1843, the third exploratory shaft was abandoned. The company conducted two final surveys after 1843 and the onset of 1844; however, these results proved inconclusive, and operations were terminated in 1845, coinciding with the dissolution of the Hasnon Company. The concession remained unexploited and was subsequently acquired by the Anzin Mining Company, which had previously purchased Hasnon's shares in the Vicoigne Company in 1843. Anzin left the concession dormant until around 1875 when it attempted to open a pit. Subsequent exploration of the Hasnon concession has not been undertaken.

== Historical context ==
The 1830s and 1840s were marked by a significant surge in the establishment of industrial enterprises, particularly in the mining sector. Within the Nord region, this proliferation of activity followed the discovery of substantial reserves of bituminous coal by the recently formed Douchy Mining Company. A share in the company, initially sold for a mere 2,230 francs in February 1833, escalated to an astonishing 300,000 francs by January 1834. This surge in demand for the region's coal resources led to a proliferation of concession applications, with as many as 70 applications submitted in 1837 alone. However, this economic boom was not without its challenges, as many of these newly formed companies could not withstand the competitive pressures and ultimately ceased operations.

In this euphoric climate, property owners from Douai formed a company around 1833, which conducted several surveys in Hasnon in 1834 and 1835 with the assistance of the Douchy Company. (Note: Vuillemin 1883, p. 101) Some members of this group conducted a separate survey in Auby, near Douai. This survey was abandoned at a depth of 140 meters after an accident. Had the endeavor persisted, it was probable that the coal-bearing terrain and coal itself would have been reached.

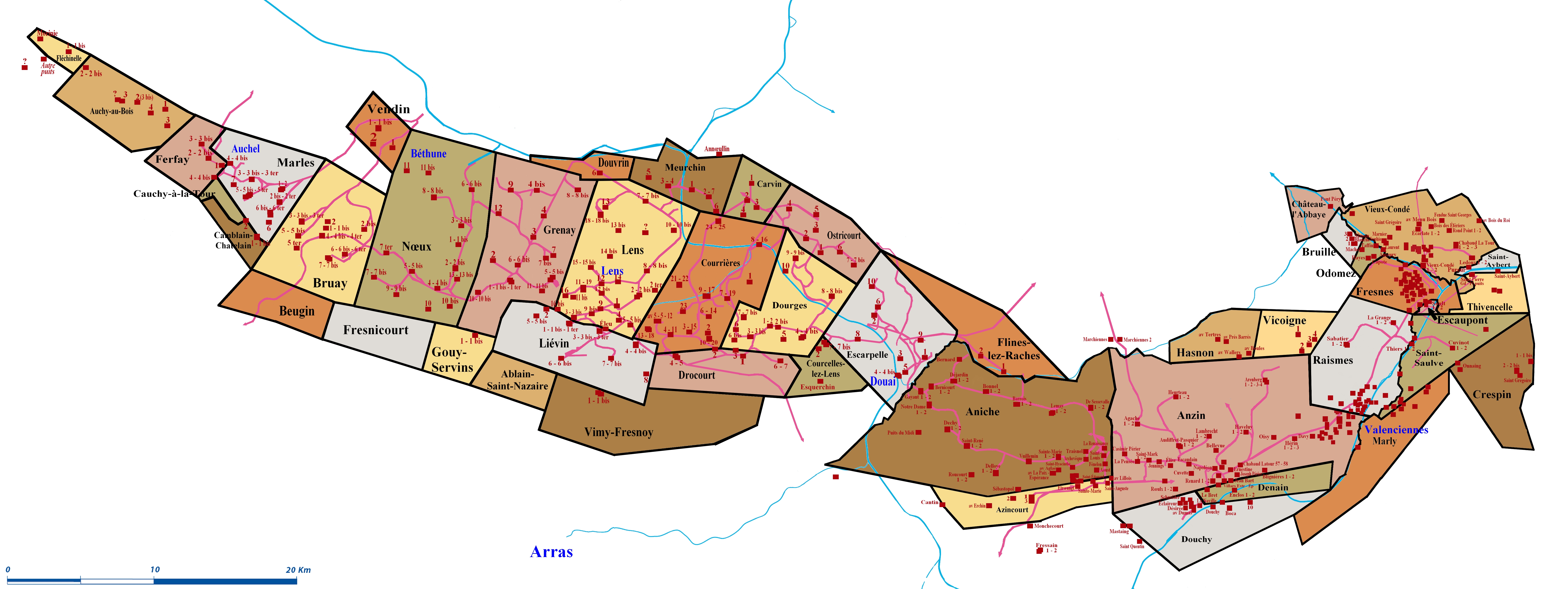
The Hasnon concession among those in the coalfield.

The Hasnon Company, an exploitation company founded in 1837 with a capital of 1,200,000 francs, was established by two survey entrepreneurs, banker Louis Dupont and an associate. The company opened three pits in Hasnon and Wallers, which encountered the lower part of the coal formation but unsuccessfully exploited thin coal seams. (Note: Olry 1886, p. 175) While conducting surveys, the Hasnon Company successively opened the Tertres, Prés Barrés, and Bouils pits. These pits revealed drift galleries, but their mineral content was found to be insufficient for profitable exploitation, (Note: Olry 1886, p. 176) ultimately leading to their abandonment. Concurrently, the Hasnon Company was granted a concession, known as the Hasnon concession, at the onset of 1840.

While the Hasnon Company was engaged in the pursuit of coal deposits, other companies and organizations were undertaking exploratory endeavors in the vicinity. To the west, in 1838, the Lille Cannoneers Company initiated the development of the Marchiennes pit following the completion of several surveys since 1835. Concurrently, the Société de Saint-Hubert conducted a series of surveys in the northwest. In the east, the Cambrai Company initiated the Boitelle pit in Raismes in 1839, (Note: Olry 1886, p. 166) while the Escaut Company opened the le Bret (Note: Olry 1886, p. 168) and Évrard pits (Note: Olry 1886, p. 167) and the Bruille Company opened the Ewbank pit in the same area. The Hasnon Company did not engage in any research activities near Vicoigne, although it did submit a concession request. These four companies subsequently merged, forming the Vicoigne Company on October 1, 1841, which obtained a concession rich in lean coal in September 1841. (Note: Wolff 1993, p. 252) To the south, the Anzin Mining Company opened pits in Denain and Escaudain. (Note: After discovering coal in 1826 at the Villars pit in Denain, the Anzin Mining Company opened the Saint Mark pit in Escaudain in 1830, followed by Bayard, Jean Bart, and Mathilde in 1831, Orléans in 1832, Napoléon in 1833, Casimir in 1835, Renard in 1836 in Denain, Jennings in 1837 and Escaudain in 1838 in Escaudain, Ernestine and Joseph Périer in 1841, and Chabaud la Tour in 1842 in Denain.) The Hasnon Company thus owned a quarter of the Vicoigne Company. In 1843, the Anzin Mining Company acquired the Hasnon Company, thereby obtaining a quarter share of the Vicoigne Company and gaining the right to appoint two of its eight administrators. (Note: Wolff 1993, p. 288)

Following a series of unsuccessful outcomes, the company, disheartened, resolved to abandon the concession. However, after consulting Chief Engineer Blavier, it undertook two final surveys. (Note: Olry 1886, p. 177) The first, at Rouges-Carrières, yielded only traces of coal, while the second, at the Drève de Wallers, encountered a completely barren coal formation.

In early 1845, the Hasnon Company declared its concession idle and subsequently sold its shares to the Anzin Mining Company. Concurrently, surveys conducted by the Société de Société de Saint-Hubert revealed that the concession was situated in a region of particularly poor coal-bearing terrain. (Note: Olry 1886, p. 178)

For the subsequent three decades, no further exploratory endeavors were undertaken within the designated concession area. However, around 1875, the Anzin Mining Company initiated a plan to establish an excavation site, designated as the Avaleresse de Wallers, in proximity to the southernmost boundary of the Hasnon concession. The primary objective of this initiative was not the extraction of Hasnon's inherent mineral deposits but rather the intersection of the southern extension of the Vieux-Condé and Vicoigne veins, which were situated within the Anzin concession. The procurement of land was initiated, and excavation for the shaft commenced; however, work was promptly suspended and never resumed. The pit remained at the stage of an "avaleresse," defined as an initial exploratory shaft.

At the beginning of the 21st century, all traces of the three pits opened by the Hasnon Company had been eradicated. In contrast to other pits within different concessions, which are subject to annual or biennial monitoring by the Bureau of Geological and Mining Research for variables such as fill level, water level, and gas pressure, no such monitoring took place at the aforementioned three pits. Furthermore, the shaft heads at these pits have not been marked, which is standard practice.

== Pits ==
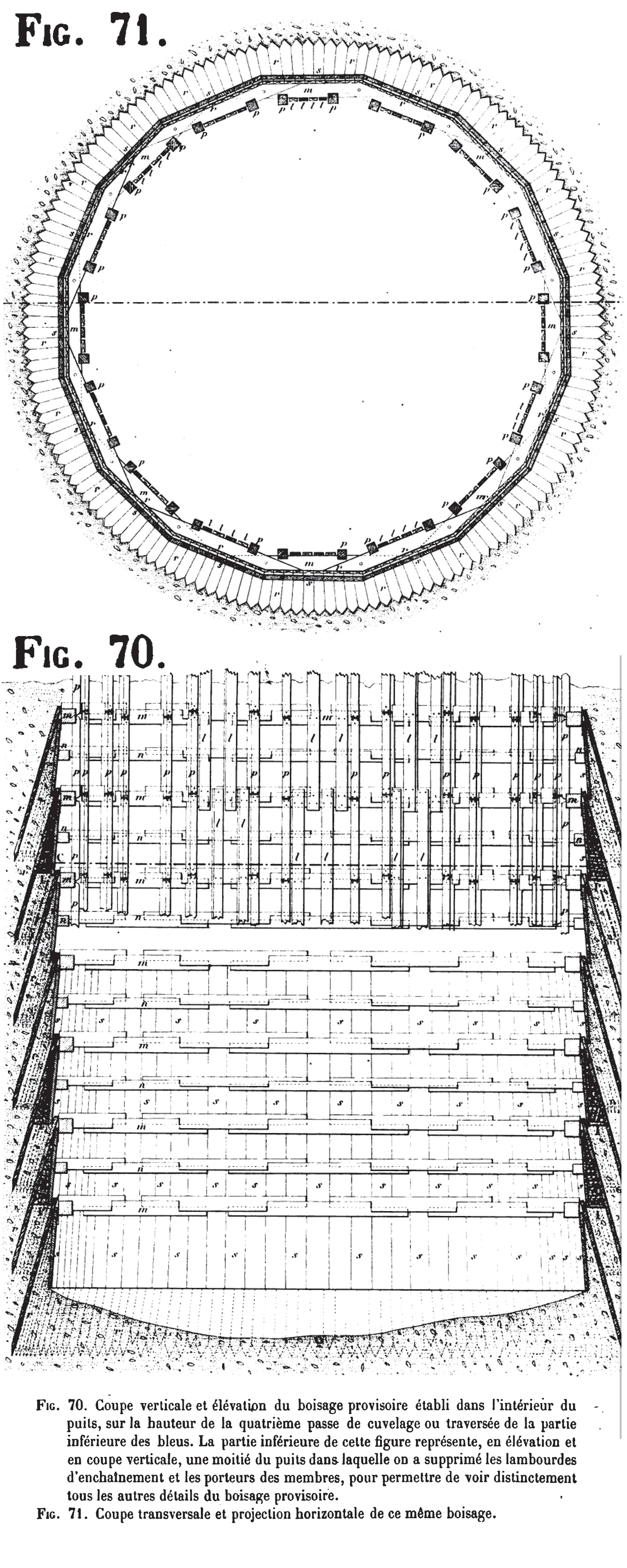
Example of a casing for a well under construction.

=== Tertres shaft ===
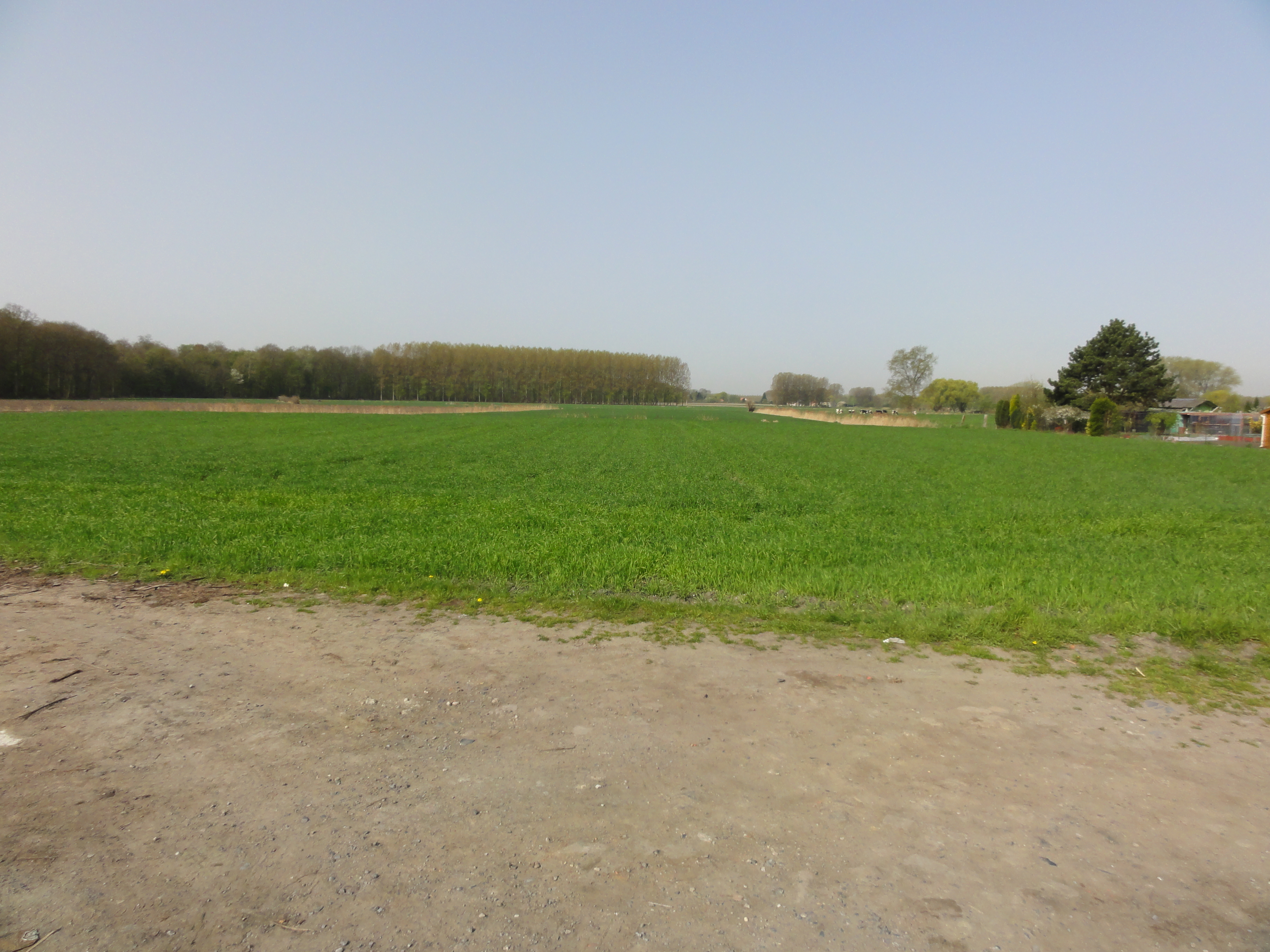
Tertres shaft is located some fifteen metres into the field. There's no sign of her.

50°24′38″N 3°22′42″W

In May of 1838, the Tertres pit was established at the location of the Tertres survey, reaching a depth of 137.60 meters. The work on the shaft was completed on January 8, 1840. Drifts were opened at depths of 110 and 134 meters, extending a considerable distance from the shaft to the north and south. However, these efforts were hindered by the discovery of only three irregular seams (Note: A veinlet is a vein only a few centimetres thick that cannot be mined.) of anthracite coal, which proved to be unprofitable for exploitation. These seams exhibited a general orientation that was approximately east-west, accompanied by a 45° dip towards the south. The work at the Tertres pit was concluded on December 15, 1840, leading to its subsequent abandonment.

=== Prés Barrés shaft ===
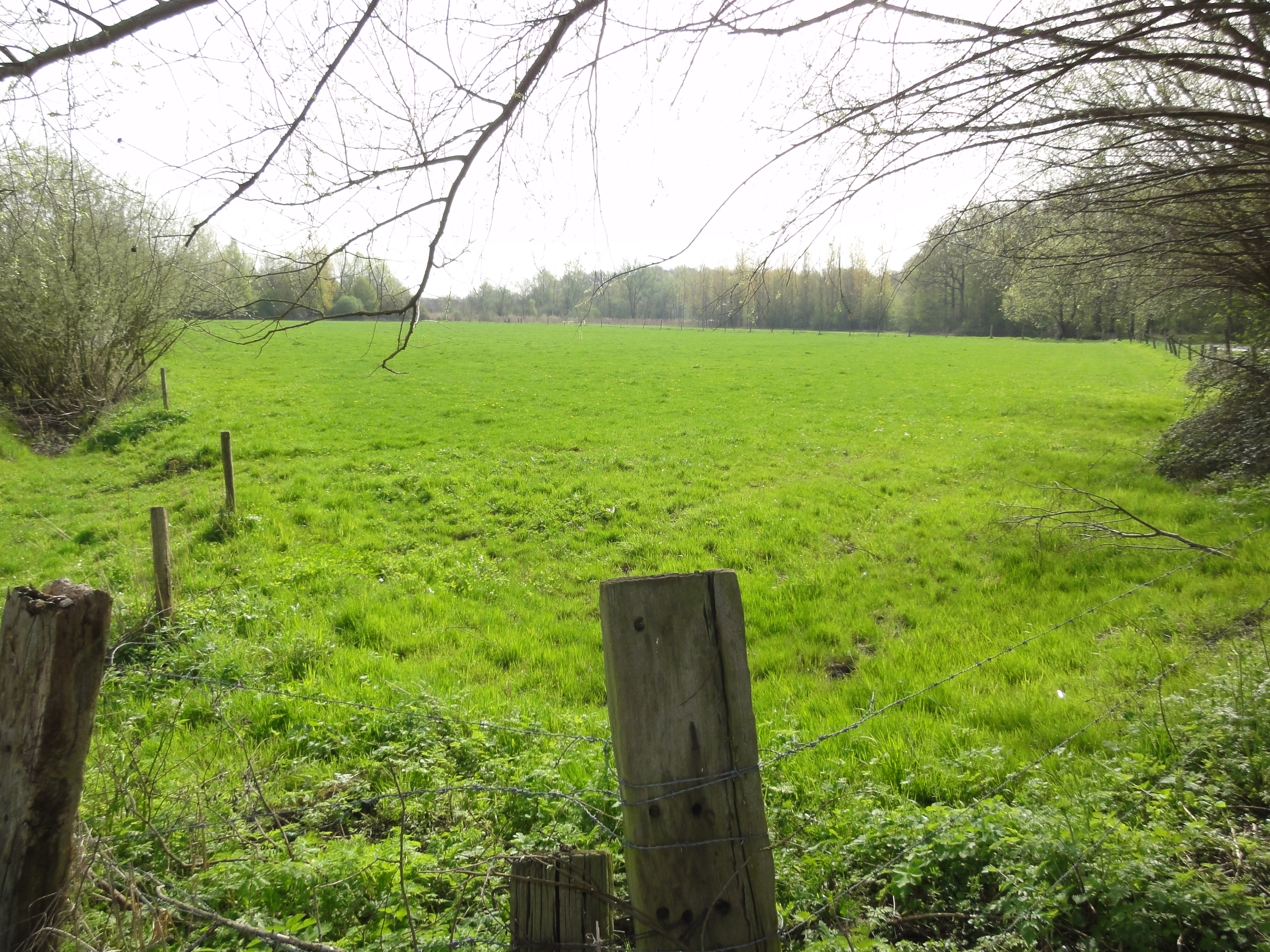
The Prés Barrés shaft is located in this pasture.

50°24′32″N 3°23′06″W

The Prés Barrés shaft was excavated in 1839 in a pasture situated south of Hasnon, in proximity to the Prés Barrés road, at a distance of 500 meters southeast of the Tertres shaft. The coal formation was attained at a depth of 100 meters, and the shaft's depth reached 135 meters. Long drifts were excavated at depths of 112 and 132 meters, but only a few thin coal streaks and a seam of dirty coal were encountered, none of which appeared to be commercially viable. The geology of this pit exhibited significant differences from that of the Tertres pit, leading to uncertainty regarding their geological affiliation, whether as part of a shared coal formation or a distinct geological domain. The pit was abandoned in 1841.

=== Boules or Bouils shaft ===
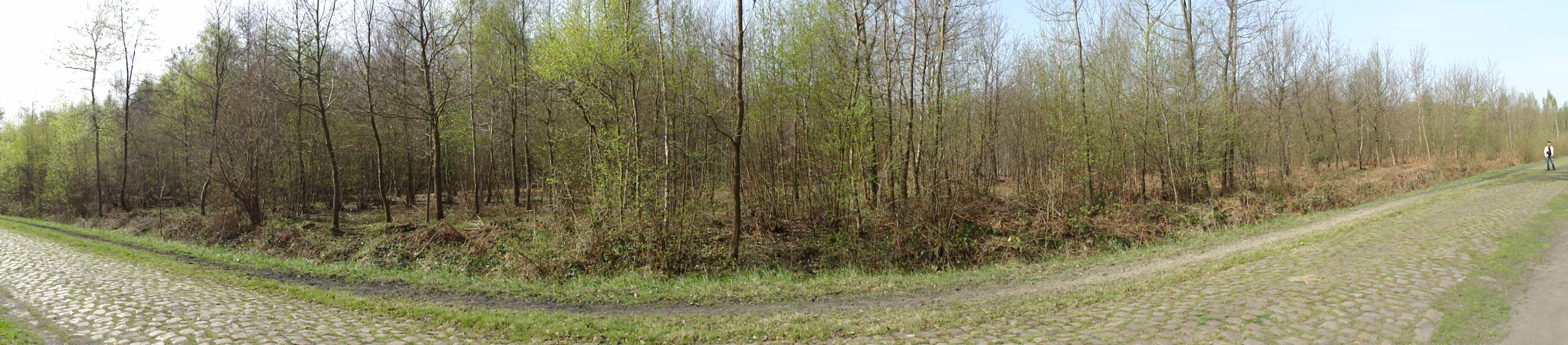
Boules shaft is located about a hundred meters west of the trouée d'Arenberg, in the Raismes-Saint-Amand-Wallers forest. It can only be located using GPS coordinates.

50°24′03″N 3°24′31″W

The Bouils (or Boules) shaft was initiated on May 16, 1840, in Wallers, along the Drève des Boules d'Hérin (known as the Trouée d'Arenberg), in the Raismes-Saint-Amand-Wallers forest. It was located two kilometers northwest of the future Arenberg Pit and approximately 400 meters from the southeastern corner of the concession. The shaft's depth reached 135 meters, with the coal formation encountered at 116 meters. The working level was established at 130.30 meters, and a 100-meter-long drift was driven northward. All work ceased in February 1843, and in March and April 1844, the machinery was dismantled and sent to Denain. After this, from June to July 1844, the facilities were demolished, the shaft was filled in, and the site was cleared. This marked the culmination of the third and final pit of the Hasnon Company.

== Surveys ==
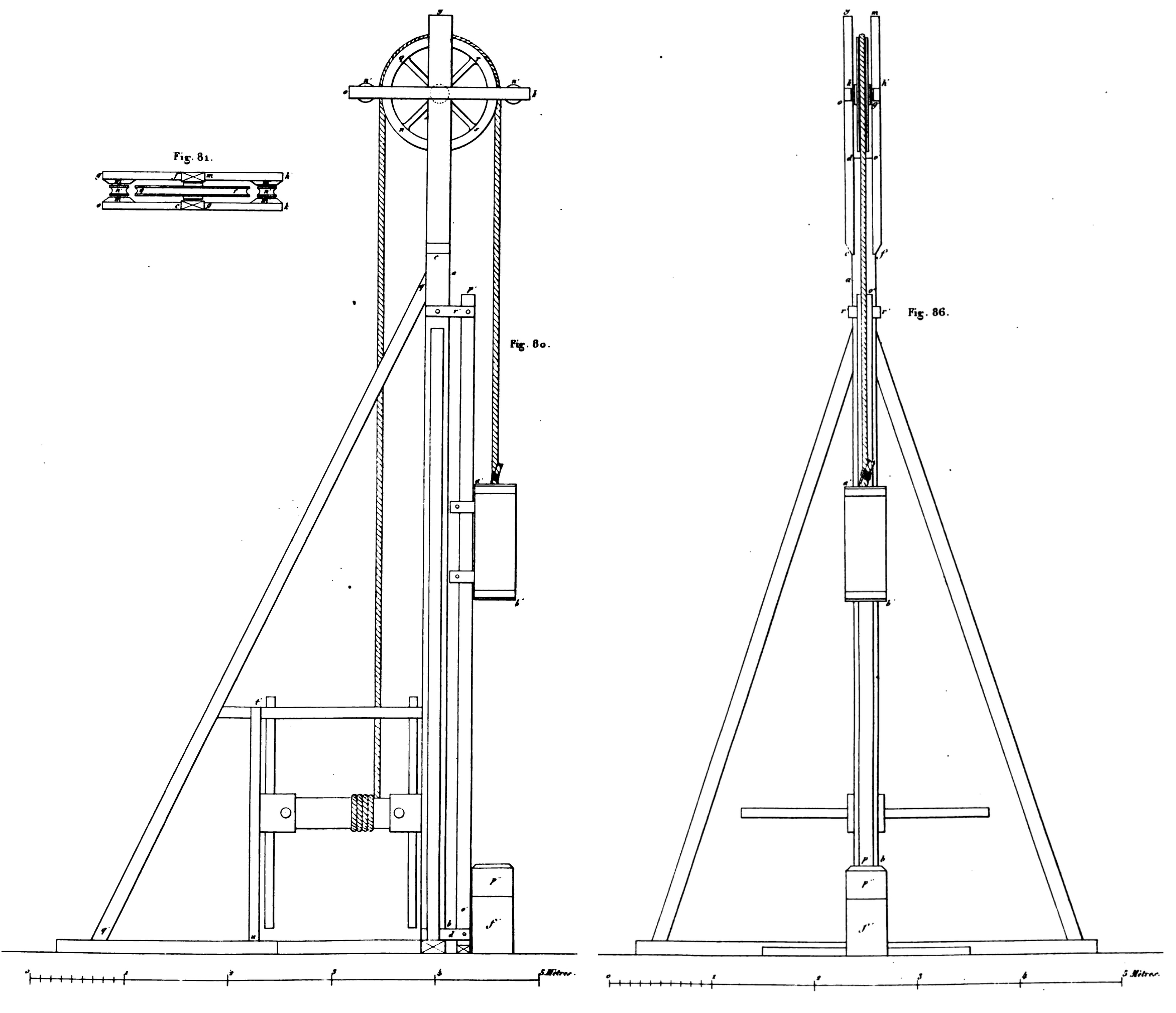
Example of machinery that can be used for surveys.

=== Tertres survey ===
50°24′38″N 3°22′42″W

The Tertres survey, initiated on December 21, 1837, commenced in a pasture situated approximately 1,600 meters southwest of the Hasnon church, at a location now recognized as Rue Édouard Vaillant. The survey ultimately attained a depth of 115.46 meters. On March 11, 1838, the presence of coal was identified at a depth of 103.90 meters, subsequent to the encounter of coal-bearing strata at 102.20 meters. After the discovery of additional layers on May 3, 1838, the survey was terminated on May 6. The Tertres pit was initiated at the survey site during the same month.

=== Fercotte survey ===
50°24′40″N 3°21′00″W

The Fercotte survey, initiated in 1838, was situated in the vicinity of the northwest boundary of the concession, at a distance of 2,700 meters from the Wandignies-Hamage church and five kilometers from the Wallers church in Hasnon. The survey successfully reached the summit of the coal-bearing strata at a depth of 115 meters, subsequently traversing the strata for a distance of fifty meters without encountering coal. Mr. Lorieux's assessment suggested that the drilling had reached the lowest part of the coal formation. The survey was concluded in 1839, having attained a depth of 165.35 meters.

=== Corbets survey ===
50°24′36″N 3°24′22″W

The Corbets survey was initiated in 1838 within the Hasnon concession, at the intersection of Rue des Corbets in Hasnon and the avenue leading from Hasnon to Vicoigne. The coal-bearing strata were encountered at a depth of 95 meters, and the survey was terminated at 153.90 meters. The survey identified three seams of coal with a distinct appearance of being soiled, which were encountered at depths of 124, 125, and 134 meters, respectively.

=== Bruyère survey ===
50°26′18″N 3°24′48″W

The Bruyère survey, initiated on March 27, 1838, in the vicinity of Saint-Amand-les-Eaux, southwest of the town, was conducted by the Hasnon Company. This survey led to the discovery of siliceous limestone at a depth of 85 meters, thereby delineating the northern boundary of the basin between the Bruyère and Mont des Bruyères surveys. The traversal of the strata, extending from ground level to a depth of 85.92 meters, was completed within three weeks. However, the crossing of the final 5.80 meters posed significant challenges due to the extreme hardness of the terrain, necessitating a five-month extension to the survey. The Bruyère survey was officially concluded on September 24, 1838, at a depth of 91.12 meters within siliceous limestone sandstone.

=== First Grand Bray survey ===
50°24′23″N 3°24′22″W

The initial Grand Bray survey commenced on March 10, 1839, in Hasnon, situated within the Hasnon concession, at a point 650 meters north of the Bouils pit. The survey successfully entered the coal-bearing strata at 99 meters and was terminated at 144.50 meters. At a depth of 101 meters, the coal seam was encountered, measuring 80 centimeters in thickness. Two thin seams were identified at 110 and 125 meters, respectively, measuring 23 and 10 centimeters thick. A water gush was observed at a depth of 27 meters. The Grand Bray survey was concluded on August 16, 1839.

=== Bois de Vicoigne survey ===
50°24′18″N 3°25′47″W

The Bois de Vicoigne survey commenced on April 15, 1840, in the Raismes-Saint-Amand-Wallers forest, situated within the geographical boundaries of Raismes. The survey was temporarily suspended for twenty days, from May 7, and subsequently resumed. The coal-bearing strata were encountered at a depth of 117 meters; however, due to the limited extent of drilling, no further results were obtained. (Note: Olry 1886, p. 170) The survey concluded on September 15, 1840, at a depth of 143.35 meters.

=== Second Grand Bray survey ===
50°24′17″N 3°24′26″W

The Bois Wallers survey, also known as the second Grand Bray survey, commenced on October 24, 1842, in the territory of Wallers, situated 500 meters north of the Bouils pit, on the eastern periphery of the Drève des Boules d'Hérin, in proximity to the guard's house. The survey traversed the coal-bearing strata from 101 meters to 130.59 meters, where it was necessary to cease drilling due to a sandstone layer that proved to be too hard to penetrate. The primary objective of the survey was to substantiate the findings of the inaugural Grand Bray survey, which indicated the presence of substantial coal deposits. However, at a depth of 130 meters, the survey encountered a sandstone layer that was so robust that further drilling was impractical. The survey was subsequently abandoned in early April 1843, following a period of over fifteen days of work at the base of the sandstone. Following the abandonment, the survey was inadequately sealed, and it reopened in 1843, initially producing a weak water jet that became powerful in 1844. In early May 1844, the survey was reopened in a single day, extending down to the white marl at a depth of 22.50 meters. After the concretization of the borehole, the survey ceased to release water.

=== Rouges Carrières survey ===
50°23′56″N 3°22′43″W

The Rouges Carrières survey commenced in Wallers at the end of April 1843, situated 130 meters from the southern boundary of the Hasnon concession, in the vicinity of the Tertres pit, along the Denain to Saint-Amand road, at the intersection of the so-called Drèves de la Maison du Garde and Rouges Carrières. The coal-bearing strata were encountered at a depth of 107 meters around July 15, 1843. The survey was temporarily suspended, but it resumed on August 7 of the same year with new equipment and continued uninterruptedly until it reached its maximum depth. At that point, it was abandoned on February 28, 1844. The survey's findings revealed traces of coal at depths of 124, 157, and 167 meters, with a final depth of 171.57 meters. Following the survey's abandonment in 1844, the site was sealed.

=== Drève de Wallers survey ===
50°23′56″N 3°24′13″W

The Drève de Wallers survey was situated within the municipal boundaries of Wallers, along the Drève de Wallers in Hasnon, at a distance of 840 meters from its intersection with the Drève des Boules d'Hérin, and 40 meters from the southernmost boundary of the concession. The survey commenced on March 1, 1844, and by April 27, it had attained the coal-bearing strata at a depth of 117.48 meters. The sole survey conducted within the Hasnon concession did not result in the discovery of a gushing water source. The survey reached a depth of 184.50 meters on November 15, at which point it was formally abandoned.

== See also ==
- Nord-Pas de Calais Mining Basin
- Compagnie des mines d'Anzin

== Bibliography ==
- Vuillemin, Émile (1883). Le Bassin Houiller du Pas-de-Calais. Tome III [The Pas-de-Calais Coal Basin. Volume III] (in French). Imprimerie L. Danel. Archived from the original on December 20, 2021.
- Olry, Albert (1886). Bassin houiller de Valenciennes, partie comprise dans le département du Nord [Valenciennes coalfield, part of the Nord department] (in French). Paris: Imprimerie Quantin.
- Dumont, Gérard (2007). Les 3 âges de la mine [The 3 ages of mining] (in French). Vol. 2. Lille: La Voix du Nord, Lewarde Mining History Centre. ISBN 978-2-84393-107-9.
- Dumont, Gérard; Debrabant, Valérie (2007). Les 3 âges de la mine [The 3 ages of mining] (in French). Vol. 2. Lille: La Voix du Nord, Lewarde Mining History Centre. ISBN 978-2-84393-107-9.
- Collectif (1988). Le Nord, de la Préhistoire à nos jours [The North, from prehistory to the present day] (in French). Saint-Jean-d'Angély: Bordessoules. ISBN 2-903504-28-8.
- Barbier, Frédéric (1989). Le patronat du Nord sous le Second Empire [Northern employers under the Second Empire]. Hautes Études médiévales et modernes (in French). Librairie Droz. ISBN 978-2-600-03408-1.
- Wolff, Jacques (1993). Les Périer : la fortune et les pouvoirs [The Périers: fortune and power] (in French). Economica. ISBN 978-2-7178-2538-1.
