= Villers-Pol =

- Commune
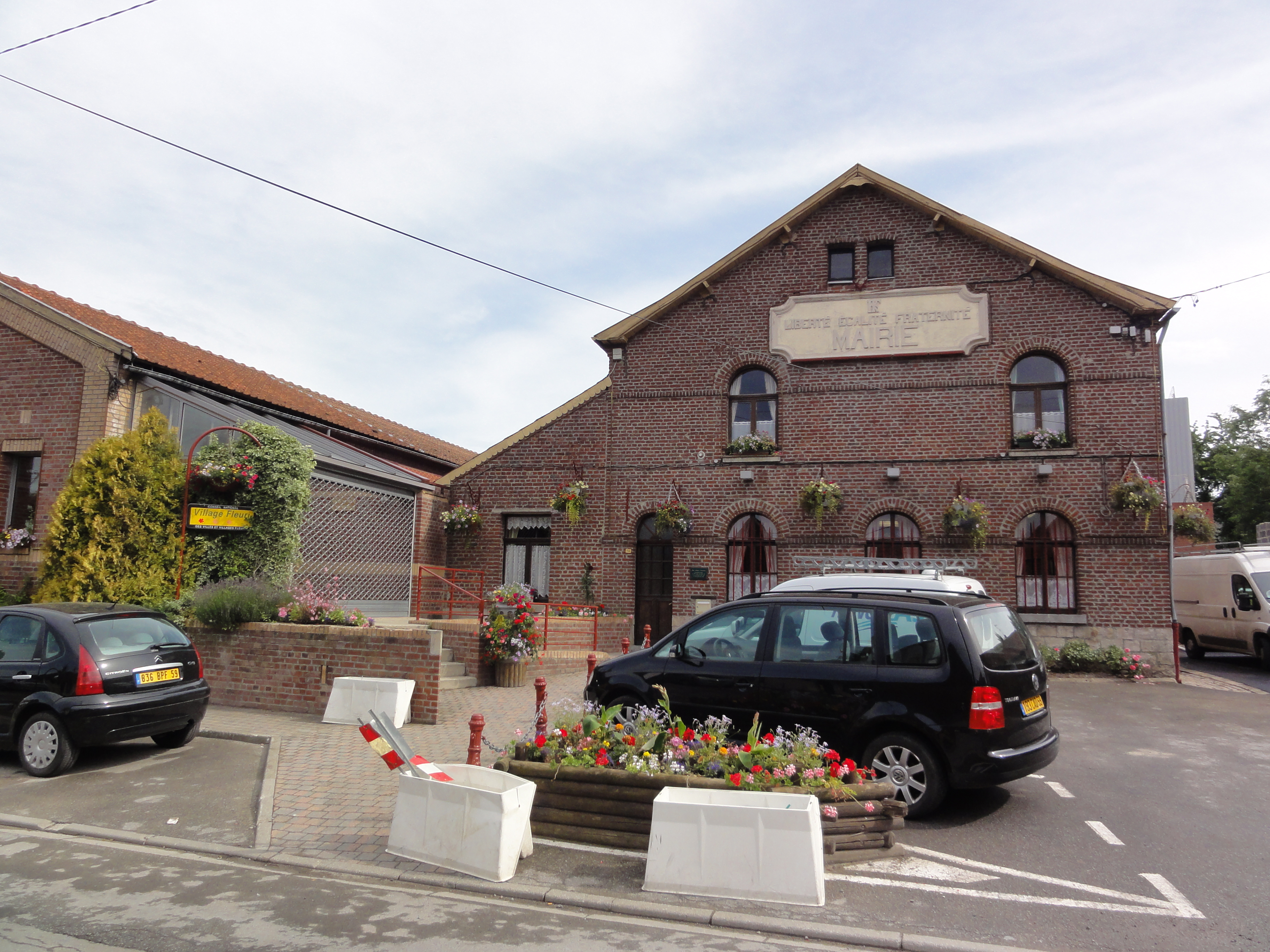
- The town hall in Villers-Pol

- Coat of arms
- Location of Villers-Pol
- Location within France Location within Hauts-de-France
- Coordinates: 50°17′08″N 3°37′01″E
- Country: France
- Region: Hauts-de-France
- Department: Nord
- Arrondissement: Avesnes-sur-Helpe
- Canton: Avesnes-sur-Helpe
- Intercommunality: CC Pays de Mormal

Government
  - Mayor (2020–2026): Olivier Yzanic
- Area^{1}: 12.17 km^{2} (4.70 sq mi)
- Elevation: 111 m (364 ft)
- Highest elevation: 124 m (407 ft)
- Lowest elevation: 62 m (203 ft)
- Population (2023): 1,197
  - Density: 98.36/km^{2} (254.7/sq mi)
- Time zone: UTC+01:00 (CET)
  - Summer (DST): UTC+02:00 (CEST)
- INSEE/Postal code: 59626 /59530
- ^{1} French Land Register data, which excludes lakes, ponds, glaciers > 1 km^{2} (0.386 sq mi or 247 acres) and river estuaries.

Villers-Pol (French pronunciation: [vilɛʁ pɔl]) is a commune in the Nord department in northern France.

== Heraldry ==
| Arms of Villers-Pol | The arms of Villers-Pol are blazoned : Argent, on a bend sable 3 fleurs de lys Or. |

== See also ==
- Communes of the Nord department
