= Siege of Coron =

Siege of Coron can refer to:

- Conquest of Coron (1532) by the Empire of Charles V
- Siege of Coron (1533–1534) by the Ottoman Empire
- Siege of Coron (1685) by the Republic of Venice

== See also ==
- Battle of Coron (1793)
