= Coron D. Evans =

American soldier of the American Civil War

- Born: c. 1844; Jefferson County, Indiana, United States
- Military career
- Allegiance: United States of America
- Branch: United States Army
- Rank: Private
- Units: Company A, 3rd Indiana Volunteer Cavalry Regiment
- Conflicts: Battle of Sayler's Creek
- Awards: Medal of Honor

Private Coron D. Evans (born c. 1844) was an American soldier who fought in the American Civil War. Evans received the United States' highest award for bravery during combat, the Medal of Honor, for his action during the Battle of Sayler's Creek in Virginia on April 6, 1865. He was honored with the award on May 3, 1865.

== Biography ==
Evans was born in Jefferson County, Indiana, in about 1844. He enlisted into the 3rd Indiana Cavalry.

== Medal of Honor citation ==
Capture of flag of 26th Virginia Infantry (Confederate States of America).

== See also ==
- List of American Civil War Medal of Honor recipients: A–F
