= Les Corons =

Single by Pierre Bachelet

from the album Pierre Bachelet
- Released: 1982
- Recorded: 1982
- Genre: Traditional French song
- Length: 4:12
- Label: Polydor
- Songwriters: Jean-Pierre Lang (lyrics); Pierre Bachelet (music)

Music video
- "Les Corons" on YouTube

"Les Corons" is a song by French singer-songwriter Pierre Bachelet and was written by Jean-Pierre Lang and music composed by Bachelet himself. "Les corons" is a regional anthem for the Northern miners of France. The iconic song describes the pride of France's miners, their life and struggle and their feasts, also integrating the music and folklore of the region. The single was released in 1982 on the Polydor record label. It was also included in the self-titled album Pierre Bachelet. A "coron" is a typical miner's habitation from that region.

The supporters of the football club RC Lens use it as a chant. It also became a popular song of the students of École des Mines de Douai.

== Track list ==
- Vinyle 7"
1. "Les Corons" (Pierre Bachelet, Jean-Pierre Lang) – (4:12)
2. "Nos jours heureux" (Pierre Bachelet, Jean-Pierre Lang) – (2:56)

== Versions ==
- In 2010, the Quebec singer Jean-Philippe Bergeron recorded a version of the song in his album Elle est d'ailleurs, produced by Guy St-Onge and consecrated to 12 of Bachelet's best known hits. Pierre Bachelet's wife Fanfan Bachelet, accepted to sponsor the album.
- In 2012, the French vocal quartet Les Stentors interpreted the song.
