= October 2022 European tornado outbreak =

European tornado outbreak in October 2022

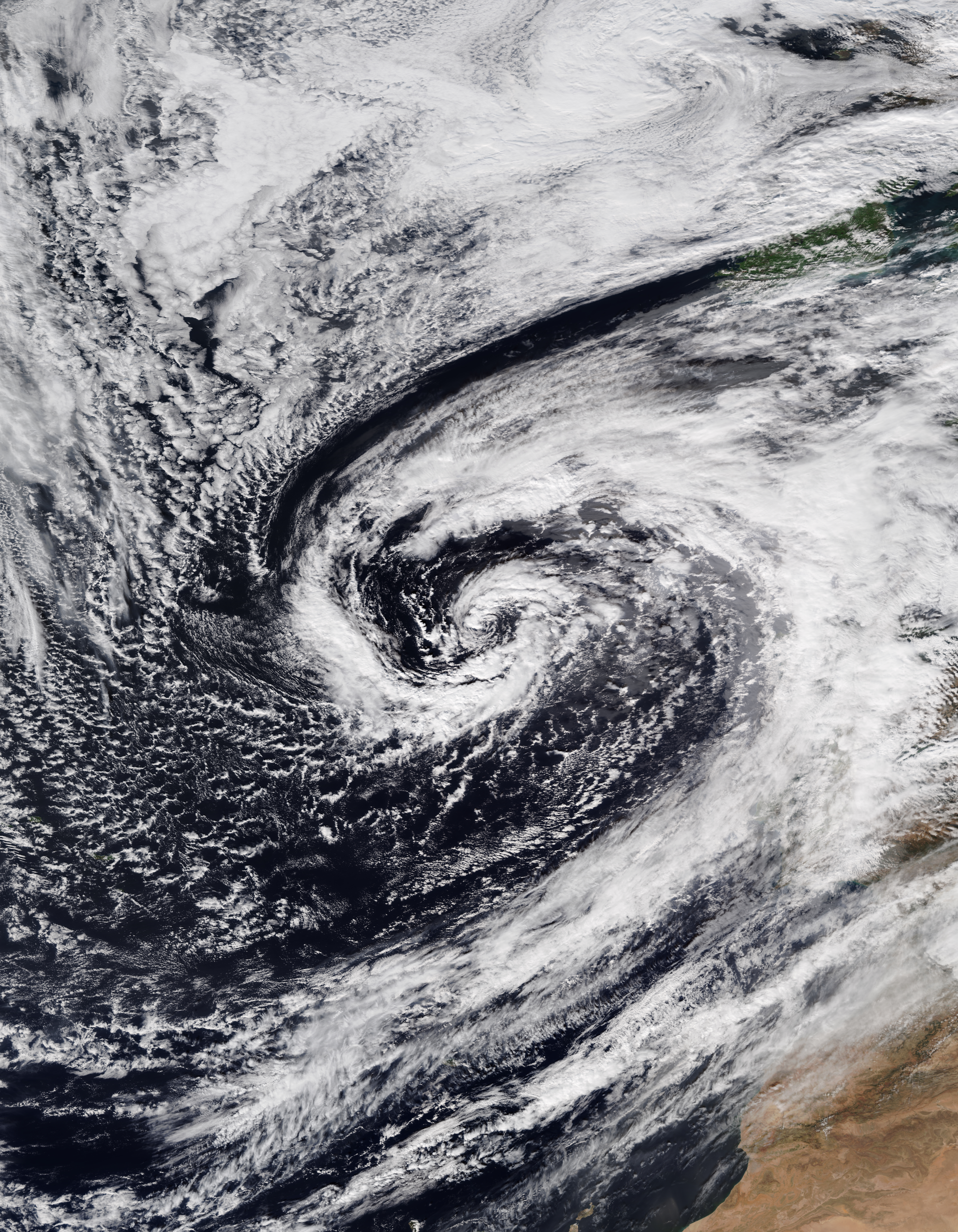
- Storm Beatrice, the storm which was responsible for the tornado outbreak

Meteorological history
- Duration: October 23, 2022

Tornado outbreak
- Tornadoes: 14
- Max. rating: IF3 tornado
- Duration: 5 hours and 55 minutes (approx.)
- Highest winds: 254 km/h (158 mph)–332 km/h (206 mph)
- Largest hail: 7.5 cm (3.0 in) in Upper Normandy

Overall effects
- Fatalities: 0
- Injuries: >1
- Areas affected: Great Britain, France, Low Countries
- Part of the tornado outbreaks of 2022 and 2022–23 European windstorm season

On 23 October 2022, Storm Beatrice spawned multiple severe thunderstorms across parts of Europe, including tornadic supercells in parts of France and embedded circulations in the mesoscale convective system that impacted parts of England. Fourteen tornadoes were confirmed as a result of the outbreak, some of which were strong and caused major damage. The most significant tornadoes of the outbreak occurred in France, including two IF2 tornadoes, and an intense IF3 tornado that caused major damage in multiple towns. The most severe damage from the IF3 tornado occurred in Bihucourt, where numerous brick homes and other buildings had roofs torn off and exterior walls collapsed. The Bihucourt tornado was the strongest tornado in France since an IF3 tornado caused significant damage near Étrochey on 19 June 2013. One of the IF2 tornadoes struck Beuzeville while the other impacted Gaudechart, with significant damage occurring in both towns. In addition to the tornadoes, numerous reports of flooding, hail, and damaging straight-line winds were also received. Despite the severity of the damage, no fatalities occurred as a result of the tornadoes, though a few injuries were reported.

== Meteorological synopsis ==
On 23 October 2022, an unusually favorable late-season severe weather environment developed across northern France, southern England, and the Low Countries, resulting in one of the most significant European tornado outbreaks in recent decades. The event occurred within a strongly forced synoptic regime associated with Storm Béatrice, a deep Atlantic extratropical cyclone that tracked northeastward toward western Europe.

At upper levels, a pronounced longwave trough extended from the North Atlantic into western Europe, with its axis positioned west of France during the morning hours. A powerful southwesterly jet stream, with wind speeds locally exceeding 50–70 m/s at 250–300 hPa, overspread France and the southern North Sea during the afternoon, placing the affected region beneath the left-exit region of the jet streak, which enhanced large-scale ascent. At the surface, Storm Béatrice deepened to approximately 986 hPa near Brittany, drawing a warm and moist air mass northward ahead of an advancing cold front. This resulted in southerly to south-southeasterly low-level flow across northern France and the English Channel, with unseasonably high temperatures reaching 22–24°C in parts of northern France which were values well above climatological norms for late October.

Despite the late-season timing, thermodynamic conditions were sufficient to support deep convection. Model analyses and observations indicated MLCAPE values generally between 500 and 1000 J/kg, locally exceeding 1200 J/kg in northern France, aided by steep mid-level lapse rates associated with cold air aloft and high low-level moisture content. The wind profile was exceptionally favorable for rotating storms. Deep-layer shear (0–6 km) frequently exceeded 25–35 m/s, while low-level shear (0–1 km) reached 15–20 m/s, producing long, curved hodographs. Storm-relative helicity values in the lowest kilometer locally exceeded 200–300 m²/s², supporting the development of supercells capable of producing tornadoes, including strong tornadoes where instability and low-level shear overlapped most effectively.

Thunderstorm initiation began during the late morning hours over western and central France along the advancing cold front and associated convergence zones. By early afternoon, several storms rapidly intensified into discrete supercells, particularly across northern France. These storms tracked northeastward at high forward speeds, sustained by the strong mid-level flow, and produced large hail, damaging winds, and numerous tornadoes, including long-tracked tornadoes that persisted across multiple regions. Farther north, convection evolved into a fast-moving mesoscale convective system, with embedded mesovortices producing additional tornadoes across southern England and later Belgium, even as surface-based instability gradually diminished toward evening.

The European Storm Forecast Experiment (ESTOFEX) issued a Level 2 convective outlook for northwestern France, Belgium, and the Netherlands on 23 October 2022, highlighting the risk of damaging winds and tornadoes, including the potential for strong tornadoes given the extreme low-level shear and sufficient instability. A surrounding Level 1 area extended into southern England and adjacent regions for a lower but non-negligible risk of severe convective weather.

== Confirmed tornadoes ==
IFU	IF0	IF0.5	IF1	IF1.5	IF2	IF2.5	IF3	IF4	IF5	Total
0	0	2	4	4	2	1	1	0	0	14

=== 23 October event ===
List of confirmed tornadoes – Sunday, 23 October 2022 (Note: All dates are based on the local time zone where the tornado touched down; however, all times are in Coordinated Universal Time for consistency.)
IF#	Location	Region	Country	Start coord.	Time (UTC)	Path length	Max. width
IF0.5	Northern Concarneau	Brittany	France	47.867°N 3.917°W	~11:30	0.9 km (0.56 mi)	80 m (87 yd)
IF0.5	A very weak tornado touched down in the northern part of Concarneau in Finistère. It uprooted and snapped numerous small trees, and large limbs of both coniferous and deciduous trees were split or torn. Three telephone poles were sheared through, and two garden shed roofs were torn off, with one of those roofs thrown about 200 m (220 yd) from its original position. The damage was limited and primarily affected vegetation and lightweight structures along the tornado’s short path through the northern outskirts of Concarneau. This tornado was rated EF0 by KERAUNOS.						
IF2.5	SW of Lisieux to Beuzeville area to W of Quillebeuf-sur-Seine	Normandy	France	49.333°N 0.35°E	~14:00	47.6 km (29.6 mi)	500 m (550 yd)
IF2.5	This strong, long-track tornado moved across the Calvados and Eure départements in Normandy, producing damage over a lengthy and continuous path. The tornado first touched down southwest of Lisieux, where minor damage occurred, including broken tree branches, small trees uprooted, garden furniture displaced, roof tiles and slates dislodged, shed roofing torn away, and electrical poles knocked over by falling branches. As it moved northward, this pattern of light but consistent damage continued, with debris and tree fall directions indicating a well-defined damage corridor. From Coquainvilliers northward, the tornado strengthened, causing larger and sometimes centuries-old trees to be uprooted or snapped, orchards heavily damaged, wooden utility poles broken, and roofs increasingly damaged, with occasional brief lulls of its strength. The damage corridor widened with clear convergent damage signatures along the edges. Near Beuzeville, the tornado briefly intensified in strength and reached its peak width. In this area, numerous trees were uprooted or broken, roofs were torn off, and small buildings were damaged or partially collapsed. A residential home suffered major structural failure, with walls collapsing and the roof torn apart above the ceiling, largely due to failure of wooden framing and anchoring. The tornado crossed the A13, scattering branches onto the roadway, then passed through an industrial area where dozens of semi-trailers were tipped over or rolled, and the roof of a vehicle inspection building was partially blown off. Beyond this area, the tornado weakened back, though it remained broad. Along its continued path, a chip shop was lifted, a bungalow was rolled onto its roof, a tractor unit was overturned, and vegetation damage remained widespread. The tornado weakened further, producing tree damage, torn metal sheets, and light structural impacts before dissipating near the A131 close to Quillebeuf-sur-Seine. This tornado was rated EF2 by KERAUNOS.						
IF1	NE of Heudebouville to Muids to SW of Fresne-l'Archevêque	Normandy	France	49.217°N 1.3°E	~14:31	12.8 km (8.0 mi)	100 m (110 yd)
IF1	A tornado began in the Seine river valley initially causing damage by tearing branches from willows and poplars, followed by uprooting small trees and snapping large limbs as the tornado crossed the river and moved into Muids. The tornado briefly strengthened in Muids, where roof tiles were blown off homes and a section of sheet roofing was torn from a school canteen roof and carried about 40 m (44 yd). As it continued northeast, additional tiles were removed from a residence and tree damage persisted while the tornado climbed the northern slope of the Seine Valley, where numerous branches were torn off and some trees were knocked down, aided by steep terrain. The tornado appeared to pass just over La Roquette with little to no visible damage, then crossed open farmland before entering a wooded ravine where larger branches were split or broken. Beyond this area, damage became scattered and non-convergent, and no clear tornado track could be confirmed farther northeast. This tornado was rated EF1 by KERAUNOS.						
IF2	Eastern Barton on Sea to S of Lyndhurst	Hampshire	United Kingdom	50.732°N 1.654°W	~14:35	15 km (9.3 mi)	300 m (330 yd)
IF2	A strong waterspout moved ashore on the east side of Barton on Sea and became a tornado, producing sporadic light damage immediately near landfall, including roof tile damage to a house and a snapped tree. As the tornado moved inland across open ground and woodland, damage became more pronounced, with numerous tree branches snapped, trees twisted, and several trees felled, forming a clear but narrow damage corridor. The tornado intensified as it struck a farm, with a well-defined debris swath crossing fields, containing corrugated metal sheets, asbestos roofing fragments, and other building materials thrown up to 200 m (220 yd). Multiple barns suffered major roof loss, one barn experienced collapse of a brick wall, and another lost most of its roofing, while a telegraph pole was snapped and a brick wall was knocked down. Debris throw directions varied over short distances, indicating complex or multiple vortices, and nearby trees sustained severe snapping, marking the strongest damage along the track. Beyond this area, the tornado caused roof damage to garages and houses, felled or heavily damaged trees, and additional utility damage, though overall intensity fluctuated. Farther inland, greenhouses and polytunnels were severely damaged or destroyed, with glass scattered widely, metal frames twisted, and power lines brought down, including debris that gouged into a metal shed door. As the tornado crossed extensive woodland and heathland, damage became more intermittent but still included felled and topped trees, localized pockets of stronger tree damage, and multidirectional debris patterns suggesting brief embedded vortices. The tornado gradually weakened, producing light, scattered tree damage toward the northern end of its path before dissipating, with no clear structural damage beyond the final wooded areas. This tornado was rated T4 by TORRO.						
IF1.5	N of Fair Oak to E of Colden Common	Hampshire	United Kingdom	50.991°N 1.287°W	~15:05	3.75 km (2.33 mi)	110 m (120 yd)
IF1.5	A tornado began just north of Fair Oak, where only isolated twig and small branch damage was observed. As it moved into Horton Heath and toward nearby woodland, scattered tree damage continued, with snapped branches and minor impacts along a narrow damage path consistent with a weak vortex. South of the B2177, damage became more organized as a strip of maize was flattened while tree crowns were stripped and additional trees were damaged nearby. A large oak tree snapped several meters above the ground, and its fall partially demolished an outbuilding, while roof tiles were torn from a newly built structure and carried northward, indicating strengthening winds and cyclonic debris motion. North of the B2177, damage intensified at several rural properties where large, anchored stable buildings were lifted and thrown, some landing over 100 m (110 yd) away, destroying fencing and structures in their path. Numerous mature trees were felled or badly damaged, though nearby houses and brick buildings were left largely untouched, showing sharp variations in damage intensity across the path. As the tornado continued northward, trees along the track were snapped or uprooted, and video evidence confirmed a condensation funnel on the ground, though structural damage in this section was more limited. At Marwell Zoo, the tornado caused oak trees to fall across a car park, lamp posts to bend, and signposts to snap, with debris thrown northward and at least one vehicle sustaining a shattered windscreen. In Horsham Copse north of the zoo, the tornado produced widespread tree damage along a linear, rotating path, including snapped oak trees up to a meter in diameter. Farther north near Boyes Copse, damage weakened to minor treetop impacts, suggesting the tornado was dissipating near the end of its track. This tornado was rated T2/T3 by TORRO.						
IF0.5	SE of Timsbury to SE of King's Somborne	Hampshire	United Kingdom	51.016°N 1.497°W	~15:14	2 km (1.2 mi)	80 m (87 yd)
IF0.5	This short-lived tornado produced a narrow damage consisting entirely of minor tree damage. Trees were knocked down in varying directions, including some falling northward in a cyclonic pattern while others fell parallel to the track, with branches scattered across the area. No significant structural damage was observed, and the impacts were confined mainly to light vegetation damage before the tornado dissipated. This tornado was rated T4 by TORRO.						
IF2	NE of Morgny to Ferrières-en-Bray to Gaudechart to Conty to Tilloy-lès-Conty area	Hauts-de-France	France	49.6°N 1.95°E	~15:15	45 km (28 mi)	800 m (870 yd)
IF2	This strong, long-track tornado began near Bosquentin, where trees were uprooted, roofs were damaged, and wooden power poles were broken, marking the northwestern edge of the damage path. As the tornado widened and moved toward the Lyons Forest, it snapped and uprooted even sturdy trees, with branch throw increasing across a corridor while peripheral roof damage was noted well outside the core path. The tornado then entered the Seine-Maritime department, tearing metal sheets from farm buildings and causing severe forest damage with trees broken or uprooted, followed by lighter damage on nearby plateaus where shed roofing was removed. Farther north, branches were torn off and roof tiles blown away, during which the tornado briefly weakened. Crossing the D915 and the Epte, the tornado struck Ferrières-en-Bray, where house roofs were partially removed, industrial hangar roofs were torn away, a truck trailer was overturned, and trees were uprooted. The tornado continued northeast across the D930, producing snapped concrete power poles, scattered debris, and roof damage, before entering the Oise department. Across rural areas and woodlands, fields, meadows, and forests sustained widespread damage, with trees uprooted or broken and roofing materials blown off, while peripheral wind damage again affected areas well outside the main corridor. Near Songeons, terrain effects briefly intensified the tornado, causing severe structural damage, downed power infrastructure, roofs torn from homes and businesses, and extensive debris scatter, injuring a child struck by flying debris. The tornado then weakened temporarily before strengthening again as it crossed Gaudechart, where roofs were torn off, garage doors ripped away, trees uprooted, a barn was destroyed, and prefabricated school buildings were blown apart, with strong damage observed in the most affected areas. Beyond Gaudechart, the tornado weakened, though hangar roofs, house roofs, and trees were damaged in nearby communities, forcing closures along the D151 and later the D124 due to fallen trees and power lines. After crossing into the Somme department, the tornado intensified again through Belleuse and Conty, where numerous roofs were damaged or removed, large trees were uprooted, vehicles were displaced, utility poles were bent, and public buildings suffered severe roof loss. In Tilloy-lès-Conty, farm buildings were largely demolished, historic structures lost roofing, perimeter walls collapsed, and large trees snapped, before the tornado finally weakened north of the D210, where it flattened stands of trees over a narrowing corridor.						
IF1.5	NE of Michelmersh to Bransbury to W of Whitchurch	Hampshire	United Kingdom	51.034°N 1.493°W	~15:17	24 km (15 mi)	200 m (220 yd)
IF1.5	This tornado quickly developed, producing a clearly traceable but mostly light damage path. For several kilometers the tornado remained weak, marked by fallen oak branches, snapped limbs, and occasional trees toppled. As the tornado approached the Ashley area, tree damage became more frequent and organized, with multiple mature trees felled and branches thrown eastward, though the path remained relatively narrow. Near Up Somborne, the tornado strengthened sharply, destroying beehives, glasshouses, and a well-anchored polytunnel, while large tree tops were snapped and lofted tens of meters, debris was driven into the ground, and orchards suffered catastrophic losses. Nearby farms experienced extensive tree loss, buckled barn doors, minor roof damage, and snapped telegraph poles, cutting phone and internet service, with debris thrown well off the main axis. North of this area, damage gradually weakened, though a continuous trail of felled and damaged trees remained visible across farmland. Beyond the A30, the tornado narrowed again, producing light hedge and tree damage in exposed countryside. Farther north through Bransbury and Longparish, damage documented included felled trees, roof tile loss, and shed roof damage, with a more concentrated corridor of damage within a broader area of storm impacts. Near Hurstbourne Priors, the tornado produced significant damage, including snapped and felled trees, before weakening again. Along the B3048, a clearer damage swath showed trees snapped at height and falling northward. The tornado ended near St Mary’s Hill, where only minor roof tile loss and small branch damage were found, marking dissipation of the circulation. This tornado was rated T3 by TORRO.						
IF1	W of Querrieu to NE of Behencourt	Hauts-de-France	France	49.95°N 2.433°E	~15:55	11 km (6.8 mi)	100 m (110 yd)
IF1	A tornado moved through the Querrieu area, crossing the Amiens Golf Club, where it uprooted or snapped numerous trees, including birch, ash, willow, and oak, with damage patterns showing clear convergent and asymmetric debris fall typical of a fast-moving vortex. The core circulation passed across the golf course access area, parking lot, and nearby fairways and shifted slightly eastward. Tree damage remained continuous along the D929 and into the Querrieu Forest, then intensified again in the Corneillers Valley, where tall trees were snapped at the northwestern edge of the path and trees along the southeastern side were blown down toward the north or north-northeast, confirming strong rotational winds. Farther east, additional vegetation damage occurred in nearby communities as outflow winds spread away from the main circulation. In Fréchencourt, particularly in low-lying marsh areas, poplar trees were severed near the base, while trees on slightly higher ground suffered broken branches or partial uprooting, indicating weaker winds outside the core. Near Béhencourt, the tornado weakened with damage limited almost entirely to trees and branches. Rows of trees were lightly damaged and branches were torn off in rural areas before the tornado dissipated.						
IF3	N of Mesnil-Martinsart to Bihucourt to Hendecourt-lès-Cagnicourt	Hauts-de-France	France	50.126°N 2.801°E	14:48 - 17:20	206 km (128 mi)	1 km (1,100 yd)
IF3	See section on this tornado						
IF1	Eastern Welling	Greater London	United Kingdom	51.452°N 0.116°E	~16:25	2 km (1.2 mi)	300 m (330 yd)
IF1	This tornado tracked through the Welling area, producing a narrow damage path. Along its path, trees were snapped or uprooted, roofs of homes and outbuildings were damaged, and lightweight objects such as refuse bins were overturned. Damage became more sporadic toward the northern end of the track before the tornado dissipated.						
IF1.5	N of Écourt-Saint-Quentin to Arleux to Northern Erchin to Masny NE of Écaillon	Hauts-de-France	France	50.283°N 3.1°E	~16:50	11 km (6.8 mi)	500 m (550 yd)
IF1.5	A tornado began near Écourt-Saint-Quentin, initially causing minor vegetation damage and slight roof damage to a few houses with clear convergent tree fall patterns as it crossed the Sensée marshes, where willows and poplars were uprooted. Entering the Nord department, the tornado intensified while moving into Arleux, uprooting trees, damaging roofs. The most severe damage in Arleux occurred near the SNCF railway line between Douai and Cambrai, where fallen branches halted a train, and in a nearby housing estate where sections of roofs were blown off, garage roofs and doors were torn away, debris shattered vehicle glass, and a parked car was pushed several meters. Continuing northeast toward the D643, the tornado crossed wooded areas with a broad damage corridor and was filmed as a rain-wrapped circulation, blowing down signage and producing dangerous airborne debris. In Erchin, damage concentrated in the northern part of town, where roofs were partially removed, fences torn down, trees uprooted, and power poles knocked over, causing outages, with roof damage observed well outside the core path. The tornado then struck Masny, heavily impacting the Champ Fleuri housing estate, where flat-roofed homes lost large roof sections, garage roofs and doors were torn away, and numerous public buildings sustained damage. After crossing the D645, the tornado weakened gradually through Écaillon and toward Rieulay, producing weak damage including partial roof loss, uprooted trees, broken large branches, displaced garden furniture, and damage to a horticultural business. The tornado continued to weaken with fallen trees generally oriented toward the north or northeast becoming less common. The tornado affected areas on both sides of the D13 before finally lifting, ending its path with mainly vegetation damage.						
IF1.5	S of Mortagne-du-Nord, FR to Southern Leuze-en-Hainaut, BE	Hauts-de-France (FR), Hainaut (BE)	France, Belgium	50.467°N 3.45°E	~17:05	15 km (9.3 mi)	800 m (870 yd)
IF1.5	This tornado began near Mortagne-du-Nord, where trees were damaged near the confluence of the Scarpe and Scheldt rivers, then widened significantly as it moved toward Flines-lès-Mortagne, producing broken willow and poplar branches and other light vegetation damage across a broad corridor dominated by strong winds. Continuing toward Legies and Rouillon, trees were uprooted, minor damage occurred to houses, and power lines were torn down, briefly disrupting traffic, while eyewitnesses reported "violent" wind shaking vehicles and toppling large garden trees. The tornado entered Belgium near Callenelle, where damage intensified with trees uprooted or snapped, including rows of poplars broken at mid-height or near the base, and similar impacts near a railway line, a castle park, and agricultural land. Moving into Brasmenil, the tornado reached its peak width, causing widespread tree damage, roof loss on houses and farm sheds, and consistent debris fall toward the north or northeast. As it crossed the E42, tree branches were torn off, then in Braffe the tornado uprooted centuries-old trees, tore roofs from agricultural buildings, damaged a chapel by removing its cross, and caused roof damage to homes, with debris thrown considerable distances. Farther east along the N50, houses were damaged, trees uprooted, and electrical wires detached, before the tornado struck Willaupuis, where a very wide corridor of damage included severely damaged roofs, felled trees, and strong suction effects, even tearing structural elements from a village hall while nearby buildings were only lightly affected. Entering Vieux-Leuze, damage became more scattered and weakened, consisting mainly of stripped tree branches and isolated uprooted trees, before the circulation lost its organized, convergent damage pattern and dissipated.						
IF1	N of Ath to ESE of Lessines	Hainaut	Belgium	50.65°N 3.783°E	~17:25	10 km (6.2 mi)	200 m (220 yd)
IF1	This tornado touched down in Rebaix, producing localized but concentrated damage that included large tree branches broken or torn off, some of which fell onto vehicles, along with minor structural impacts. As the tornado continued northeastward beyond Rebaix, intermittent vegetation damage was observed across the countryside, with trees and large limbs broken or uprooted along a narrow and discontinuous path. The circulation persisted into Bois de Lessines, where additional tree damage was documented before it weakened and lifted.						

=== Bihucourt, France ===
Bihucourt tornado
IF3 tornado
- on the International Fujita scale
- Highest winds: 220 km/h (140 mph)–240 km/h (150 mph)

Overall effects
- Fatalities: 0
- Injuries: 1

This intense tornado touched down and moved northeast as it produced intermittent but clearly convergent vegetation damage across farmland, with shrubs flattened and tree branches snapped along a broad corridor. Entering the Ancre river valley, the vortex interacted with the low-lying terrain, causing scattered tree damage along the river, railway corridor, and adjacent meadows, with branches torn from poplars, willows, and conifers and occasional trees leaning or uprooted. After an abrupt northward turn, the tornado strengthened while crossing wooded areas and agricultural land, snapping poplars, flattening shrubs, and scattering debris, including tarpaulins and metal sheets, before entering Pas-de-Calais.

The tornado then intensified dramatically as it struck Bihucourt, engulfing much of the village within a narrow but violent core. Roofs were torn off homes, exterior and gable walls collapsed, sheds were twisted or destroyed, vehicles were displaced or overturned, concrete utility poles were bent or snapped, and heavy debris such as gates, roofs, and metal sheeting was hurled hundreds of meters. Nearly half of the affected homes were left uninhabitable, and fields surrounding the village were stripped of leaves and vegetation, indicating extreme suction. After leaving Bihucourt, the tornado maintained severe intensity through nearby woodlands and farmland, devastating forests, scattering debris over several kilometers, damaging large trees, and stripping crops before gradually weakening.

Crossing additional agricultural areas, the tornado damaged large farm buildings, twisted metal structures, uprooted trees, and caused vehicle accidents on the A1 motorway as intense winds impacted traffic. It later weakened while continuing eastward, producing roof damage, broken trees, and scattered debris in several communities. Near the end of its path, the tornado caused localized structural damage, uprooted trees, and power outages before finally dissipating after a long and destructive track.

== Impact and aftermath ==
=== France ===
In northern France, emergency services were deployed across multiple departments following reports of tornadoes, destructive winds, and intense rainfall. Rail traffic was disrupted on several regional lines after debris and fallen trees obstructed tracks, while road closures were implemented due to unsafe conditions and downed power lines. Thousands of households experienced power outages, particularly in the Hauts-de-France region, as electrical infrastructure was damaged by wind and falling debris. Local authorities activated emergency shelters in several communes to accommodate displaced residents, and damage assessments were initiated by civil protection agencies in coordination with insurance providers.

=== Belgium ===
In Belgium, the storm system prompted emergency responses across parts of Hainaut Province, where municipalities reported widespread utility interruptions and hazardous travel conditions. Several local roads were temporarily closed, and rail traffic experienced delays due to fallen trees and debris near tracks. Local authorities coordinated debris removal and infrastructure inspections, while fire brigades and civil protection units responded to hundreds of emergency calls related to storm damage. Public events were canceled in affected municipalities as a precaution during cleanup operations.

=== United Kingdom ===
In the United Kingdom, severe thunderstorms associated with the outbreak caused travel disruption across parts of southern England, including Greater London and the South East. Network Rail reported delays and temporary suspensions on several routes after fallen trees and debris obstructed rail lines, while road closures were enacted by local councils due to hazardous conditions. Power outages affected thousands of customers, and emergency crews were dispatched to respond to reports of structural damage, fallen trees, and blocked roads. The Met Office issued multiple weather warnings during and after the event, advising the public to avoid non-essential travel while cleanup operations were underway.

== See also ==
- Tornadoes of 2022
- List of European tornadoes and tornado outbreaks
  - August 2008 European tornado outbreak – Another European tornado outbreak that occurred in a similar region.
