= Siege of Lille (1792) =

Battle of the War of the First Coalition

Coordinates: 50°37′40″N 3°3′30″E

- Part of the War of the First Coalition
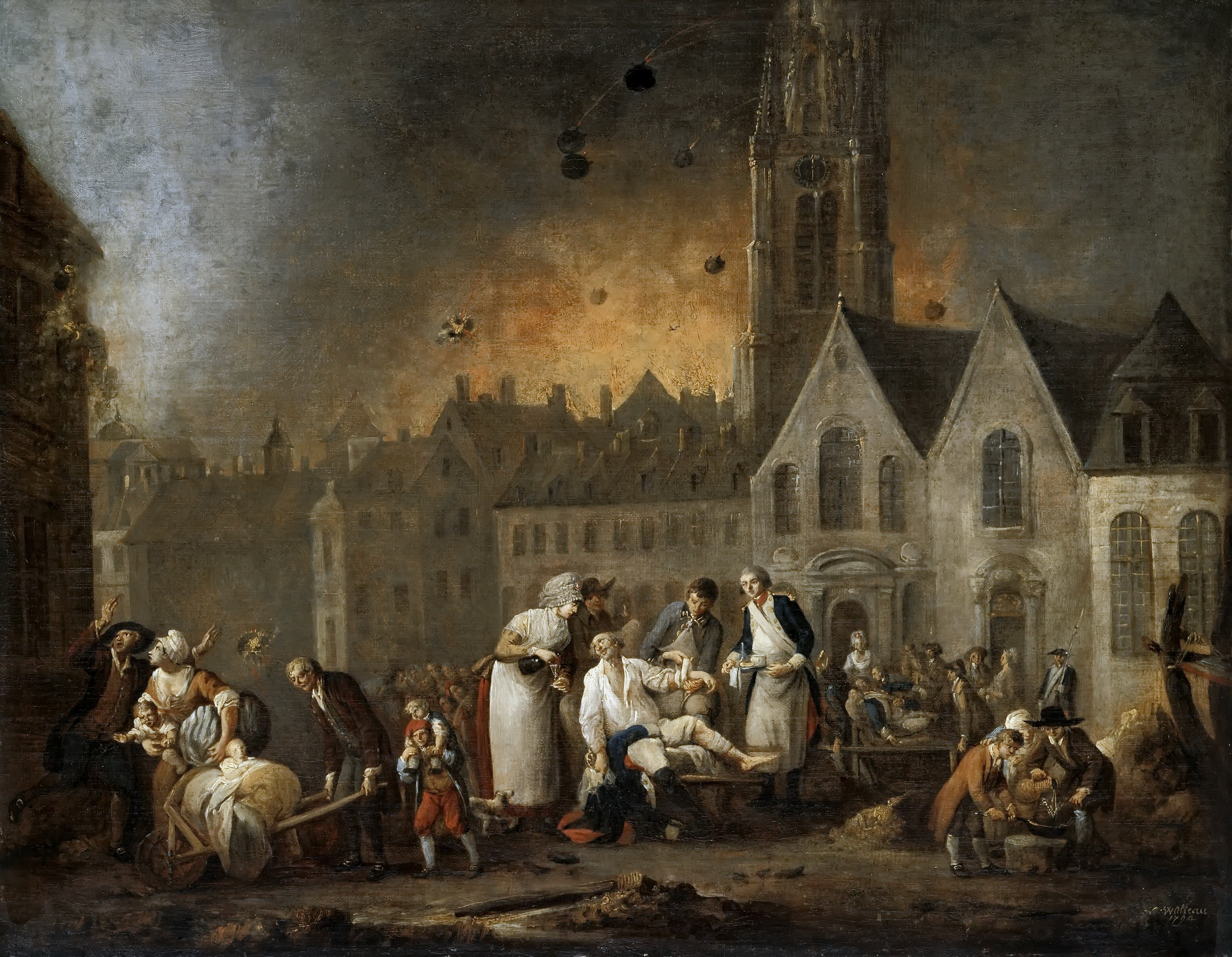
- The Austrian bombardement of Lille in October 1792. Painting by Louis Joseph Watteau.
Date	25 September – 8 October 1792
Location	Lille, Nord, France
Result	French victory

Belligerents
(French First Republic) Republican France; Belgian exiles	Habsburg monarchy

Commanders and leaders
(French First Republic) Jean-Baptiste Ruault	(Habsburg monarchy) Albert of Teschen

Strength
10,000–25,000	13,800, 52 siege guns

Casualties and losses
100–200	43 dead, 161 wounded 20 siege guns

The siege of Lille (25 September – 8 October 1792) saw a Republican French garrison under Jean-Baptiste André Ruault de La Bonnerie hold Lille against an assault by a Habsburg army commanded by Duke Albert of Saxe-Teschen. Though the city was fiercely bombarded, the French successfully withstood the Austrian attack in the action. Because the Austrians were unable to completely encircle the city, the French were able to continuously send in reinforcements. After news of the French victory over the Prussians at Valmy, Albert withdrew his troops and siege cannons. The next battle was at Jemappes in November. The Column of the Goddess monument was completed in 1845 to commemorate the siege.

== Historic defenses ==
After the Kingdom of France captured Lille in 1668, the famous military engineer Sébastien Le Prestre de Vauban was ordered to improve its defenses. The five-sided citadel was constructed between 1668 and 1672 at a cost of 1,500,000 florins and the result was announced by Vauban to be the "Queen of Citadels". The citadel was surrounded by marshes, except where it adjoined the city, and was protected by two flooded ditches and two covered ways. In 1670, parts of the old walls were torn down to make room for new fortifications. When the work was done, Lille was protected by 16 bastions and four hornworks. Vauban estimated that 12,000 soldiers were required to defend the huge fortifications, including 1,000 manning the citadel. The four-month 1708 siege of Lille ended in the city's surrender to Prince Eugene of Savoy and John Churchill, 1st Duke of Marlborough when the garrison of Louis François, duc de Boufflers ran out of gunpowder.

== Background ==
On 19 August, Gilbert du Motier, Marquis de La Fayette left his command at the Army of the North and entered Coalition territory with 22 members of his staff. On 17 August, the increasingly radicalized French Legislative Assembly had demanded that La Fayette report to Paris for questioning and on the 19th he was charged with treason. Not understanding that his domestic enemies wanted to guillotine him, the Prussians and Austrians imprisoned La Fayette until 1797. His replacement in army command was the more astute Charles François Dumouriez. Dumouriez dreamed of an immediate invasion of the Austrian Netherlands, but events soon forced him to hold off on that plan. On 24 August, the politically-connected François Joseph Westermann arrived at headquarters with the news that Longwy had fallen to the Coalition the day before after a feeble defense. After calling Anne François Augustin de La Bourdonnaye from the command of Lille to lead the northern wing of the Army of the North, Dumouriez headed south with Westermann and his aide-de-camp Jacques MacDonald.

Charles William Ferdinand, Duke of Brunswick-Wolfenbüttel at the head of 42,000 Prussians was supported on his right by François Sébastien Charles Joseph de Croix, Count of Clerfayt with 15,000 Austrians and on his left by Friedrich Wilhelm, Fürst zu Hohenlohe-Kirchberg with 14,000 Austrians. The Coalition forces bombarded Longwy into submission then gained a quick triumph in the Battle of Verdun on 2 September. At last Dumouriez realized that Brunswick might be headed to Paris and marched his available troops to Grandpré in the Prussian's path. He also ordered Pierre de Ruel, marquis de Beurnonville to join him with 10,000 soldiers from the Army of the North and Blaise Duval to bring 3,050 more. The Battle of Valmy occurred on 20 September, after which Brunswick withdrew from France.

With Dumouriez absent, the French only had 6,000 troops under René Joseph Lanoue to defend Maubeuge. There were 4,000 soldiers led by Jacques Henri Moreton Chabrillant spread between Bruille-Saint-Amand, Saint-Amand-les-Eaux and Orchies as well as 4,000–5,000 men in the Camp of Maulde. Duke Albert of Saxe-Teschen decided to divert French strength away from Brunswick's invasion by launching attacks on the enemies before him. Saxe-Teschen counted 51 infantry battalions and 40 cavalry squadrons of which 14 battalions were in garrisons. On 3 September Anton Sztáray threatened Philippeville while Johann Peter Beaulieu menaced Quiévrain. When Maximilian Anton Karl, Count Baillet de Latour advanced from Tournai toward Lille on 5 September, Moreton abandoned the Camp of Maulde and fell back behind the Scarpe River. Latour pursued and pounced on the French at Mortagne-du-Nord, routing them. The defeated soldiers tried to lynch Moreton but he managed to talk them out of it. Moreton later complained that many of his troops were uncontrollable and became drunk or looted houses in Saint-Amand. Radical journalist Louis-Marie Prudhomme accused Moreton of either incompetence or treason.

== Siege ==
Seeing the panic that his attacks had caused, Saxe-Teschen decided to besiege Lille. On 16 September, he added troops from Beaulieu's division at Mons to Latour's division from Tournai, bringing up the total to approximately 15,000 men and 50 guns. Saxe-Teschen set out from Tournai to join the besiegers on 25 September. Lille was one of the most powerful of the barrier fortresses, with a well-supplied garrison of 3,000 regular infantry under Jean-Baptiste André Ruault de La Bonnerie. The defenders were quickly reinforced to a strength of 10,000 men. The Austrian effort was handicapped by the fact that their siege train was too small and their army was too weak to entirely surround Lille. Consequently, the French were able to bring in reinforcements without hindrance.

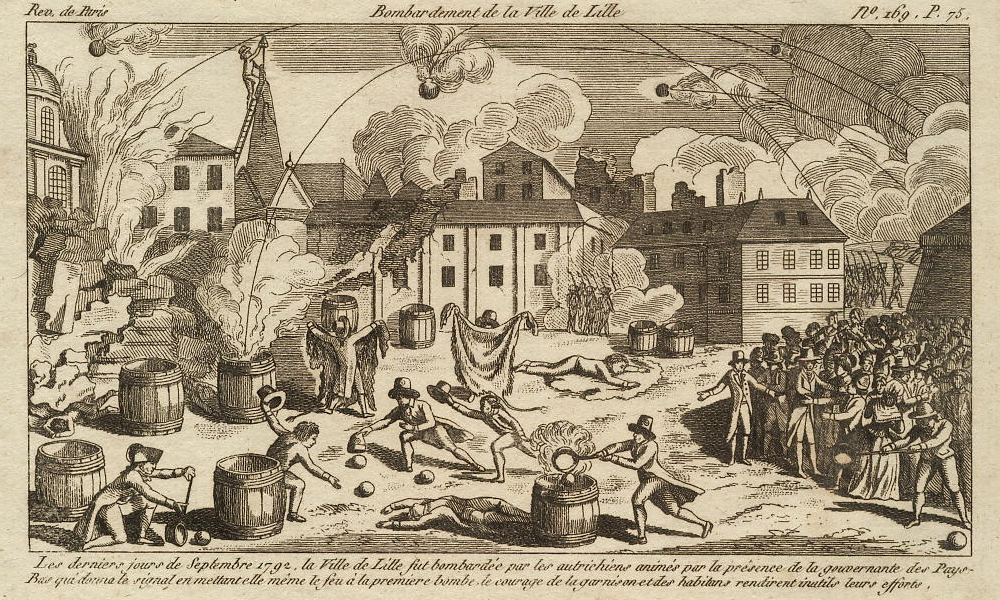
The citizen bucket brigades during the bombardment.

On 24 September, the Austrians pushed back the French outposts and commenced digging trenches that night. The first parallel was laid out across the main highway to Tournai and five batteries with a total of 30 artillery pieces were spaced 200 paces apart. After rejecting Saxe-Teschen's summons to surrender, the energetic Ruault mounted sorties every night but was unable to halt progress on the siege works. On 29 September, the Austrian batteries opened a devastating bombardment upon the buildings of Lille with shot, shell and hot-shot. Fires were set in the city but citizen bucket brigades kept the damage in check. The cannons of the defenders returned a heavy volume of fire.

Ruault was soon reinforced to 25,000 men, a force considerably outnumbering the besiegers. By 3 October the Austrian bombardment began to noticeably taper off. On 3 October, the citizen captain Charlemagne Ovigneur continued to serve his gun even though he knew his house was burning and his wife was going to give birth. On 4 October, Saxe-Teschen's wife, Maria Christina, Duchess of Teschen appeared in the Austrian camp and the bombardment was redoubled. By this time, Saxe-Teschen became aware of Brunswick's retreat as well as the increasing numbers of French troops opposing him. On 6 October the Habsburg commander directed that the heavy siege guns be removed from the batteries. By this time 60,000 shot and shell had been fired into Lille. The Austrians evacuated the trenches on 8 October and withdrew almost unmolested in the face of a weak pursuit led by Félix Marie Pierre Chesnon de Champmorin. The inhabitants of Lille emerged from their town and, in their rage at the destruction, leveled the Austrian siege works. The victory was celebrated throughout France and caused many men to enlist in the armies.

== Forces ==
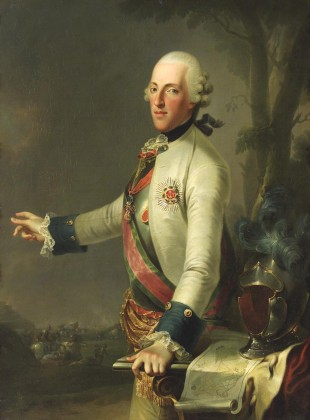
Duke of Saxe-Teschen

Ruault's 10,000-man garrison consisted of two battalions of the 85th Line Infantry Regiment, one battalion each of the 15th, 86th and 100th Line, the depots of battalions of the 24th, 44th, 56th and 90th Line, one National Guard battalion and the depots of three National Guard battalions and depot squadrons of the 3rd and 6th Cavalry Regiments. Other reinforcements came into the city during the siege. Since the summer of 1792, Charles François Duhoux was the commander of Lille but he was ordered to take charge of the Camp of Soissons, just before the start of the siege. Even so, he returned to Lille on 23 September to assume command but a few days later he was suspended and ordered to report to Paris. Instead, he remained in Lille during the siege, not arriving in Paris until 10 October. He was attacked in newspaper articles but defended himself by arguing that leaving Lille during the siege would have been cowardly.

The Austrians besieged Lille with 13,800 troops in 10 1/2 battalions, six companies and 18 squadrons. The siege train included 52 cannons, howitzers and mortars. Saxe-Teschen organized his army into three divisions under Latour, Duke Ferdinand Frederick Augustus of Württemberg and Beaulieu, each with one brigade. Latour's division had the brigade of Franz Xaver von Wenckheim, which included the Leeuven and Rousseau Grenadier Battalions and two battalions of Sztáray Nr. 33 Infantry Regiment. Württemberg's division controlled Sztáray's brigade which was composed of the 1st Battalion of the Clerfayt Nr. 9 and 2nd Battalion of the Alton Nr. 15 Infantry Regiments and the Pückler Grenadier Battalion. Beaulieu's division directed the brigade of Karl von Biela which had the 1st Battalions of the Ligne Nr. 30 and Murray Nr. 55 Infantry Regiments, the 2nd Battalion of the Josef Colloredo Nr. 57 Infantry Regiment and four companies of the O'Donell Freikorps. Louis-François, Count of Civalart d'Happoncourt led a cavalry brigade with two squadrons of the Blankenstein Hussars Nr. 16 and seven squadrons of the Latour Chevau-légers Nr. 31. Charles Eugene, Prince of Lambesc led a second cavalry brigade which included two squadrons of the Wurmser Hussars Nr. 30 and six squadrons of Degelmann Freikorps Uhlans. Karl Friedrich von Lindenau commanded one company each of sappers and pontonniers. One squadron and one-half battalion are not accounted for in the list.

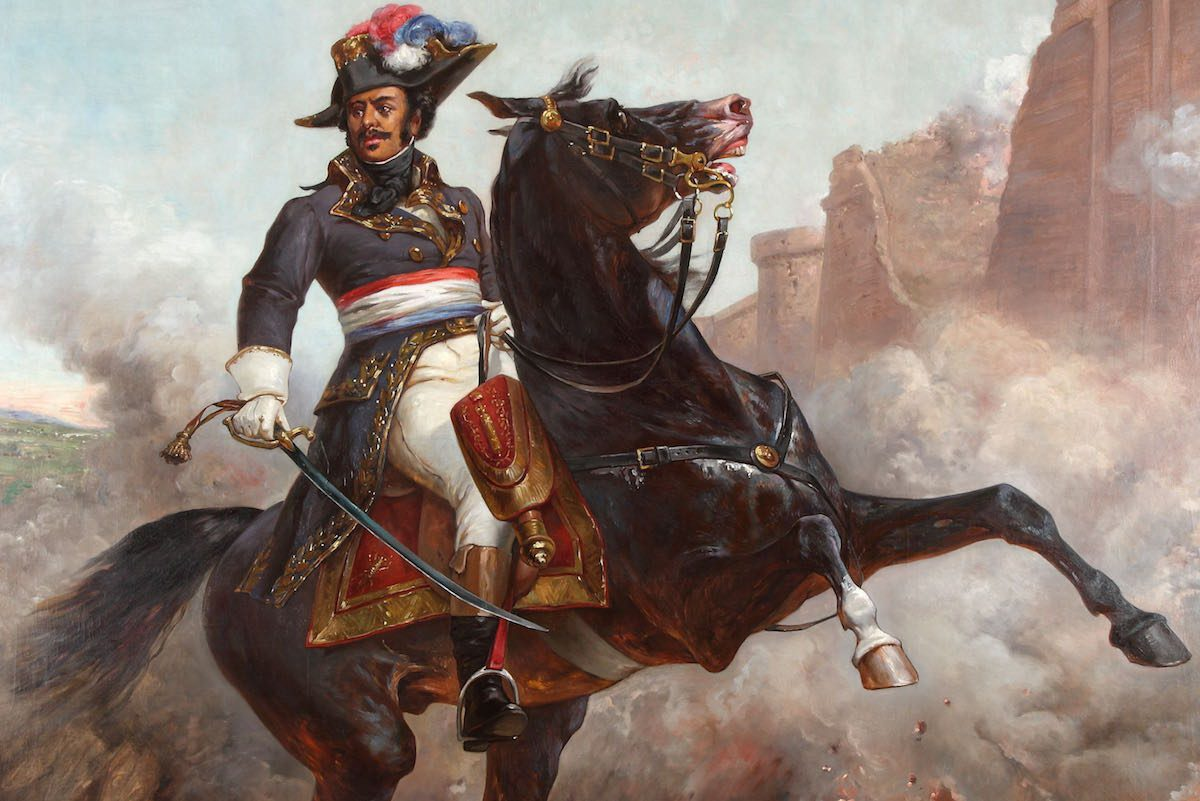
Alexandre Dumas (1762-1806)

In April and June 1791, the Parliament recruited (400,000) volunteers from the entire French National Guard for the French Revolutionary Army. Chevalier de Saint-Georges was the first person to sign in Lille and appointed captain. St. Georges commanded the company of volunteers that held the line at Baisieux near the Belgian border. On 7 September 1792, the Parliament established a light cavalry consisting of volunteers from the West Indies and Africa. The name of it was "Légion franche de cavalerie des Américains et du Midi", but it was often referred to as "Légion St-Georges". Banat described it as "probably the first all non-white military unit" (in Europe). The legion stationed in Lille comprised seven companies, of which only one was made up of coloured men, while the remainder comprised European-whites. St. Georges was appointed colonel in September 1792; Alexandre Dumas was one of the officers.

== Results ==
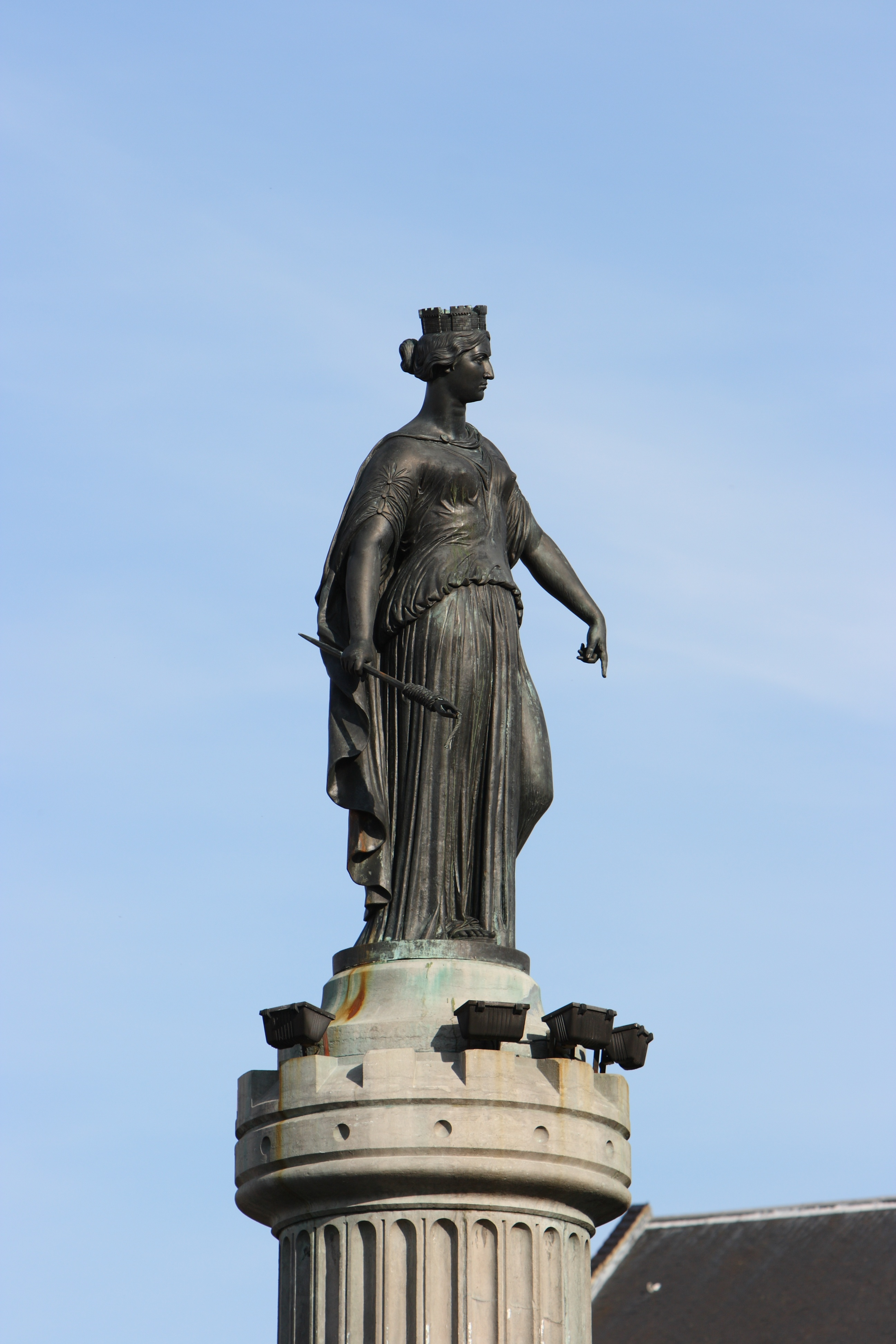
Column of the Goddess

One source estimated French military losses as 100–200 dead and wounded. The Austrians reported 43 dead and 161 wounded and 20 siege cannons either burst or became unusable from continuous firing. The Austrians really had no chance of capturing such a strong fortress. Ruault reported to the government that one-fourth of the houses in Lille were burnt. The political commissioners asserted that 500 houses were destroyed and another 2,000 damaged; the Church of Saint-Étienne was wrecked. One writer suggested that the damage was exaggerated for political purposes. Prudhomme attacked Duhoux in print for disobeying orders and Bourdonnaye for not relieving Lille sooner.

With Brunswick in full retreat, Dumouriez noticed that the large forces assembled to defend Lille could now be used for his pet project to invade Belgium. He secured permission from the French government to undertake his offensive and soon massed 80,000–100,000 troops for the purpose. Saxe-Teschen faced a very dangerous situation. The next major action was the Battle of Jemappes on 6 November 1792.
