= Bihucourt =

- Commune
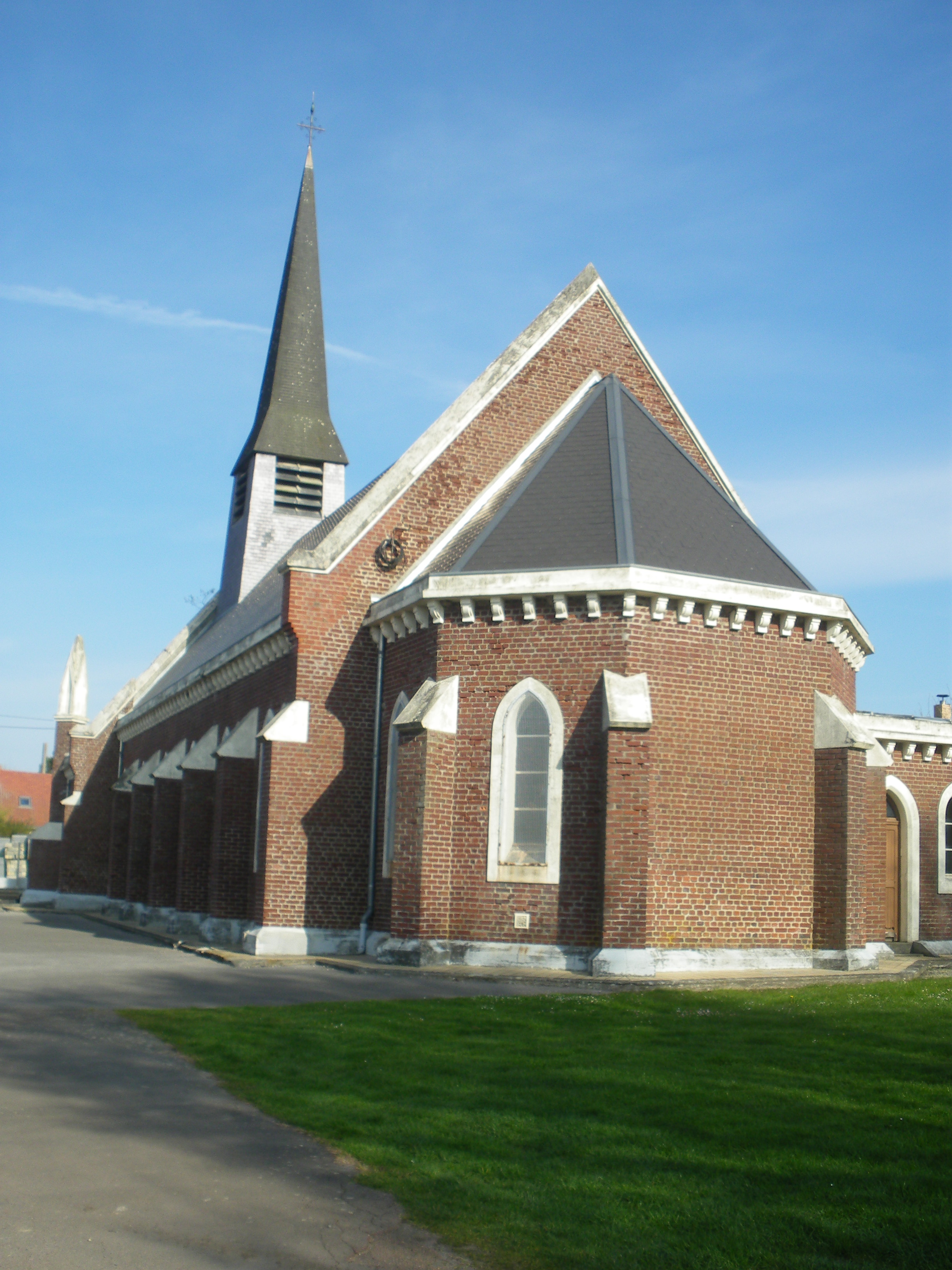
- The church of Bihucourt

- Coat of arms
- Location of Bihucourt
- Location within France Location within Hauts-de-France
- Coordinates: 50°07′36″N 2°48′02″E
- Country: France
- Region: Hauts-de-France
- Department: Pas-de-Calais
- Arrondissement: Arras
- Canton: Bapaume
- Intercommunality: CC du Sud-Artois

Government
  - Mayor (2020–2026): Benoît-Vincent Caille
- Area^{1}: 4.67 km^{2} (1.80 sq mi)
- Elevation: 116 m (381 ft)
- Highest elevation: 131 m (430 ft)
- Lowest elevation: 102 m (335 ft)
- Population (2023): 286
  - Density: 61.2/km^{2} (159/sq mi)
- Time zone: UTC+01:00 (CET)
  - Summer (DST): UTC+02:00 (CEST)
- INSEE/Postal code: 62131 /62121
- ^{1} French Land Register data, which excludes lakes, ponds, glaciers > 1 km^{2} (0.386 sq mi or 247 acres) and river estuaries.

Bihucourt (French pronunciation: [bi.ykuʁ]) is a commune in the Pas-de-Calais department in the Hauts-de-France region in northern France.

Bihucourt was struck by an EF3 tornado on 23 October 2022, causing significant damage in the area.

== Geography ==
A farming village located 11 miles (18 km) south of Arras at the junction of the D31 and the D7.

== Population ==
Historical population
Year	Pop.	±% p.a.
1968	328	—
1975	262	−3.16%
1982	289	+1.41%
1990	307	+0.76%
1999	305	−0.07%
2007	358	+2.02%
2012	357	−0.06%
2017	351	−0.34%
2023	286	−3.36%
Source: INSEE

== Sights ==
- The church of St. Vaast, which, like most of the village, was rebuilt after the ravages of World War I.
- The war memorial.

== See also ==
- Communes of the Pas-de-Calais department
