= Jean-Baptiste André Ruault de La Bonnerie =

- Born: 4 February 1744; Paris, France
- Died: 13 April 1817 (aged 73) Graz, Austria
- Allegiance: Kingdom of France; France (Habsburg monarchy) Habsburg Austria
- Branch: Infantry
- Service years: (Kingdom of France) 1760–1792 (France) 1792–1793 (Habsburg monarchy) 1793–1817
- Rank: General-major
- Conflicts: War of the First Coalition; Siege of Lille; Siege of Maastricht; Battle of Neerwinden
- Awards: Order of Saint-Louis, 1781

Jean-Baptiste André Isidore Ruault de La Bonnerie (4 February 1744 – 13 April 1817) became a French general officer early in the War of the First Coalition and later emigrated to Habsburg Austria under which he also was a general. He joined the French Royal Army in 1760 and became a general of brigade in 1792. He commanded the French defenders during the 1792 Siege of Lille. After fighting at Maastricht and Neerwinden he followed Charles François Dumouriez and other generals in defecting to Austria. He entered Habsburg service as a colonel and became a General-major in 1804. He died in 1817 at Graz.
