= Nivelle =

- Commune
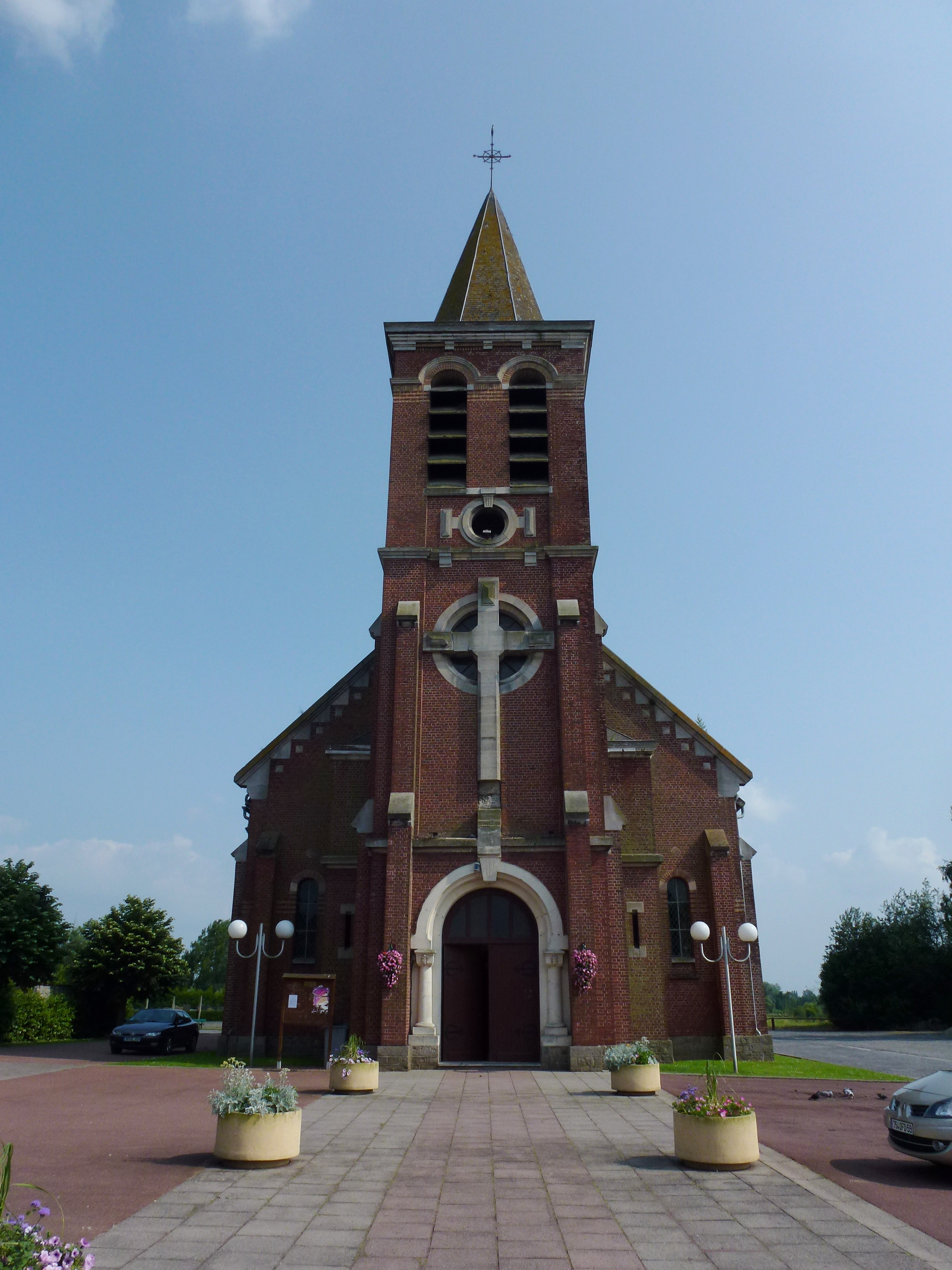
- The church in Nivelle

- Coat of arms
- Location of Nivelle
- Location within France Location within Hauts-de-France
- Coordinates: 50°28′24″N 3°28′05″E
- Country: France
- Region: Hauts-de-France
- Department: Nord
- Arrondissement: Valenciennes
- Canton: Saint-Amand-les-Eaux
- Intercommunality: CA Porte du Hainaut

Government
  - Mayor (2020–2026): Jacques Dubois
- Area^{1}: 5.92 km^{2} (2.29 sq mi)
- Elevation: 22 m (72 ft)
- Highest elevation: 27 m (89 ft)
- Lowest elevation: 14 m (46 ft)
- Population (2023): 1,406
  - Density: 238/km^{2} (615/sq mi)
- Time zone: UTC+01:00 (CET)
  - Summer (DST): UTC+02:00 (CEST)
- INSEE/Postal code: 59434 /59230
- ^{1} French Land Register data, which excludes lakes, ponds, glaciers > 1 km^{2} (0.386 sq mi or 247 acres) and river estuaries.

Nivelle (French pronunciation: [nivɛl]) is a commune in the Nord department in northern France.

== Heraldry ==
Arms of Nivelle	The arms of Nivelle are blazoned : Or, a cross gules. (Bruille-Saint-Amand, Flines-lès-Mortagne, Mortagne-du-Nord and Nivelle use the same arms.)

== See also ==
- Communes of the Nord department
- Nivelle Offensive
