= Bruille-Saint-Amand =

- Commune
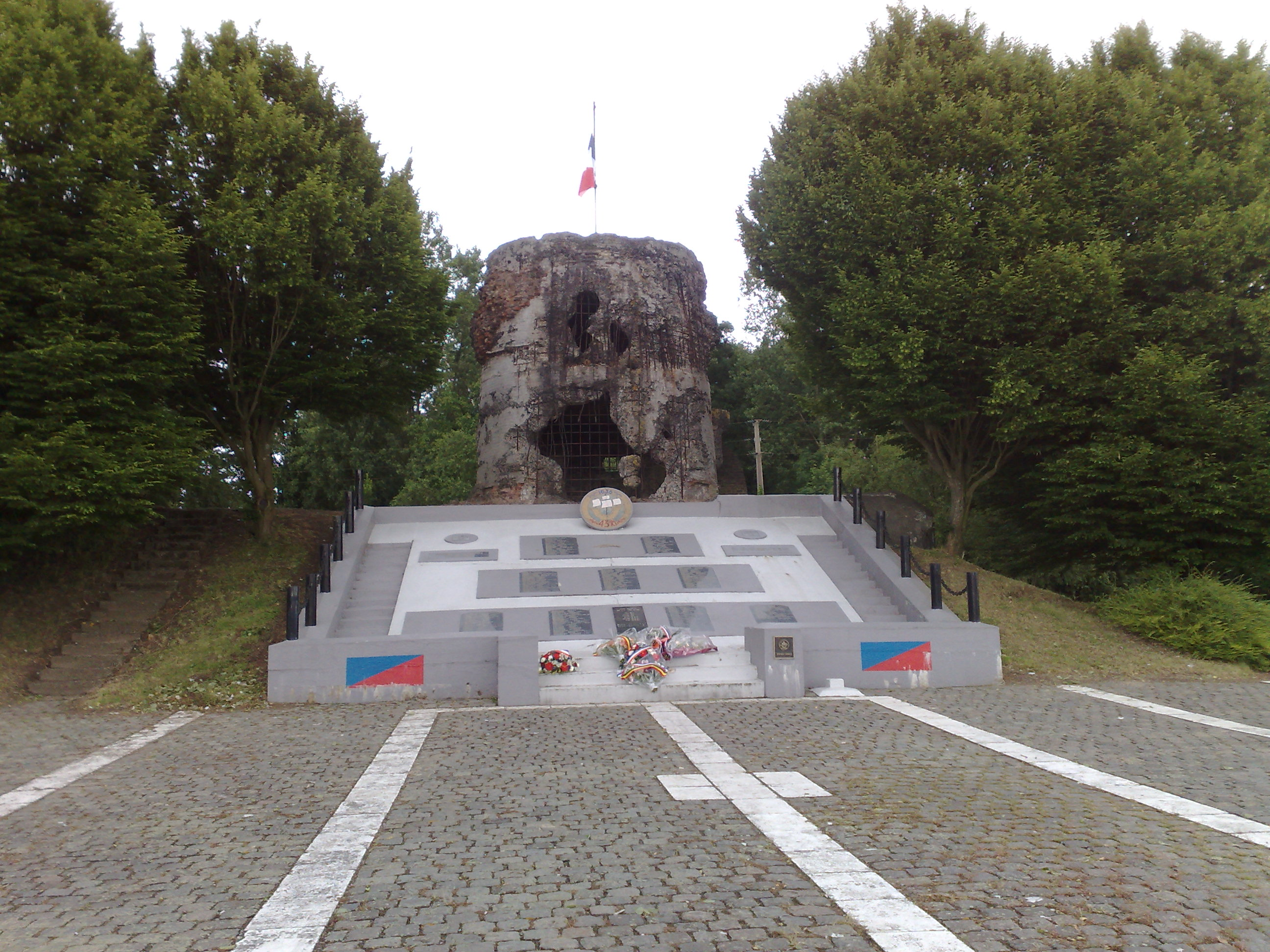
- The ruins of the mill, and memorial

- Coat of arms
- Location of Bruille-Saint-Amand
- Location within France Location within Hauts-de-France
- Coordinates: 50°28′24″N 3°30′03″E
- Country: France
- Region: Hauts-de-France
- Department: Nord
- Arrondissement: Valenciennes
- Canton: Saint-Amand-les-Eaux
- Intercommunality: CA Porte du Hainaut

Government
  - Mayor (2020–2026): Christophe Pannier
- Area^{1}: 7.88 km^{2} (3.04 sq mi)
- Elevation: 40 m (130 ft)
- Highest elevation: 38 m (125 ft)
- Lowest elevation: 16 m (52 ft)
- Population (2023): 1,698
  - Density: 215/km^{2} (558/sq mi)
- Time zone: UTC+01:00 (CET)
  - Summer (DST): UTC+02:00 (CEST)
- INSEE/Postal code: 59114 /59199
- ^{1} French Land Register data, which excludes lakes, ponds, glaciers > 1 km^{2} (0.386 sq mi or 247 acres) and river estuaries.

Bruille-Saint-Amand (French pronunciation: [bʁɥij sɛ̃.t‿amɑ̃]) is a commune in the Nord department in northern France.

== Population ==
Historical population
Year	Pop.	±% p.a.
1968	1,442	—
1975	1,381	−0.62%
1982	1,391	+0.10%
1990	1,473	+0.72%
1999	1,470	−0.02%
2007	1,465	−0.04%
2012	1,650	+2.41%
2017	1,671	+0.25%
2023	1,698	+0.27%
Source: INSEE

== Photos ==
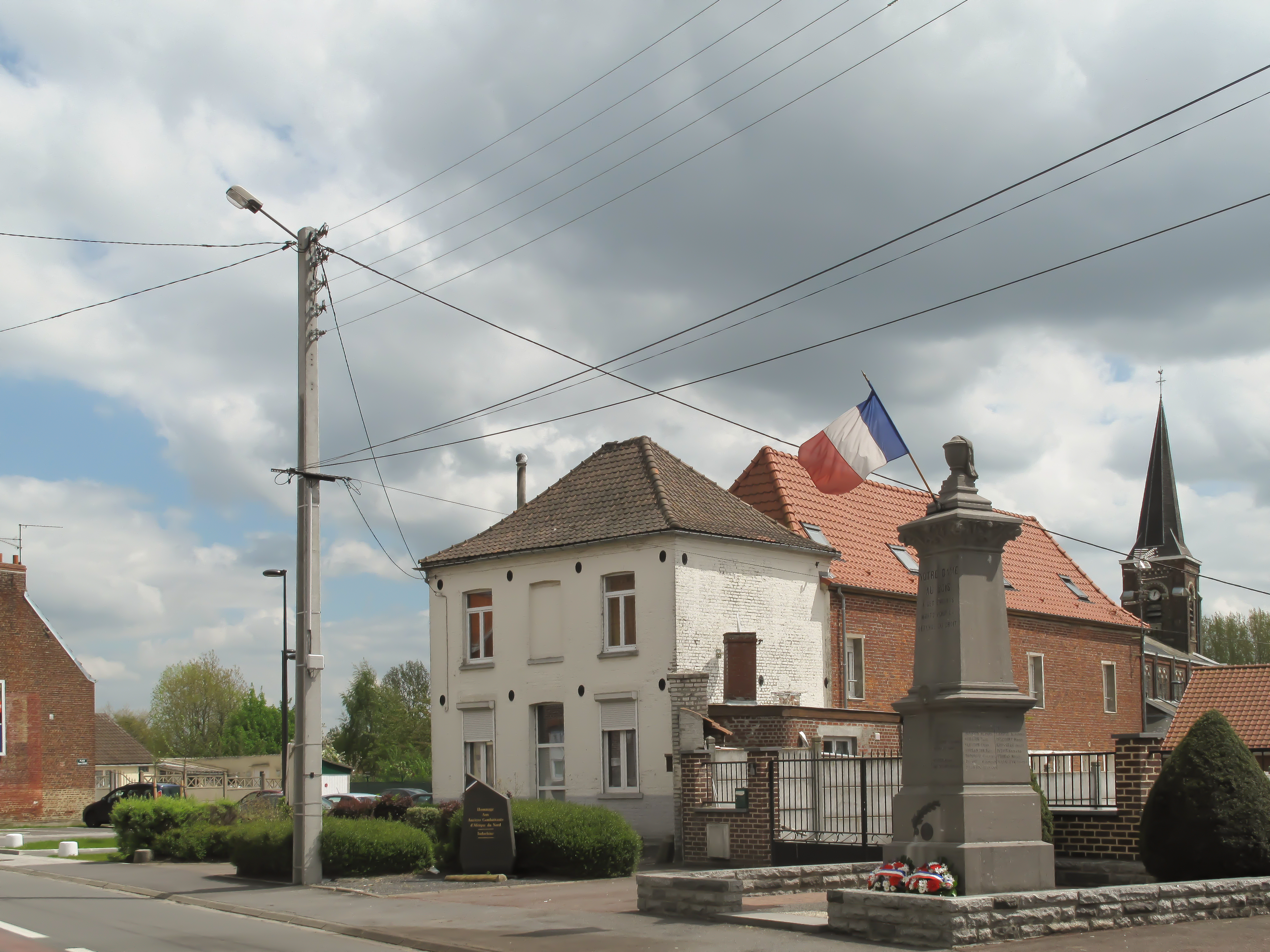
Bruille Saint Amand, war memorial and church

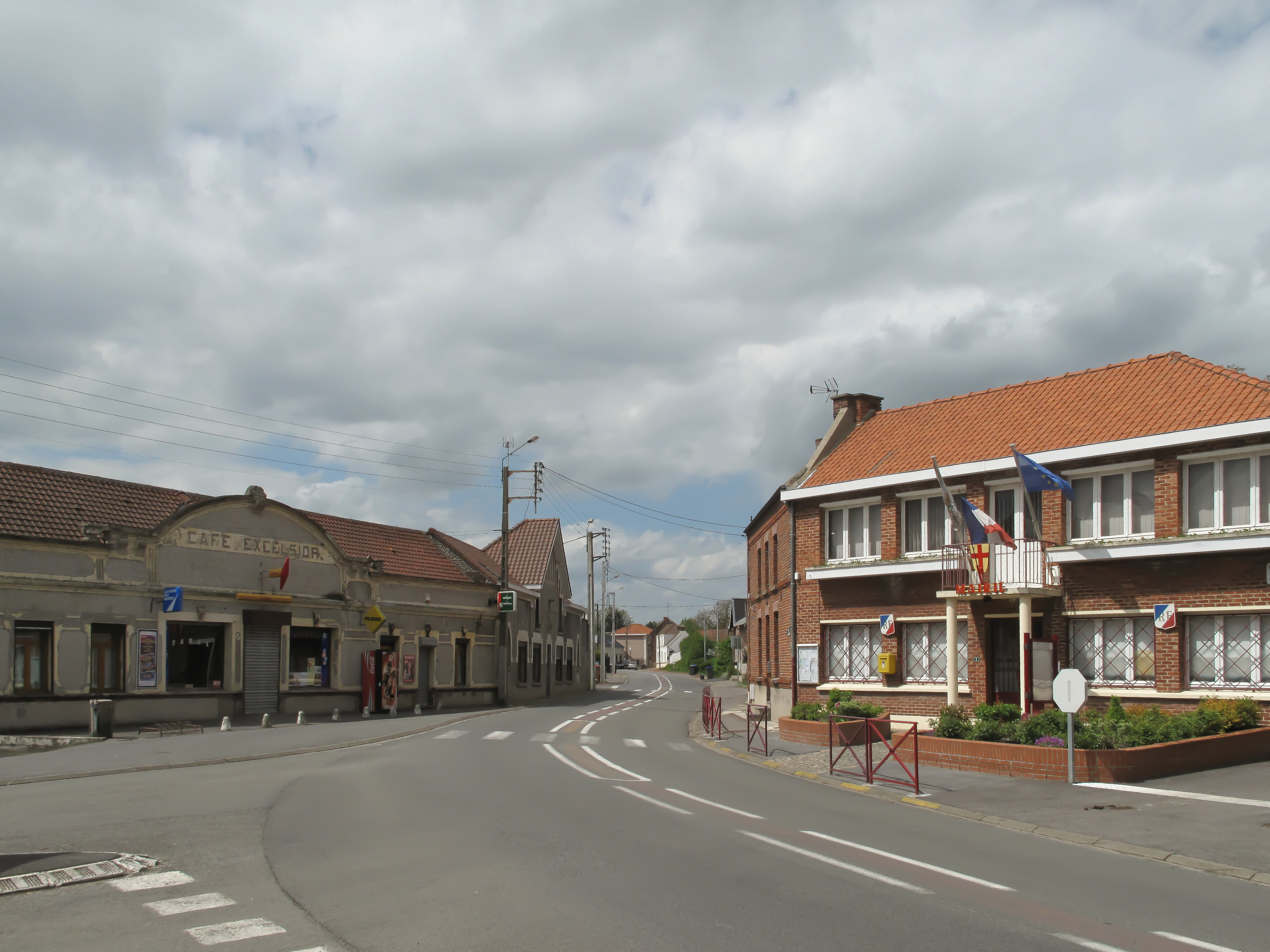
Bruille Sint Amand, view to a street: Rue Pasteur-Rue Henri Durre

== Heraldry ==
Arms of Bruille-Saint-Amand	The arms of Bruille-Saint-Amand are blazoned : Or, a cross gules. (Bruille-Saint-Amand, Flines-lès-Mortagne, Mortagne-du-Nord and Nivelle use the same arms.)

== See also ==
- Communes of the Nord department
