= Étrochey =

- Commune
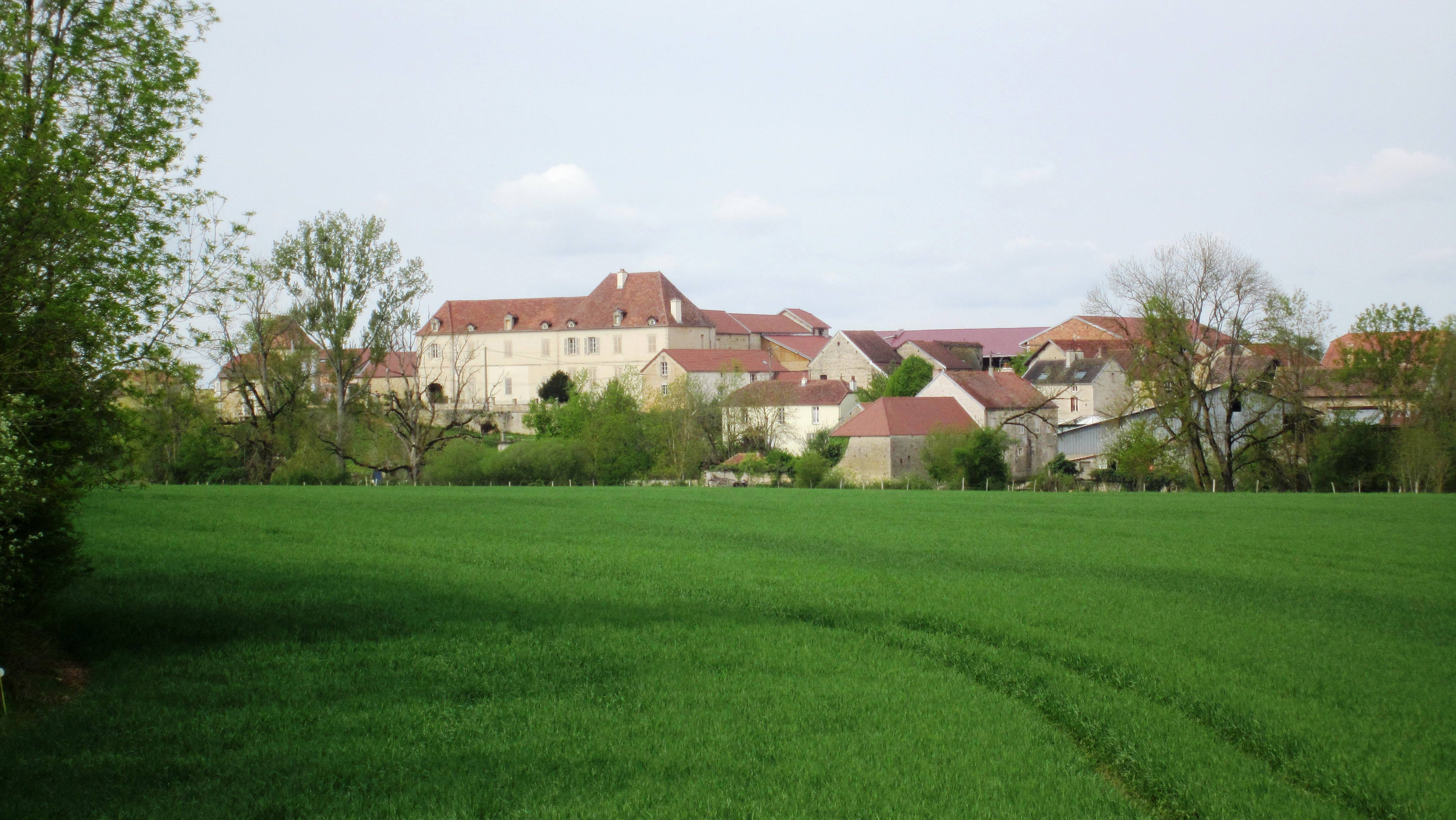
- A general view of Étrochey

- Coat of arms
- Location of Étrochey
- Location within France Location within Bourgogne-Franche-Comté
- Coordinates: 47°53′32″N 4°31′34″E
- Country: France
- Region: Bourgogne-Franche-Comté
- Department: Côte-d'Or
- Arrondissement: Montbard
- Canton: Châtillon-sur-Seine
- Intercommunality: Pays Châtillonnais

Government
  - Mayor (2020–2026): Joélle Payot
- Area^{1}: 3.21 km^{2} (1.24 sq mi)
- Elevation: 200 m (660 ft)
- Highest elevation: 236 m (774 ft)
- Lowest elevation: 203 m (666 ft)
- Population (2023): 203
  - Density: 63.2/km^{2} (164/sq mi)
- Time zone: UTC+01:00 (CET)
  - Summer (DST): UTC+02:00 (CEST)
- INSEE/Postal code: 21258 /21400
- ^{1} French Land Register data, which excludes lakes, ponds, glaciers > 1 km^{2} (0.386 sq mi or 247 acres) and river estuaries.

Étrochey (French pronunciation: [etʁɔʃɛ]) is a commune in the Côte-d'Or department in eastern France.

An EF3 tornado struck the town on 19 June 2013.

== Population ==
Historical population
Year	Pop.	±% p.a.
1968	178	—
1975	189	+0.86%
1982	189	+0.00%
1990	229	+2.43%
1999	221	−0.39%
2007	235	+0.77%
2012	223	−1.04%
2017	226	+0.27%
2023	203	−1.77%
Source: INSEE

== See also ==
- Communes of the Côte-d'Or department
