= Flines-lès-Mortagne =

- Commune
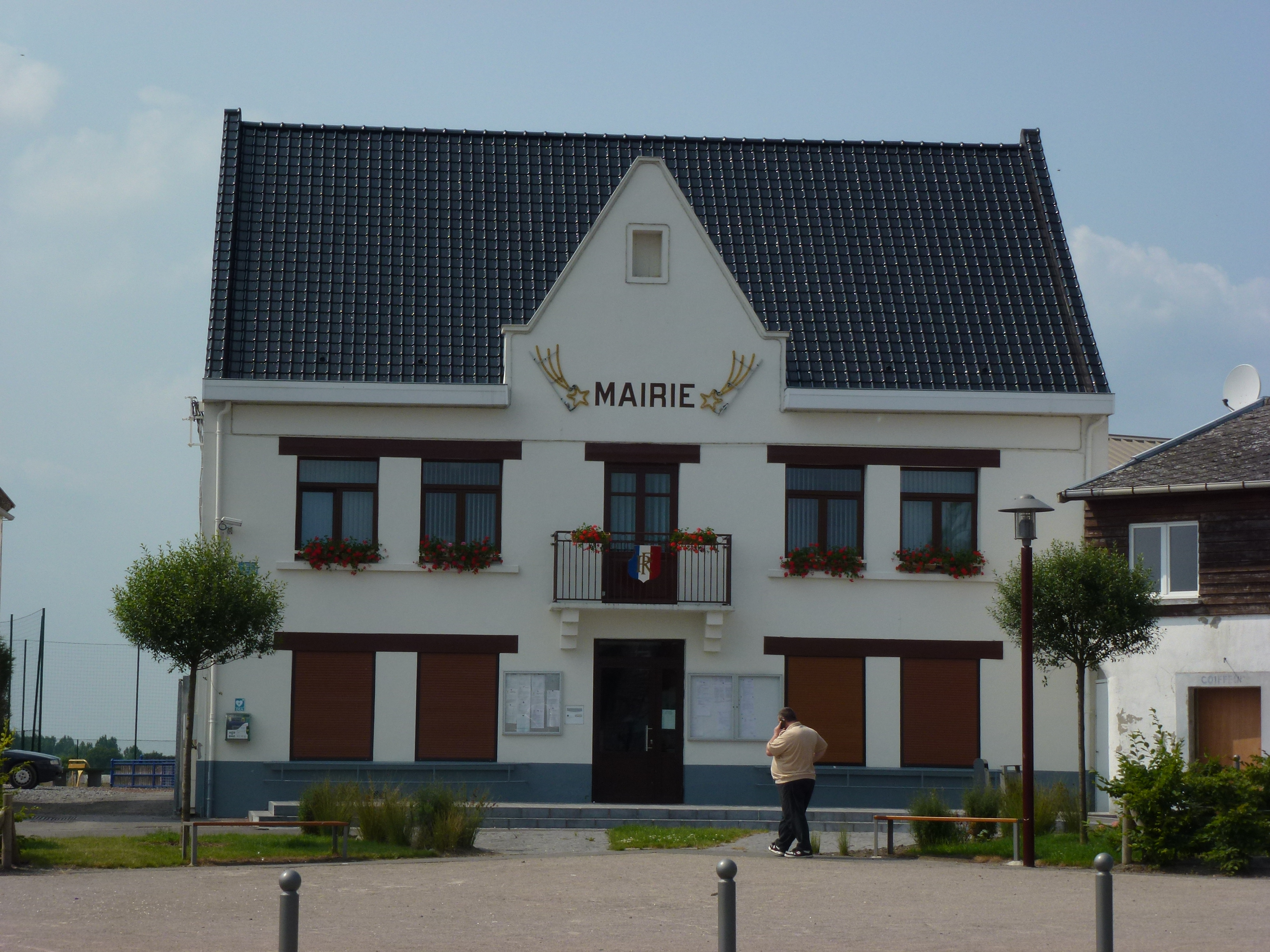
- The town hall in Flines-lès-Mortagne

- Coat of arms
- Location of Flines-lès-Mortagne
- Location within France Location within Hauts-de-France
- Coordinates: 50°30′28″N 3°28′02″E
- Country: France
- Region: Hauts-de-France
- Department: Nord
- Arrondissement: Valenciennes
- Canton: Saint-Amand-les-Eaux
- Intercommunality: CA Porte du Hainaut

Government
  - Mayor (2020–2026): Bernard Lebrun-Vandermouten
- Area^{1}: 14.45 km^{2} (5.58 sq mi)
- Elevation: 21 m (69 ft)
- Highest elevation: 46 m (151 ft)
- Lowest elevation: 13 m (43 ft)
- Population (2023): 1,685
  - Density: 116.6/km^{2} (302.0/sq mi)
- Time zone: UTC+01:00 (CET)
  - Summer (DST): UTC+02:00 (CEST)
- INSEE/Postal code: 59238 /59158
- ^{1} French Land Register data, which excludes lakes, ponds, glaciers > 1 km^{2} (0.386 sq mi or 247 acres) and river estuaries.

Flines-lès-Mortagne (French pronunciation: [flin lɛ mɔʁtaɲ], literally Flines near Mortagne) is a commune in the Nord department in northern France.

== Heraldry ==
Arms of Flines-lès-Mortagne	The arms of Flines-lès-Mortagne are blazoned : Or, a cross gules. (Bruille-Saint-Amand, Flines-lès-Mortagne, Mortagne-du-Nord and Nivelle use the same arms.)

== See also ==
- Communes of the Nord department
