= Gaudechart =

- Commune
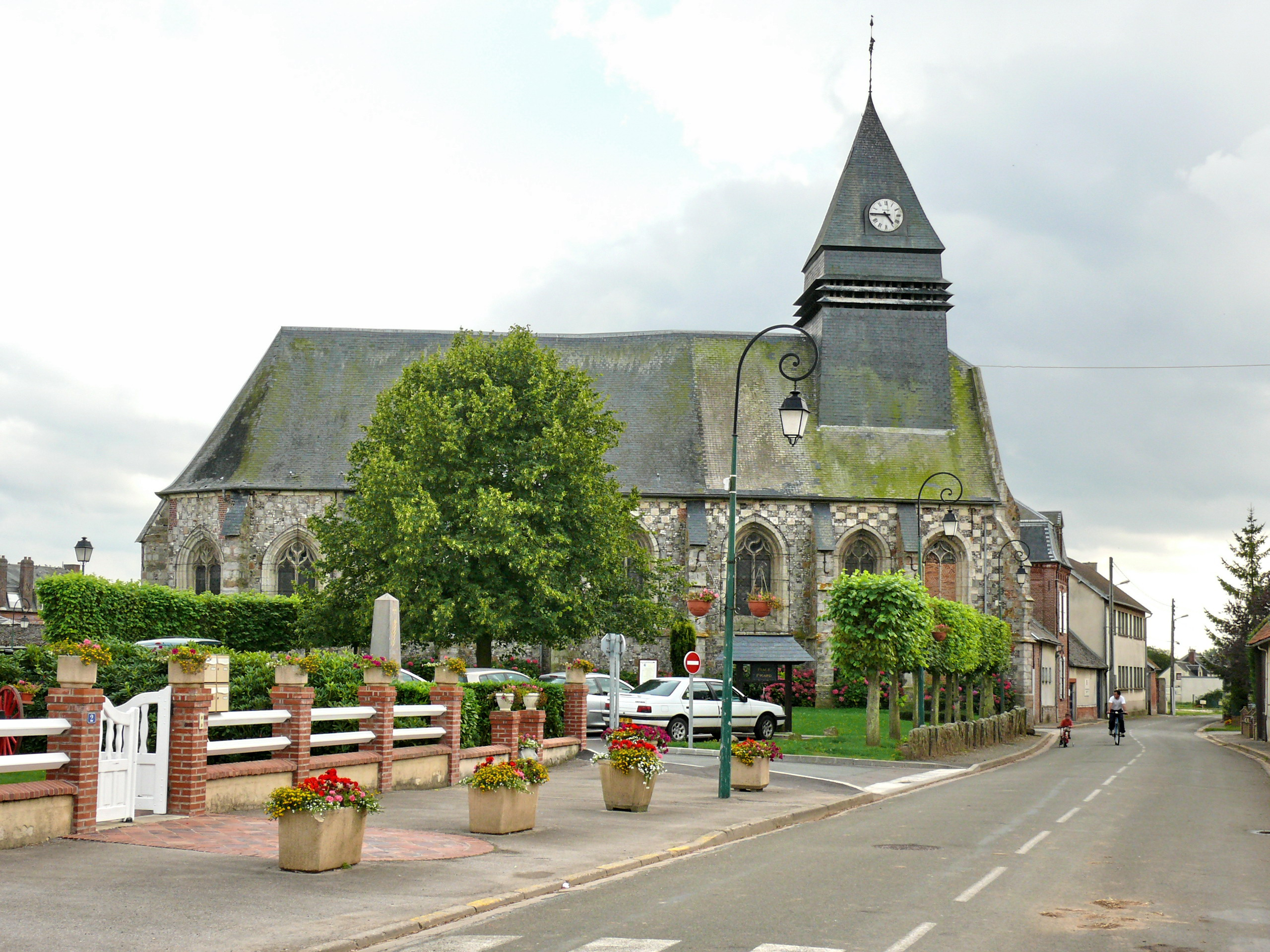
- The church in Gaudechart

- Coat of arms
- Location of Gaudechart
- Location within France Location within Hauts-de-France
- Coordinates: 49°36′58″N 1°57′44″E
- Country: France
- Region: Hauts-de-France
- Department: Oise
- Arrondissement: Beauvais
- Canton: Grandvilliers
- Intercommunality: Picardie Verte

Government
  - Mayor (2020–2026): Fabienne Cuvelier
- Area^{1}: 5.71 km^{2} (2.20 sq mi)
- Elevation: 198 m (650 ft)
- Highest elevation: 199 m (653 ft)
- Lowest elevation: 134 m (440 ft)
- Population (2023): 347
  - Density: 60.8/km^{2} (157/sq mi)
- Time zone: UTC+01:00 (CET)
  - Summer (DST): UTC+02:00 (CEST)
- INSEE/Postal code: 60269 /60210
- ^{1} French Land Register data, which excludes lakes, ponds, glaciers > 1 km^{2} (0.386 sq mi or 247 acres) and river estuaries.

Gaudechart (French pronunciation: [ɡodʃaʁ]) is a commune in the Oise department in northern France.

== See also ==
- Communes of the Oise department
