= Mortagne-du-Nord =

- Commune
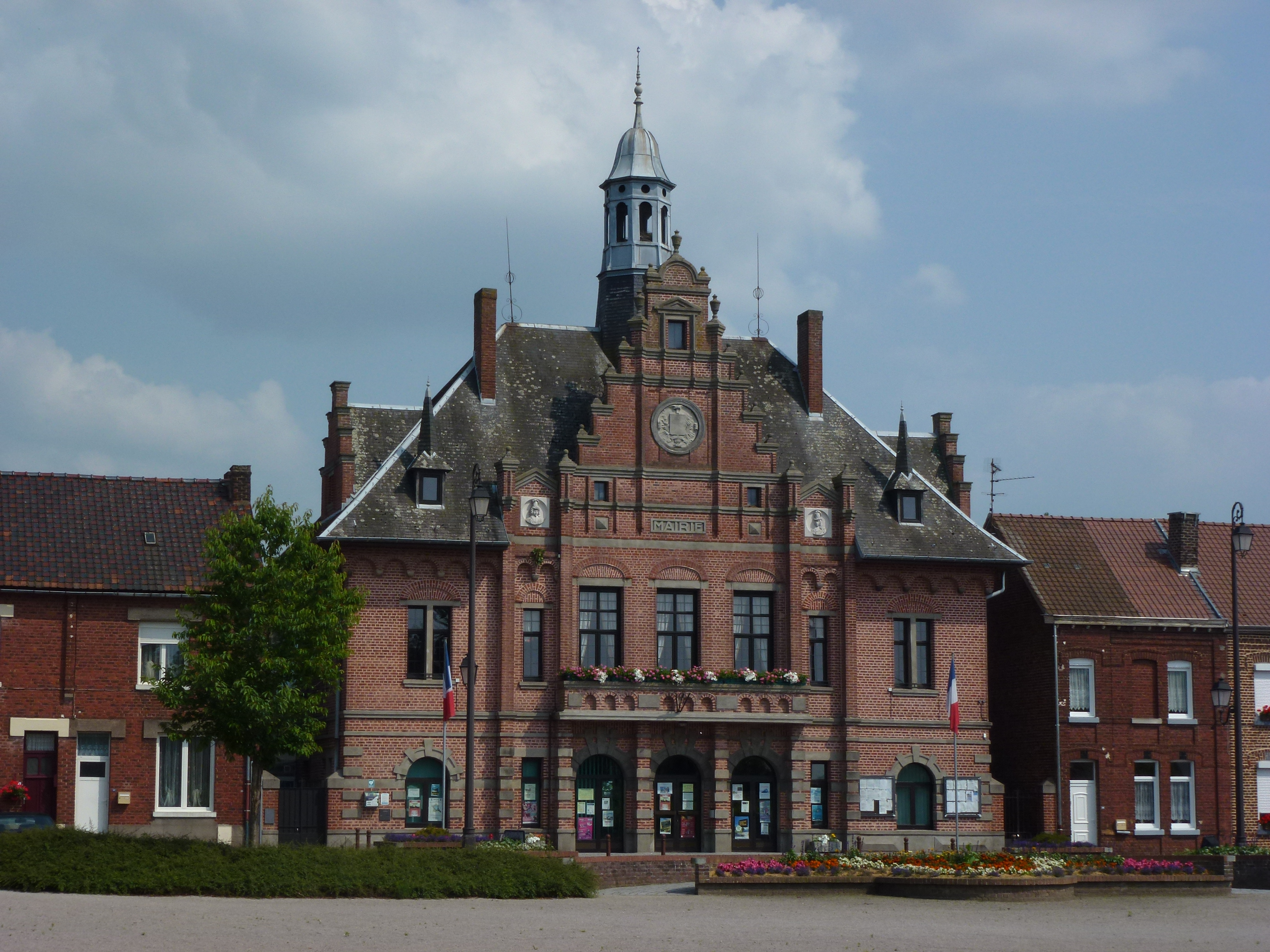
- The town hall in Mortagne-du-Nord

- Coat of arms
- Location of Mortagne-du-Nord
- Location within France Location within Hauts-de-France
- Coordinates: 50°29′56″N 3°27′11″E
- Country: France
- Region: Hauts-de-France
- Department: Nord
- Arrondissement: Valenciennes
- Canton: Saint-Amand-les-Eaux
- Intercommunality: CA Porte du Hainaut

Government
  - Mayor (2020–2026): Michel Quiévy
- Area^{1}: 2.18 km^{2} (0.84 sq mi)
- Elevation: 17 m (56 ft)
- Highest elevation: 65 m (213 ft)
- Lowest elevation: 14 m (46 ft)
- Population (2023): 1,599
  - Density: 733/km^{2} (1,900/sq mi)
- Time zone: UTC+01:00 (CET)
  - Summer (DST): UTC+02:00 (CEST)
- INSEE/Postal code: 59418 /59158
- ^{1} French Land Register data, which excludes lakes, ponds, glaciers > 1 km^{2} (0.386 sq mi or 247 acres) and river estuaries.

Mortagne-du-Nord (French pronunciation: [mɔʁtaɲ dy nɔʁ]) is a commune in the Nord department in northern France. It lies on the border with Belgium, on the river Scheldt.

== Heraldry ==
Arms of Mortagne-du-Nord	The arms of Mortagne-du-Nord are blazoned : Or, a cross gules. (Bruille-Saint-Amand, Flines-lès-Mortagne, Mortagne-du-Nord and Nivelle use the same arms.)

== See also ==
- Communes of the Nord department
