= 173rd Siege Battery, Royal Garrison Artillery =

173rd Siege Battery, RGA
- Cap Badge of the Royal Regiment of Artillery
- Active: 21 June 1916–1919
- Country: United Kingdom
- Branch: British Army
- Role: Siege Artillery
- Part of: Royal Garrison Artillery
- Garrison/HQ: Falmouth, Cornwall
- Engagements: Battle of the Ancre; Battle of Vimy Ridge; Third Battle of Ypres; Battle of Cambrai; Hundred Days Offensive; Battle of the Selle

173rd Siege Battery was a unit of Britain's Royal Garrison Artillery (RGA) formed during World War I. It served on the Western Front, including the Battles of Vimy Ridge, Third Ypres and Cambrai, and the crushing victories of the Allied Hundred Days Offensive in 1918.

== Mobilisation ==
173rd Siege Battery was formed at Falmouth, Cornwall under Army Council Instruction 1239 of 21 June 1916, based upon a cadre of 3 officers and 78 other ranks (the establishment of a TF garrison company) supplied by the Cornwall (Duke of Cornwall's) Royal Garrison Artillery, a coast defence unit of the Territorial Force based in Falmouth. It went out to the Western Front on 3 October 1916, manning four 6-inch 26 cwt howitzers, and joined 48th Heavy Artillery Group (HAG) in Third Army on 10 October.

== Service ==
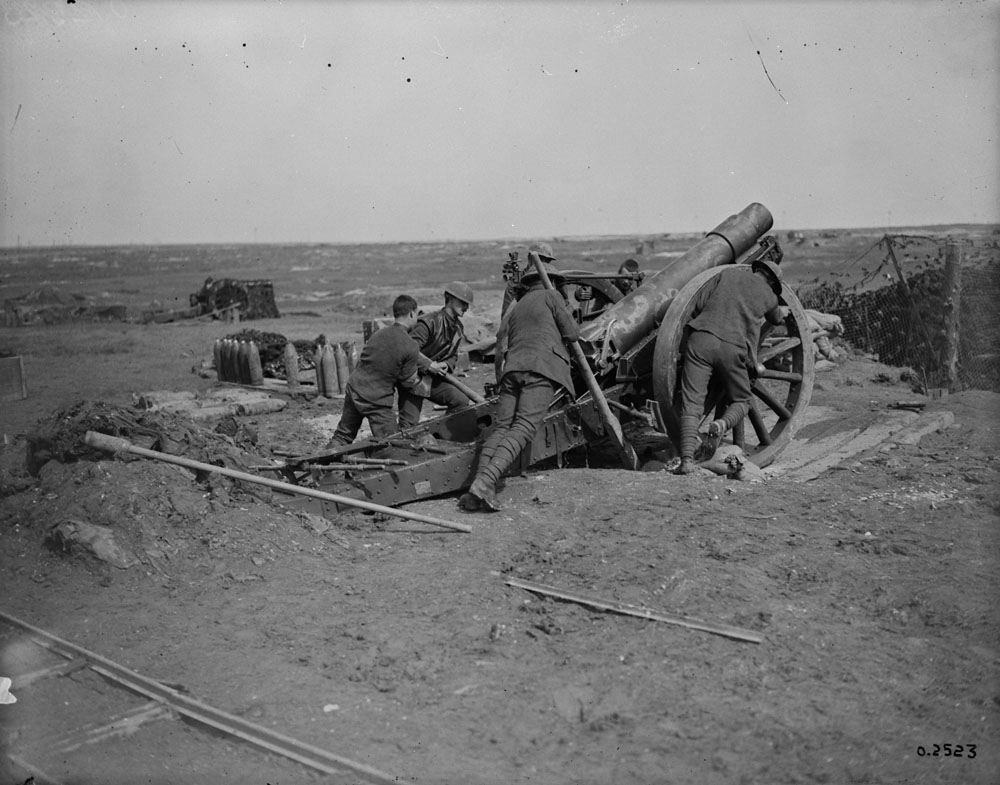
Crew positioning a 6-inch 26 cwt howitzer.

=== Ancre Heights ===
The practice was to move batteries between HAGs as required, and 173rd Siege Bty rapidly transferred to 40th HAG with Fifth Army on 18 October. Fifth Army was engaged in the Battle of the Ancre Heights, the last phase of that summer's Somme Offensive. The fighting ground on despite increasingly bad weather, culminating in the Battle of the Ancre (13–18 November). 173rd Siege Bty remained with Fifth Army during the winter, switching to 10th HAG on 11 December, and back to 40th HAG on 2 February, while Fifth Army carried out a series of small Operations on the Ancre, January–March 1917.

=== Vimy ===
On 21 March 1917, 173rd Siege Bty was transferred north to join 63rd HAG with First Army, which was preparing for the Battle of Vimy Ridge. 63rd HAG was assigned to I Corps. The artillery plan for the heavy guns before the attack emphasised counter-battery (CB) fire. At Zero hour, while the field guns laid down a Creeping barrage to protect the advancing infantry, the heavy howitzers fired 450 yards (410 m) further ahead to hit the rear areas on the reverse slope of the ridge, especially known gun positions. The attack went in on 9 April with I Corps and Canadian Corps successfully capturing Vimy Ridge while Third Army attacked further south near Arras. The only hold-up on 9 April was at Hill 145, near the north end of the Canadian attack, and the capture of this position was completed the next day. Fighting in the southern sector (the Battle of Arras) continued into May.

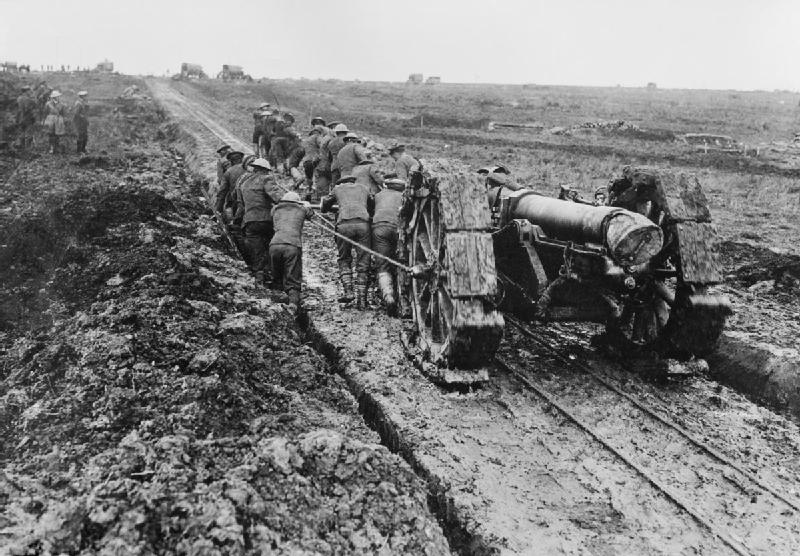
6-inch howitzer being moved through mud on the Western Front.

=== Ypres ===
173rd Siege Bty switched to 79th HAG on 16 April and 15th HAG on 5 May, while remaining with First Army. Then on 10 July 1917 it moved to 56th HAG which was joining Fifth Army for the forthcoming Third Ypres Offensive. Gun batteries were packed into the Ypres Salient where they were under observation and CB fire from the Germans on the higher ground. Casualties among guns and gunners were high, even before the offensive opened with the Battle of Pilckem Ridge on 1 August, when Fifth Army failed to make much progress. A second push on 16 August (the Battle of Langemarck) suffered from rushed artillery planning and was unsuccessful. The offensive continued through the summer and autumn of 1917, but after a short spell with 55th HAG (8–17 September) 173rd Siege Bty was relieved and sent back to Third Army, where it joined 17th HAG, changing to 4th HAG on 14 November.

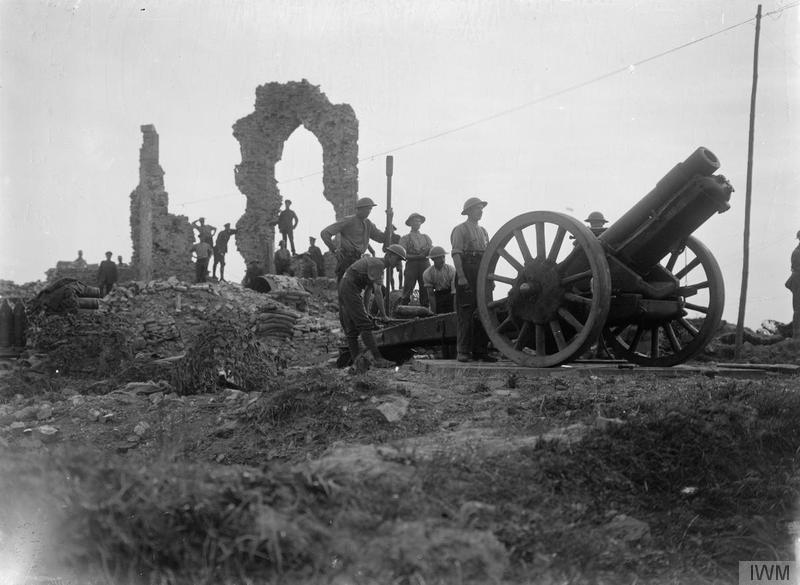
6-inch howitzer and crew during the Ypres offensive, 1917.

=== Cambrai ===
Third Army was preparing for its surprise attack with tanks at the Battle of Cambrai. There was to be no preliminary bombardment or registration shots, and the guns were to open fire at Zero hour firing 'off the map' at carefully surveyed targets. When the battle began with a crash of artillery at 06.20 on 20 November the German defenders were stunned, and the massed tanks completed their overcome. In most areas the attack was an outstanding success. Exploitation over succeeding days was less spectacular, though some bombardments were set up to help the infantry take certain villages. On 30 November the Germans put in a heavy counter-attack against the weakened troops in the ill-organised captured positions, which they quickly overran, and Third Army had to scramble to set up a defensible line for the winter.

173rd Siege Bty continued to change command within Third Army, to 32nd HAG on 14 December and then 54th HAG on 29 December. However, by now HAG allocations were becoming more fixed, and on 1 February 1918 they were converted into permanent RGA brigades. 54th Brigade was defined as an 8-inch Howitzer Brigade, though most of the batteries like 173rd were equipped with 6-inch howitzers. 173rd Siege Bty remained with this brigade until the Armistice.

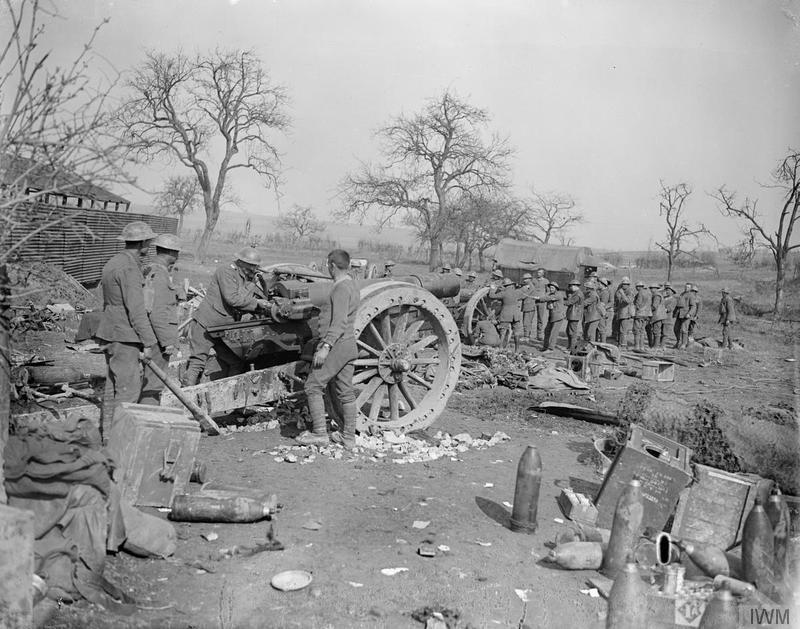
6-inch howitzers during the Spring Offensive.

=== Spring Offensive ===
When the German spring offensive began on 21 March 1918, part of Third Army was engaged in the desperate fighting, but overall it was not obliged to retreat as far or to abandon as many heavy guns as Fifth Army further south. The German offensive had been halted on Third Army's front by 5 April.

=== Hundred Days ===
Third Army joined in the Allies' victorious Hundred Days Offensive with the Battle of Albert on 23–24 August, and continued with the Battles of the Scarpe (26–30 August), the Drocourt-Quéant Switch Line (2–3 September) Havrincourt (12 September), Épehy (18 September), Canal du Nord (27 September–1 October) and Second Cambrai (8–10 October).

By 17 October, Third Army had closed up to the River Selle; now it prepared to seize a substantial bridgehead for further advances. 54th Brigade was assigned to V Corps for the assault crossing on 20 October (the Battle of the Selle), which was to be carried out as a surprise, with no preliminary bombardment, with a Zero hour of 02.00, when the moon would be full. Half of the corps' heavy artillery fired a creeping barrage, halting at each objective in turn, while the remainder carried out CB fire and bombarded specific targets. The infantry of 17th (Northern) and 38th (Welsh) Divisions crossed their footbridges, fought their way over the railway, through the village of Neuvilly and up onto the second of three successive ridges. The third ridge, the final objective for the day, proved troublesome, so a fresh barrage as put down on it at 16.00 and it was taken without further problems.

After the crossing of the Selle, and shortly afterwards of the Sambre Canal, the offensive turned into a pursuit, and most of the siege batteries had to be left behind. Fighting was ended on 11 November by the Armistice with Germany. Demobilisation began early in 1919. In the interim order of battle for the postwar army the battery was supposed to form 128th Bty RGA, but this was rescinded after the signing of the Treaty of Versailles, and the battery was disbanded in 1919.
