= Olympe Démarez =

French lawyer

- Born: 27 January 1878; Catillon-sur-Sambre
- Died: 5 September 1964 (aged 86)
- Occupation: Lawyer

Olympe Démarez (27 January 1878 – 5 September 1964) was the first French female lawyer in the French Nord department and the first woman to be elected to the city council of Dunkirk.

== Biography ==
Born in Catillon-sur-Sambre (Nord Department), Démarez had a very modest background, coming from a family of textile workers living in a hamlet. She obtained her first diploma from the hamlet's own primary school in August 1890. Démarez temporarily quit school to become a textile worker, but later was able to continue her education.

In 1898, at the age of 20, Démarez graduated school and became a teacher. She began work 180 kilometers away from her birthplace, which was somewhat unusual for her time and place due to the difficulty of travel. Démarez taught first in Petit-Fort-Philippe (Graveline's hamlet) from 1898 to 1901 and then in Dunkirk from 1902 to 1908.

At the age of 30, Démarez quit teaching to study law - rather a risky move, considering that it forced her to sacrifice her job security. Law classes were only just becoming available to women, and female law students were few and far between. To support herself and to finance her studies, she worked as a secretary at the office of Charles Valentin, a 27 year old lawyer who had recently registered at the Dunkirk bar association.

In 1913, after obtaining her associate degree in law, Démarez obtained her bachelor's degree from law school.

Charles Valentin, then the mayor of Dunkirk, became Démarez’s lover. Despite their unusual cohabitation lifestyle, the couple was well respected. On 20 September 1939, however, Valentin was victim of a serious traffic accident in the Lille suburbs. Despite the care of Oscar Lambret, a prominent Lille surgeon, his condition worsened. Démarez then asked the deputy mayor of Lille, Charles Saint-Venant, to marry them. Valentin died shortly after the ceremony.

During WWII, Démarez returned to her hometown to care for Jewish refugee children from Nazi Germany.

After the French Liberation, Dunkirk's mayor engaged her to reorganize the city's archives.

Women acquired the right to vote in 1944, and voted for the first time in the municipal elections of April 1945. Démarez became the first woman to be elected to the municipal council of Dunkirk in this election - the very first French election in which a woman could run.

Démarez died on 5 September 1964 at the age of 86.

== Career ==
Démarez worked as a school teacher first in Petit-Fort-Philippe (Graveline's hamlet) from 1898 to 1901 and then in Dunkirk from 1902 to 1908.

On 2 February 1914, before the Douai Court of Appeal, Démarez officially became a lawyer, 14 years after Jeanne Chauvin became the first female lawyer in France.

After Démarez, there were no other female lawyers admitted to the bar in France until 1920. This was due to the ongoing First World War, which put applications to the bar association on hold. Only after the end of hostilities, on 17 November 1920, was a new female applicant, Adrienne Gobert, admitted to the bar. However, Gobert never exercised the profession.

Démarez eventually put her law career aside to help a friend’s political campaign. She later worked at the town hall reorganizing the archives.
