= Troisvilles =

- Commune
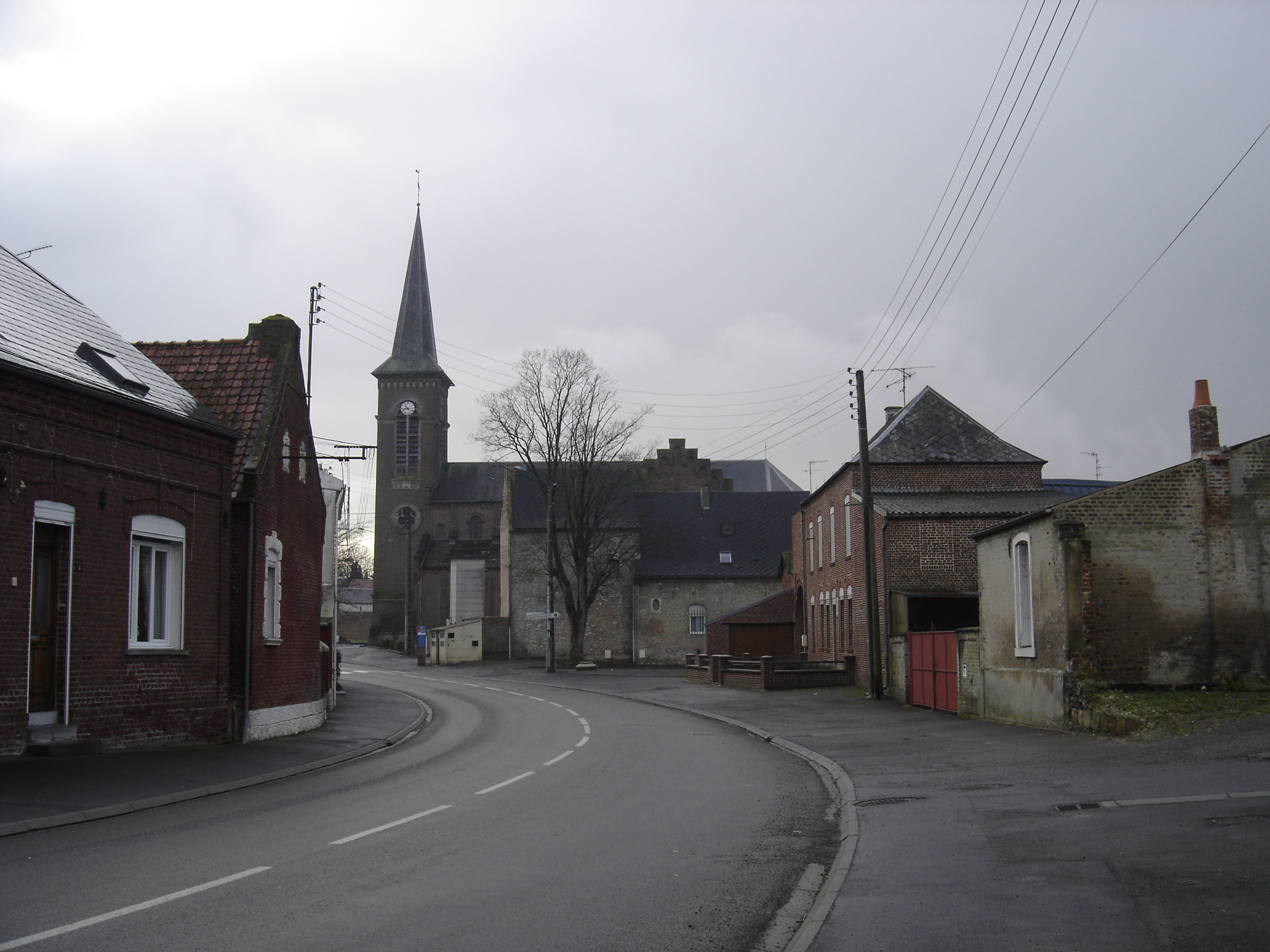
- The church in Troisvilles

- Coat of arms
- Location of Troisvilles
- Location within France Location within Hauts-de-France
- Coordinates: 50°06′23″N 3°28′16″E
- Country: France
- Region: Hauts-de-France
- Department: Nord
- Arrondissement: Cambrai
- Canton: Le Cateau-Cambrésis
- Intercommunality: CA Caudrésis–Catésis

Government
  - Mayor (2020–2026): Jérémy Richard
- Area^{1}: 8.42 km^{2} (3.25 sq mi)
- Highest elevation: 143 m (469 ft)
- Lowest elevation: 113 m (371 ft)
- Population (2023): 805
  - Density: 95.6/km^{2} (248/sq mi)
- Time zone: UTC+01:00 (CET)
  - Summer (DST): UTC+02:00 (CEST)
- INSEE/Postal code: 59604 /59980
- ^{1} French Land Register data, which excludes lakes, ponds, glaciers > 1 km^{2} (0.386 sq mi or 247 acres) and river estuaries.

Troisvilles (French pronunciation: [tʁwavil]) is a commune in the Nord department in northern France.

== Heraldry ==
Arms of Troisvilles	The arms of Troisvilles are blazoned : Azure, a chevron between 2 mullets of 6 and a trefoil Or. (Bertry and Troisvilles use the same arms.)

== See also ==
- Communes of the Nord department
