= Caullery =

- Commune
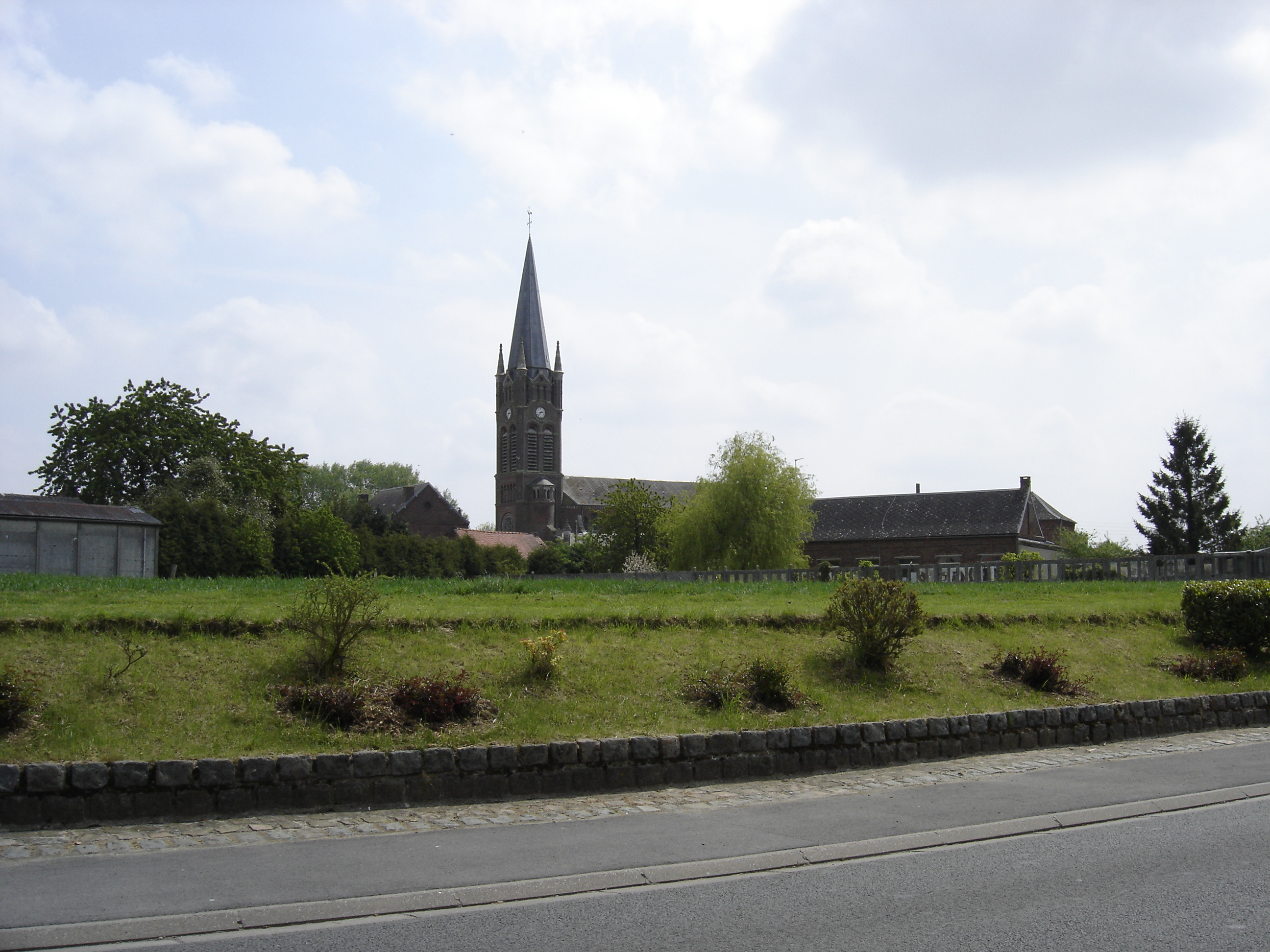
- A general view of Caullery

- Coat of arms
- Location of Caullery
- Location within France Location within Hauts-de-France
- Coordinates: 50°05′09″N 3°22′25″E
- Country: France
- Region: Hauts-de-France
- Department: Nord
- Arrondissement: Cambrai
- Canton: Le Cateau-Cambrésis
- Intercommunality: CA Caudrésis–Catésis

Government
  - Mayor (2020–2026): Alain Goetgheluck
- Area^{1}: 2.5 km^{2} (0.97 sq mi)
- Elevation: 107 m (351 ft)
- Highest elevation: 144 m (472 ft)
- Lowest elevation: 105 m (344 ft)
- Population (2023): 467
  - Density: 190/km^{2} (480/sq mi)
- Time zone: UTC+01:00 (CET)
  - Summer (DST): UTC+02:00 (CEST)
- INSEE/Postal code: 59140 /59191
- ^{1} French Land Register data, which excludes lakes, ponds, glaciers > 1 km^{2} (0.386 sq mi or 247 acres) and river estuaries.

Caullery (French pronunciation: [kolʁi]) is a commune of the Nord department in northern France.

== Heraldry ==
Arms of Caullery	The arms of Caullery are blazoned : Gules, 3 inescutcheons, each charged with a lion sable.

== See also ==
- Communes of the Nord department
