= Walincourt-Selvigny =

- Commune
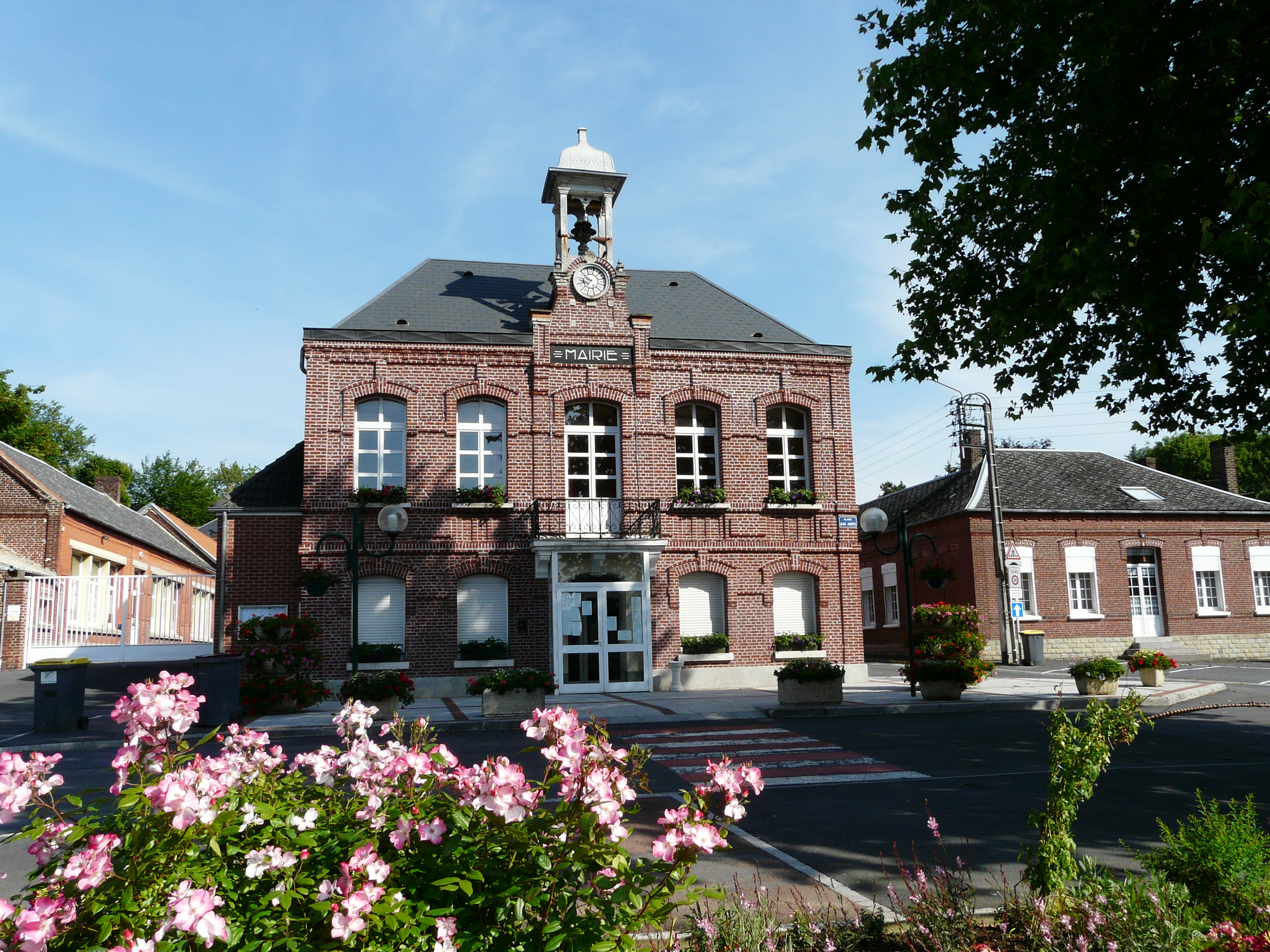
- The town hall in Walincourt-Selvigny

- Coat of arms
- Location of Walincourt-Selvigny
- Location within France Location within Hauts-de-France
- Coordinates: 50°04′09″N 3°20′12″E
- Country: France
- Region: Hauts-de-France
- Department: Nord
- Arrondissement: Cambrai
- Canton: Le Cateau-Cambrésis
- Intercommunality: CA Caudrésis–Catésis

Government
  - Mayor (2020–2026): Jérôme Méli
- Area^{1}: 15.07 km^{2} (5.82 sq mi)
- Elevation: 137 m (449 ft)
- Highest elevation: 152 m (499 ft)
- Lowest elevation: 85 m (279 ft)
- Population (2023): 2,081
  - Density: 138.1/km^{2} (357.6/sq mi)
- Time zone: UTC+01:00 (CET)
  - Summer (DST): UTC+02:00 (CEST)
- INSEE/Postal code: 59631 /59127
- ^{1} French Land Register data, which excludes lakes, ponds, glaciers > 1 km^{2} (0.386 sq mi or 247 acres) and river estuaries.

Walincourt-Selvigny (French pronunciation: [walɛ̃kuʁ sɛlviɲi]) is a commune in the Nord department in northern France. It was formed in 1973 by the merger of the former communes Walincourt and Selvigny.

== Population ==
Historical population
Year	Pop.	±% p.a.
1968	2,377	—
1975	2,340	−0.22%
1982	2,233	−0.67%
1990	2,168	−0.37%
1999	2,105	−0.33%
2007	2,049	−0.34%
2012	2,095	+0.45%
2017	2,136	+0.39%
2023	2,081	−0.43%
Source: INSEE

== See also ==
- Communes of the Nord department
