= Beaumont-en-Cambrésis =

- Commune
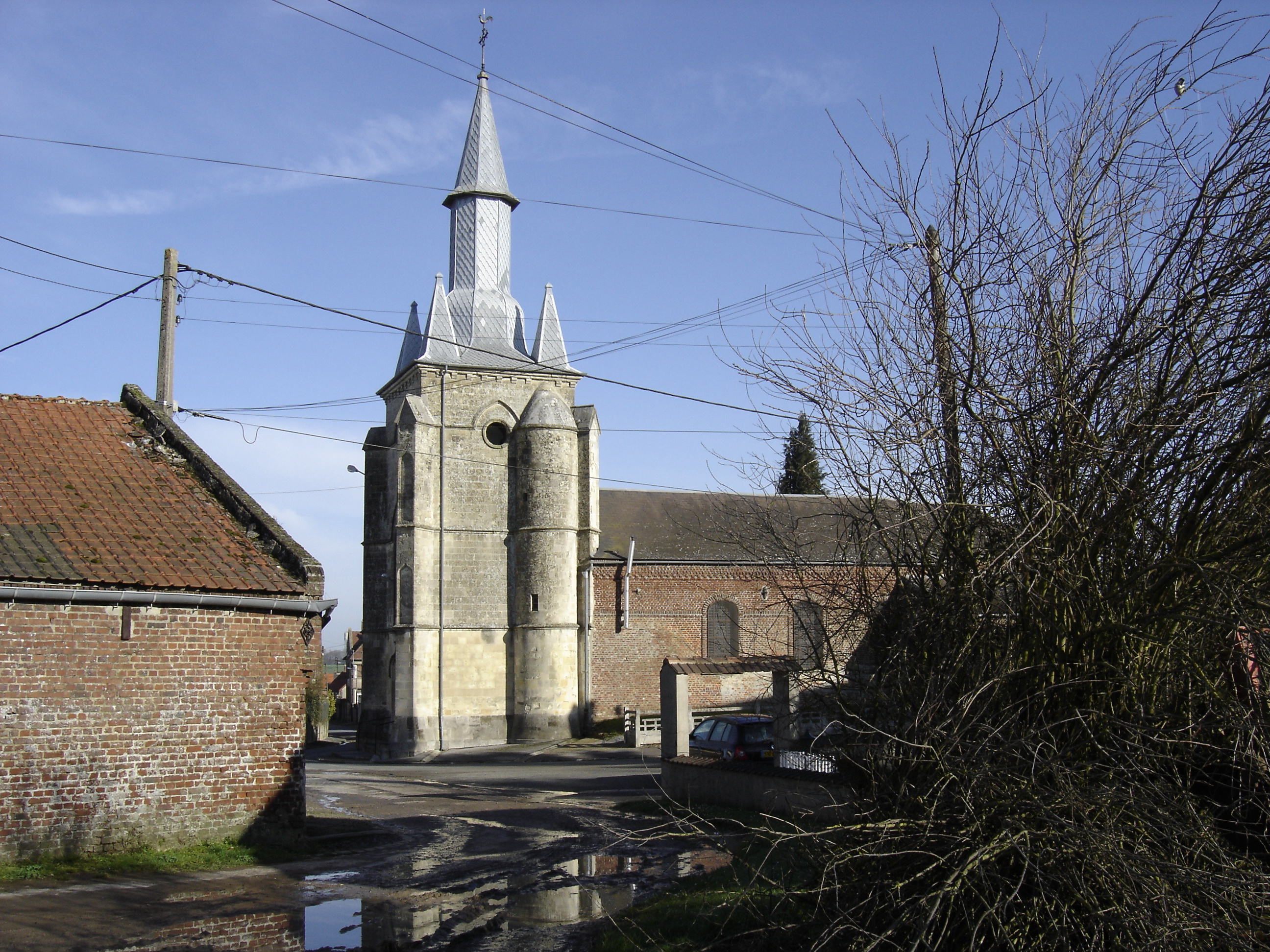
- Saint-Laurent church

- Coat of arms
- Location of Beaumont-en-Cambrésis
- Location within France Location within Hauts-de-France
- Coordinates: 50°07′25″N 3°27′19″E
- Country: France
- Region: Hauts-de-France
- Department: Nord
- Arrondissement: Cambrai
- Canton: Le Cateau-Cambrésis
- Intercommunality: CA Caudrésis–Catésis

Government
  - Mayor (2020–2026): Fabrice Baccout
- Area^{1}: 3.31 km^{2} (1.28 sq mi)
- Highest elevation: 138 m (453 ft)
- Lowest elevation: 95 m (312 ft)
- Population (2023): 458
  - Density: 138/km^{2} (358/sq mi)
- Time zone: UTC+01:00 (CET)
  - Summer (DST): UTC+02:00 (CEST)
- INSEE/Postal code: 59059 /59540
- ^{1} French Land Register data, which excludes lakes, ponds, glaciers > 1 km^{2} (0.386 sq mi or 247 acres) and river estuaries.

Beaumont-en-Cambrésis is a commune in the Nord department in northern France. In 1794 the Battle of Beaumont took place near Beaumont-en-Cambrésis as a part of the French Revolutionary Wars.

== Population ==
Historical population
Year	Pop.	±% p.a.
1968	626	—
1975	559	−1.60%
1982	518	−1.08%
1990	500	−0.44%
1999	422	−1.87%
2007	463	+1.17%
2012	469	+0.26%
2017	446	−1.00%
2023	458	+0.44%
Source: INSEE

== Heraldry ==
Arms of Beaumont-en-Cambrésis	The arms of Beaumont-en-Cambrésis are blazoned : De gueules au trois lions d'argent.

== See also ==
- Communes of the Nord department
