= Clary, Nord =

Clary
- Commune
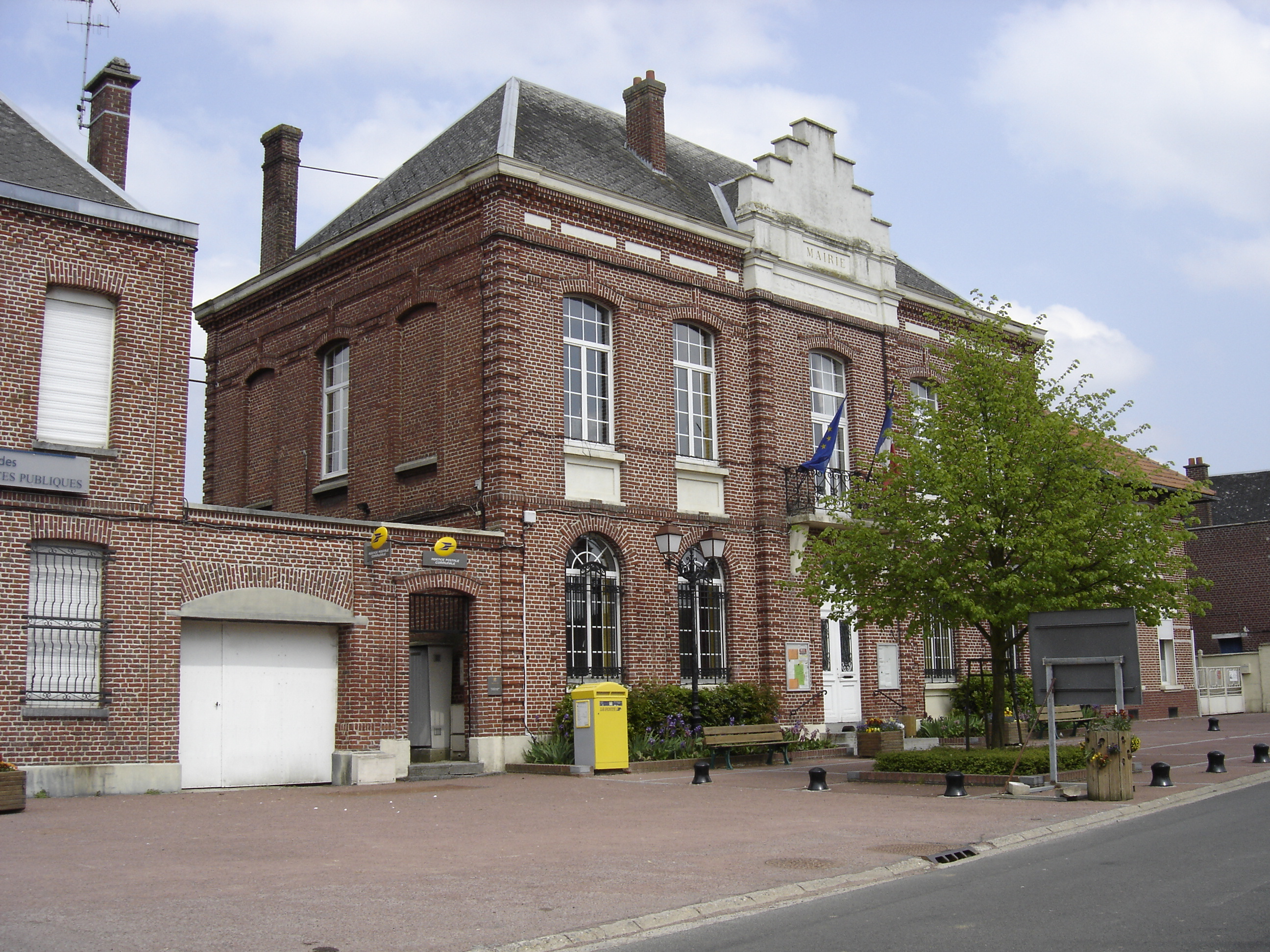
- The town hall in Clary

- Coat of arms
- Location of Clary
- Location within France Location within Hauts-de-France
- Coordinates: 50°04′41″N 3°24′03″E
- Country: France
- Region: Hauts-de-France
- Department: Nord
- Arrondissement: Cambrai
- Canton: Le Cateau-Cambrésis
- Intercommunality: CA Caudrésis–Catésis

Government
  - Mayor (2020–2026): Marie-Jo Déprez
- Area^{1}: 9.93 km^{2} (3.83 sq mi)
- Elevation: 123 m (404 ft)
- Highest elevation: 152 m (499 ft)
- Lowest elevation: 115 m (377 ft)
- Population (2023): 1,088
  - Density: 110/km^{2} (284/sq mi)
- Time zone: UTC+01:00 (CET)
  - Summer (DST): UTC+02:00 (CEST)
- INSEE/Postal code: 59149 /59225
- ^{1} French Land Register data, which excludes lakes, ponds, glaciers > 1 km^{2} (0.386 sq mi or 247 acres) and river estuaries.

Clary (French pronunciation: [klaʁi]) is a commune of the Nord department in northern France.

== Heraldry ==
Arms of Clary	The arms of Clary are blazoned : Azure, 7 bezants (3,3,1) and a chief Or. (Clary and Illies use the same arms.)

== World War I ==
The commune was liberated from German occupation by 5th/6th Battalion, Scottish Rifles, on 9 October 1918. The Place de la Mairie was renamed Place des Ecossais in their honour. When King George V visited Clary in November 1918, the same battalion was drawn up in the place to welcome him. Among those liberated was a British soldier who had been in hiding since the Battle of Le Cateau in August 1914.

== See also ==
- Communes of the Nord department
