= Haucourt-en-Cambrésis =

- Commune
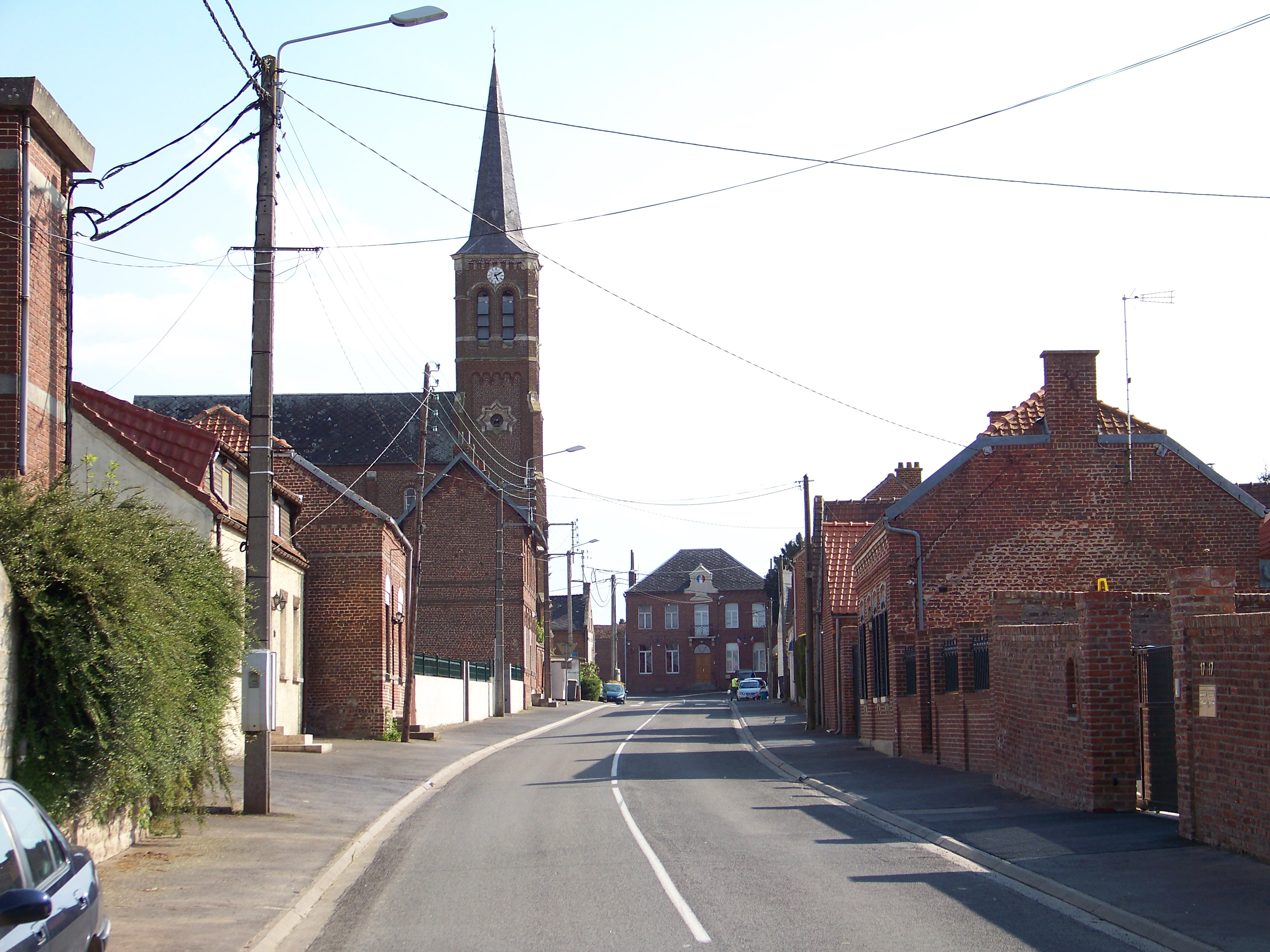
- The church and town hall in Haucourt-en-Cambrésis

- Coat of arms
- Location of Haucourt-en-Cambrésis
- Location within France Location within Hauts-de-France
- Coordinates: 50°06′18″N 3°20′33″E
- Country: France
- Region: Hauts-de-France
- Department: Nord
- Arrondissement: Cambrai
- Canton: Le Cateau-Cambrésis
- Intercommunality: CA Caudrésis–Catésis

Government
  - Mayor (2020–2026): Patrice Boniface
- Area^{1}: 3.57 km^{2} (1.38 sq mi)
- Elevation: 127 m (417 ft)
- Population (2023): 193
  - Density: 54.1/km^{2} (140/sq mi)
- Time zone: UTC+01:00 (CET)
  - Summer (DST): UTC+02:00 (CEST)
- INSEE/Postal code: 59287 /59191
- ^{1} French Land Register data, which excludes lakes, ponds, glaciers > 1 km^{2} (0.386 sq mi or 247 acres) and river estuaries.

Haucourt-en-Cambrésis is a commune in the Nord department in northern France.

== Heraldry ==
Arms of Haucourt-en-Cambrésis	The arms of Haucourt-en-Cambrésis are blazoned : Argent billetty, a lion gules. (Bazenville, Haucourt-en-Cambrésis, Honnecourt-sur-Escaut and Sailly-lez-Cambrai use the same arms.)

== See also ==
- Communes of the Nord department
