= Beauvois-en-Cambrésis =

- Commune
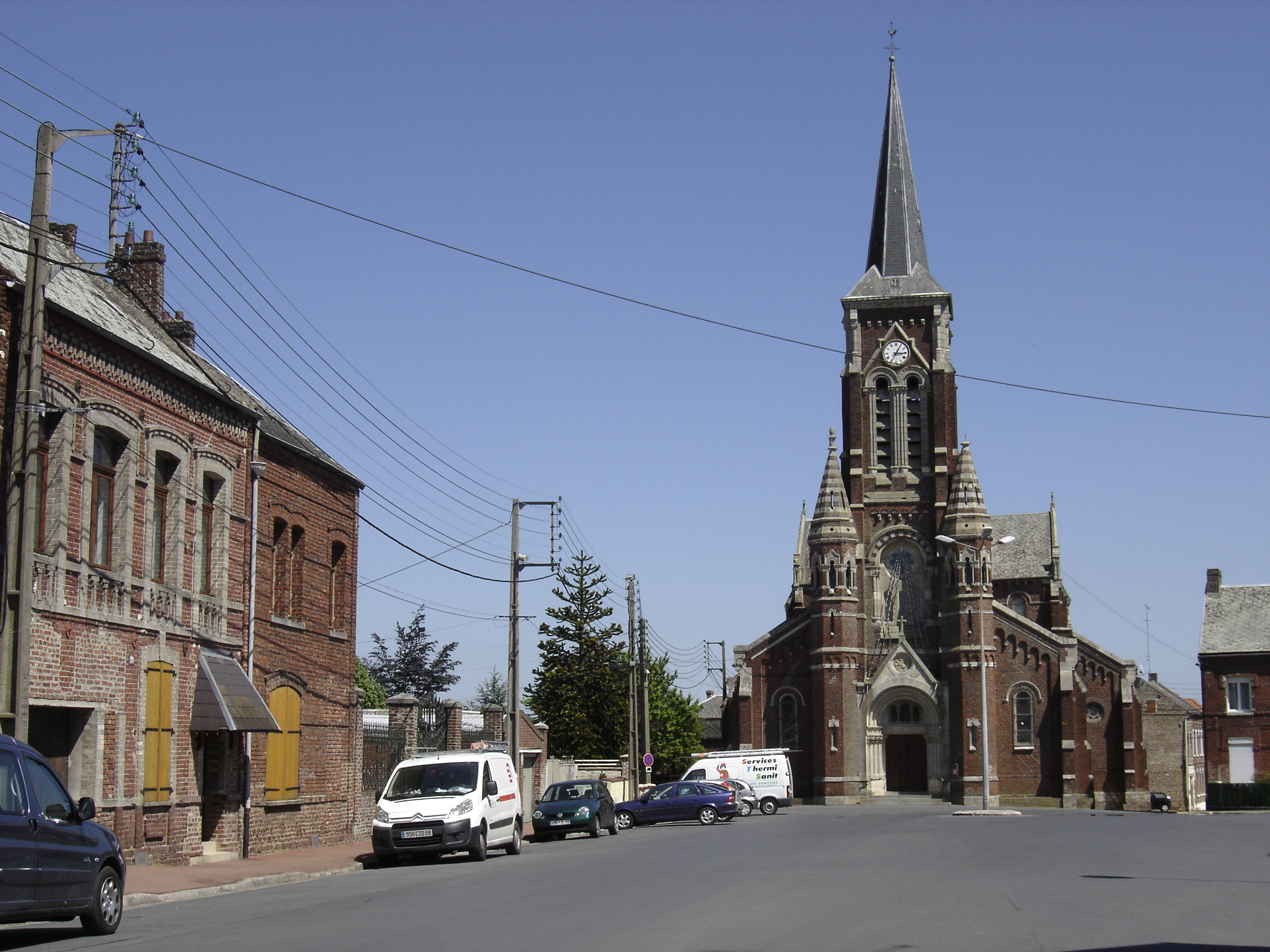
- The church in Beauvois-en-Cambrésis

- Coat of arms
- Location of Beauvois-en-Cambrésis
- Location within France Location within Hauts-de-France
- Coordinates: 50°08′19″N 3°23′01″E
- Country: France
- Region: Hauts-de-France
- Department: Nord
- Arrondissement: Cambrai
- Canton: Caudry
- Intercommunality: CA Caudrésis–Catésis

Government
  - Mayor (2020–2026): Yannick Herbet
- Area^{1}: 3.52 km^{2} (1.36 sq mi)
- Highest elevation: 121 m (397 ft)
- Lowest elevation: 86 m (282 ft)
- Population (2023): 1,933
  - Density: 549/km^{2} (1,420/sq mi)
- Time zone: UTC+01:00 (CET)
  - Summer (DST): UTC+02:00 (CEST)
- INSEE/Postal code: 59063 /59157
- ^{1} French Land Register data, which excludes lakes, ponds, glaciers > 1 km^{2} (0.386 sq mi or 247 acres) and river estuaries.

Beauvois-en-Cambrésis (before 1962: Beauvois) is a commune in the Nord department in northern France.

== Population ==
Historical population
Year	Pop.	±% p.a.
1968	2,286	—
1975	2,260	−0.16%
1982	2,258	−0.01%
1990	2,099	−0.91%
1999	1,994	−0.57%
2007	2,086	+0.57%
2012	2,153	+0.63%
2017	2,072	−0.76%
2023	1,933	−1.15%
Source: INSEE

== Heraldry ==
Arms of Beauvois-en-Cambrésis	The arms of Beauvois-en-Cambrésis are blazoned : Vert, a covered cup Or.

== See also ==
- Communes of the Nord department
