= Mazinghien =

- Commune
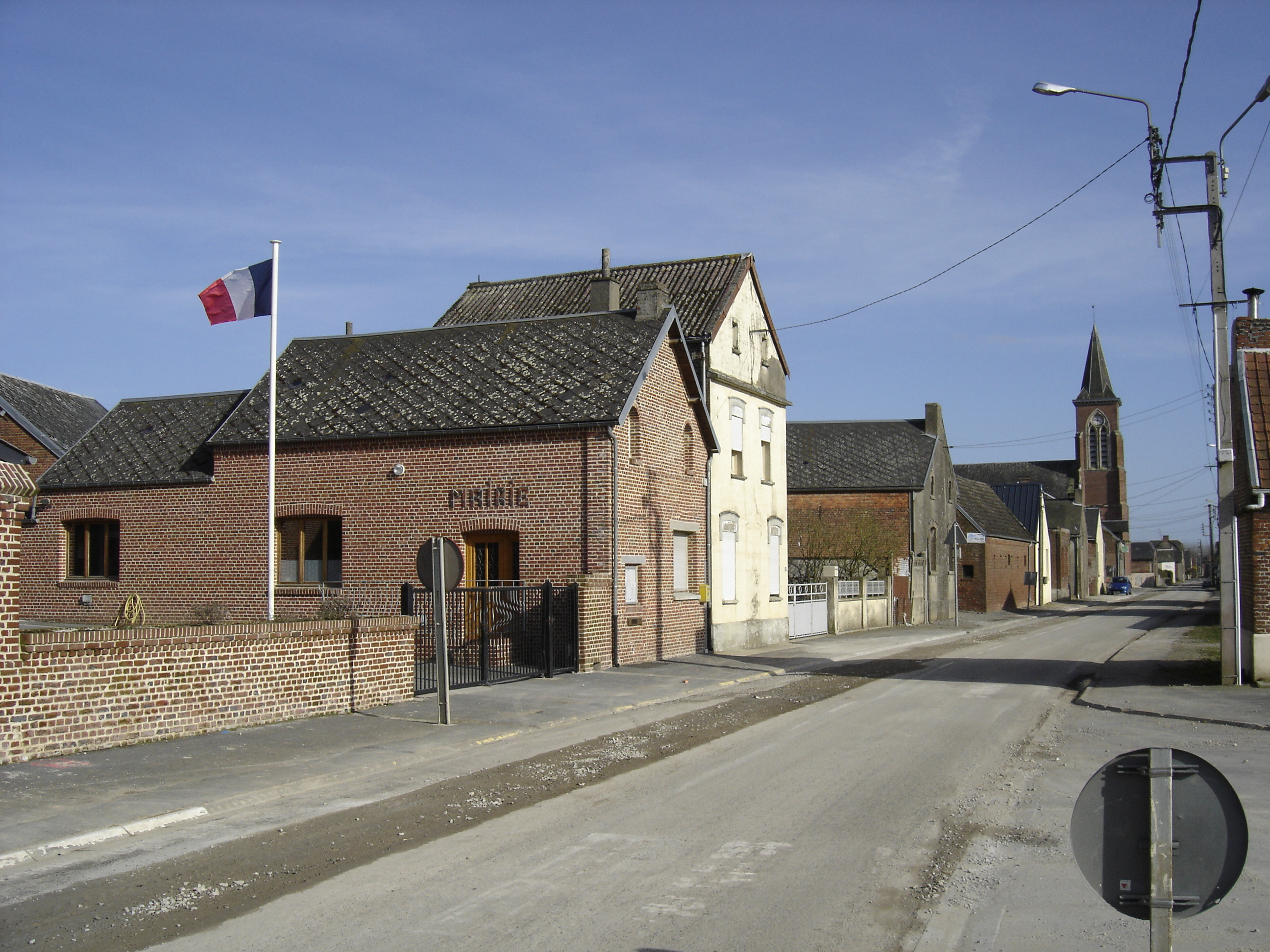
- The town hall in Mazinghien

- Coat of arms
- Location of Mazinghien
- Location within France Location within Hauts-de-France
- Coordinates: 50°03′01″N 3°36′16″E
- Country: France
- Region: Hauts-de-France
- Department: Nord
- Arrondissement: Cambrai
- Canton: Le Cateau-Cambrésis
- Intercommunality: CA Caudrésis–Catésis

Government
  - Mayor (2020–2026): Michel Hennequart
- Area^{1}: 9.01 km^{2} (3.48 sq mi)
- Highest elevation: 161 m (528 ft)
- Lowest elevation: 143 m (469 ft)
- Population (2023): 279
  - Density: 31.0/km^{2} (80.2/sq mi)
- Time zone: UTC+01:00 (CET)
  - Summer (DST): UTC+02:00 (CEST)
- INSEE/Postal code: 59395 /59360
- ^{1} French Land Register data, which excludes lakes, ponds, glaciers > 1 km^{2} (0.386 sq mi or 247 acres) and river estuaries.

Mazinghien (French pronunciation: [mazɛ̃ɡjɛ̃]) is a commune in the Nord department in northern France.

Map of Mazinghien

== Heraldry ==
Arms of Mazinghien	The arms of Mazinghien are blazoned : Vert, a titmouse proper perched on a branch, on a chief per pale 1: purpure, ??? and 2: Or, a lion sable, armed and langued gules. Note1: as drawn, this is a 'per fess' rather than field and chief. Note2: the bird shown is a great tit (Parus major)

== See also ==
- Communes of the Nord department
