= Banteux =

- Commune
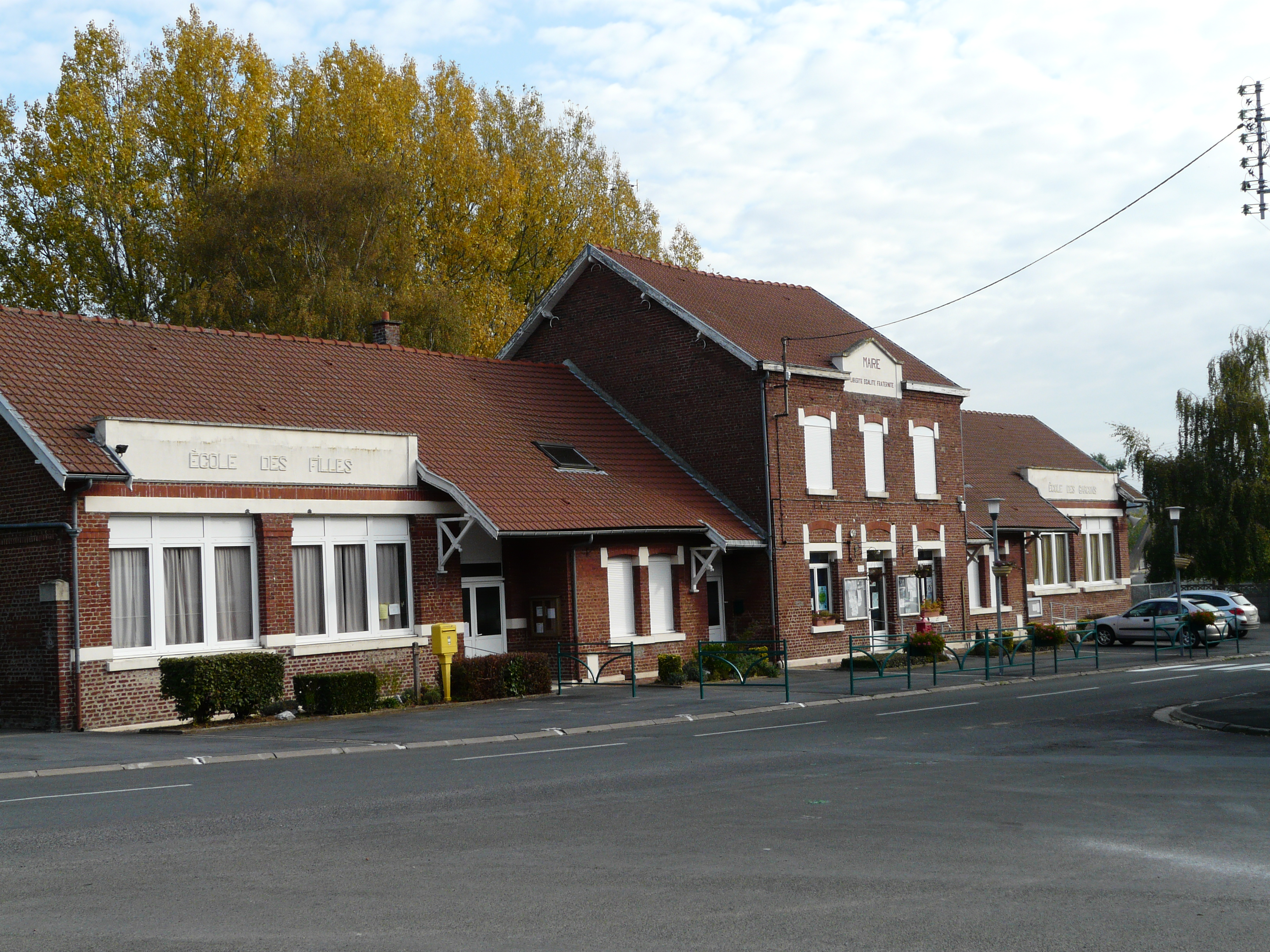
- The town hall in Banteux

- Coat of arms
- Location of Banteux
- Location within France Location within Hauts-de-France
- Coordinates: 50°03′44″N 3°11′58″E
- Country: France
- Region: Hauts-de-France
- Department: Nord
- Arrondissement: Cambrai
- Canton: Le Cateau-Cambrésis
- Intercommunality: CA Cambrai

Government
  - Mayor (2020–2026): Bernadette Godet
- Area^{1}: 6.18 km^{2} (2.39 sq mi)
- Elevation: 77 m (253 ft)
- Highest elevation: 133 m (436 ft)
- Lowest elevation: 71 m (233 ft)
- Population (2023): 339
  - Density: 54.9/km^{2} (142/sq mi)
- Time zone: UTC+01:00 (CET)
  - Summer (DST): UTC+02:00 (CEST)
- INSEE/Postal code: 59047 /59266
- ^{1} French Land Register data, which excludes lakes, ponds, glaciers > 1 km^{2} (0.386 sq mi or 247 acres) and river estuaries.

Banteux (French pronunciation: [bɑ̃tø]) is a commune in the Nord department in northern France.

== Population ==
Historical population
Year	Pop.	±% p.a.
1968	383	—
1975	361	−0.84%
1982	317	−1.84%
1990	311	−0.24%
1999	364	+1.76%
2007	332	−1.14%
2012	333	+0.06%
2017	344	+0.65%
2023	339	−0.24%
Source: INSEE

== Heraldry ==
Arms of Banteux	The arms of Banteux are blazoned : Or, a wolf passant azure.

== See also ==
- Communes of the Nord department
