= Ribécourt-la-Tour =

- Commune
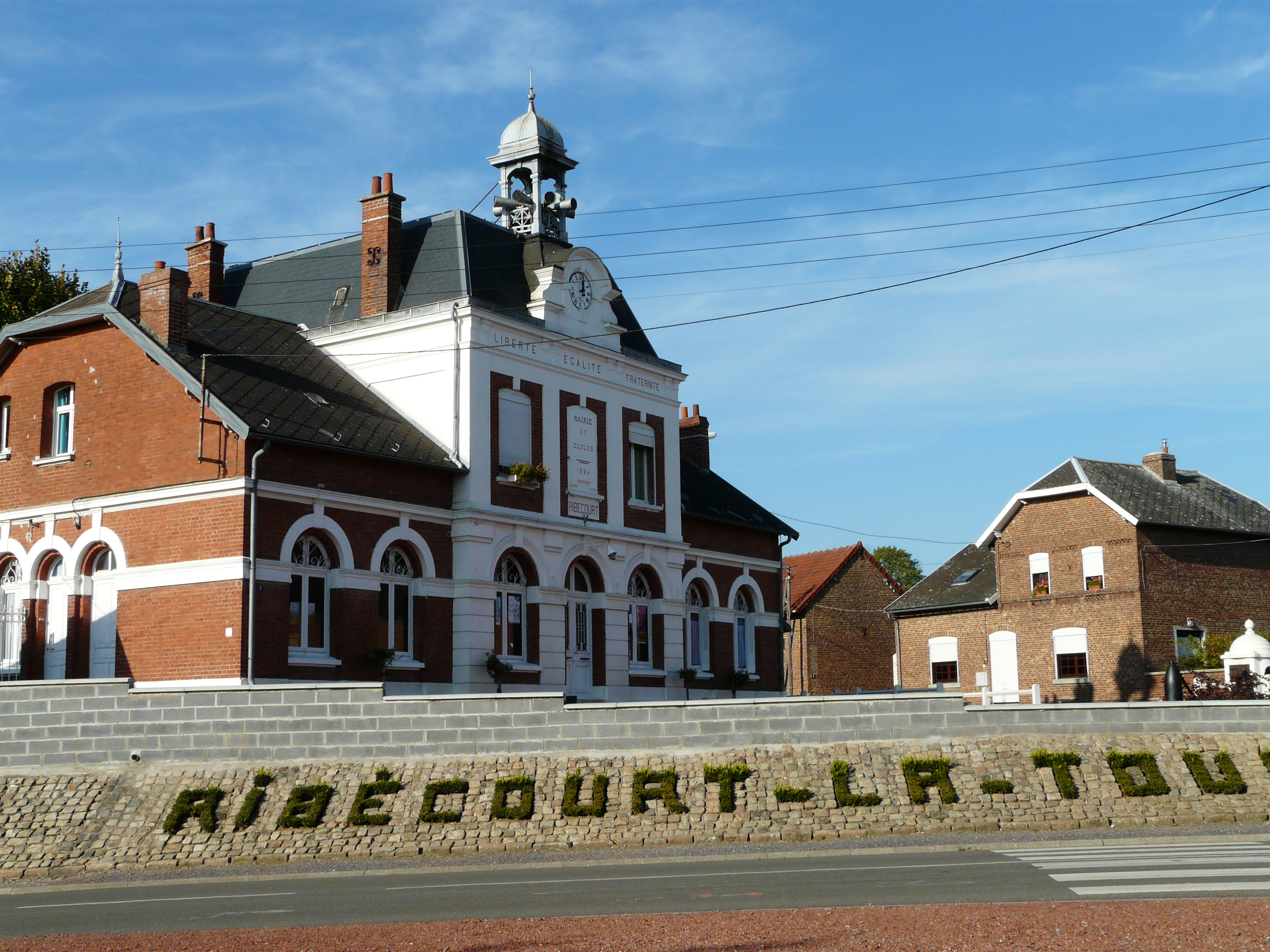
- The town hall in Ribécourt-la-Tour

- Coat of arms
- Location of Ribécourt-la-Tour
- Location within France Location within Hauts-de-France
- Coordinates: 50°06′40″N 3°07′48″E
- Country: France
- Region: Hauts-de-France
- Department: Nord
- Arrondissement: Cambrai
- Canton: Le Cateau-Cambrésis
- Intercommunality: CA Cambrai

Government
  - Mayor (2020–2026): Christelle Marques
- Area^{1}: 8.79 km^{2} (3.39 sq mi)
- Elevation: 74 m (243 ft)
- Highest elevation: 121 m (397 ft)
- Lowest elevation: 59 m (194 ft)
- Population (2023): 380
  - Density: 43/km^{2} (110/sq mi)
- Time zone: UTC+01:00 (CET)
  - Summer (DST): UTC+02:00 (CEST)
- INSEE/Postal code: 59500 /59159
- ^{1} French Land Register data, which excludes lakes, ponds, glaciers > 1 km^{2} (0.386 sq mi or 247 acres) and river estuaries.

Ribécourt-la-Tour (French pronunciation: [ʁibekuʁ la tuʁ]) is a commune in the Nord department in northern France.

== Heraldry ==
Arms of Ribécourt-la-Tour	The arms of Ribécourt-la-Tour are blazoned : Vert, a lion Or, armed and langued gules. (Ribécourt-la-Tour and Robersart use the same arms.)

== See also ==
- Communes of the Nord department

== Gallery ==
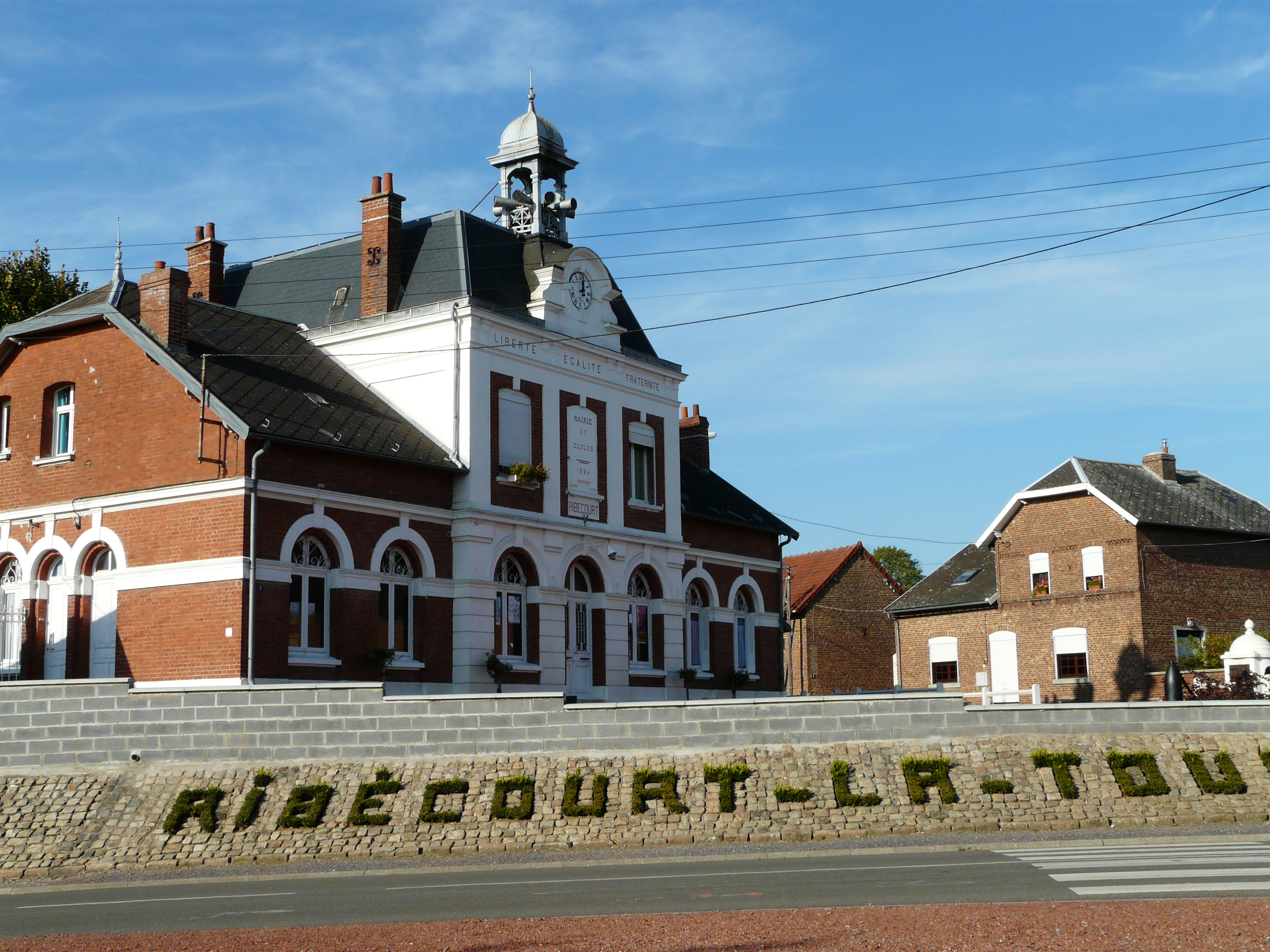
Ribécourt-la-Tour mairie

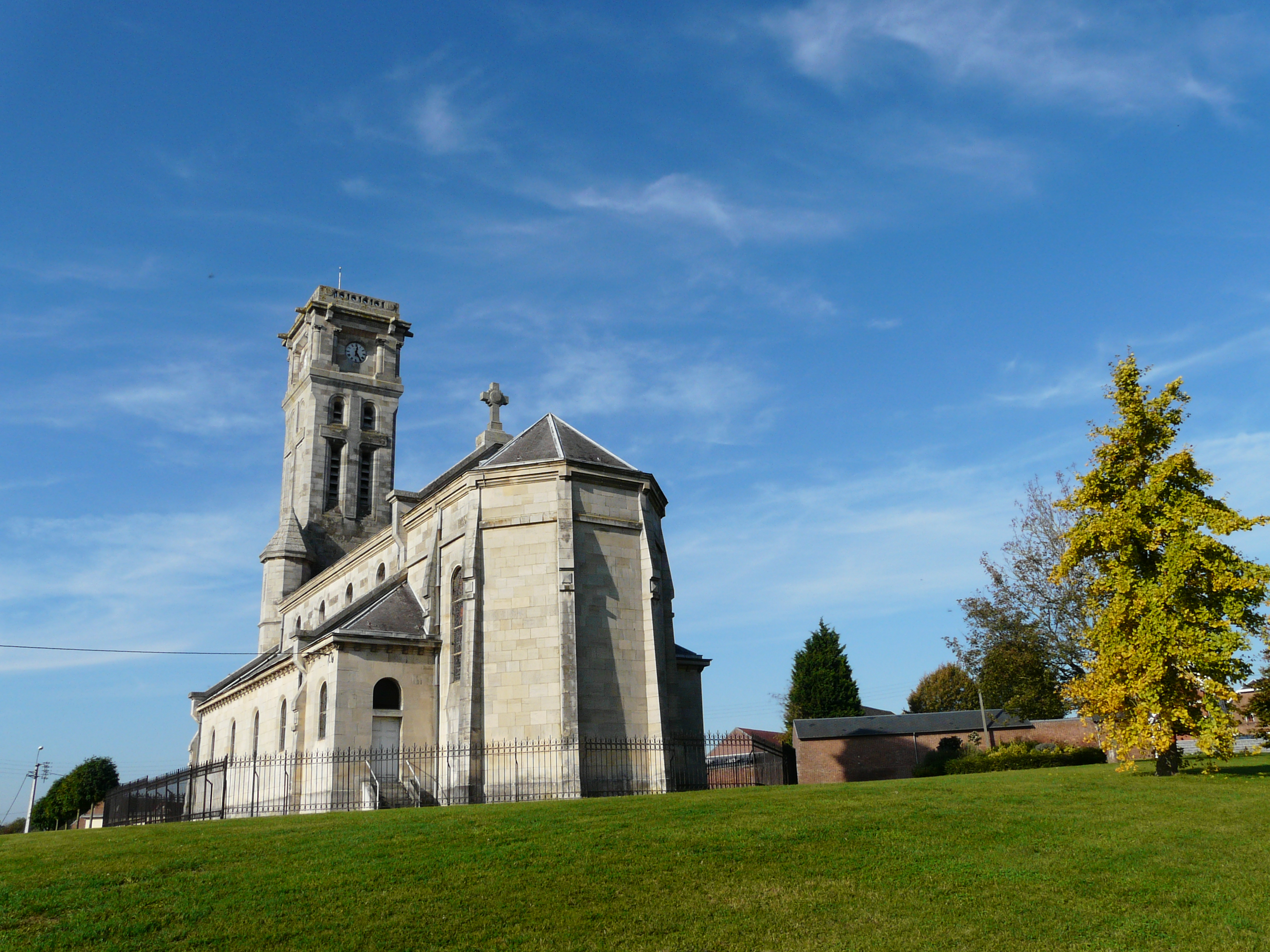
Ribécourt-la-Tour église
