= Ligny-en-Cambrésis =

- Commune
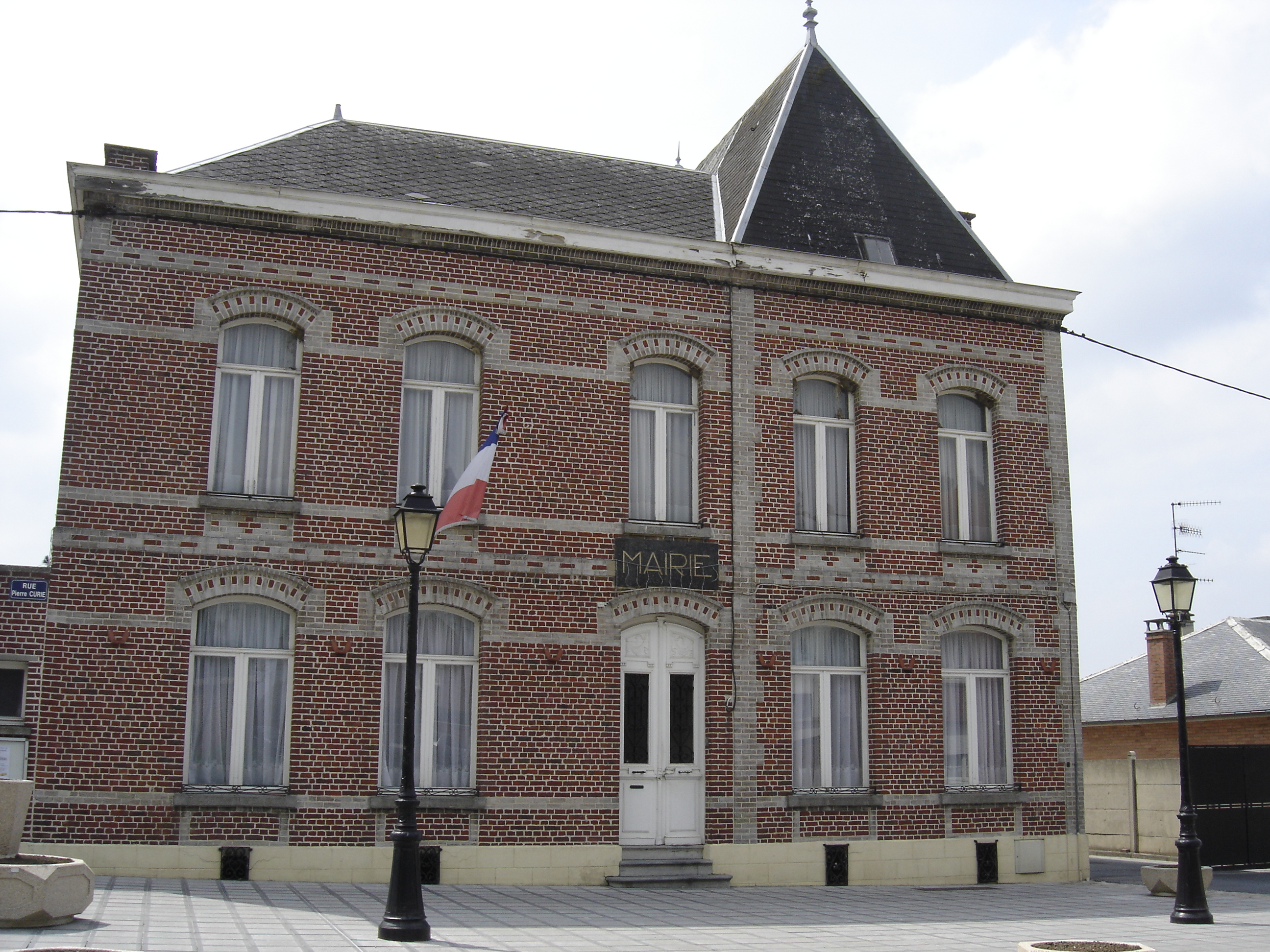
- The town hall in Ligny-en-Cambrésis

- Coat of arms
- Location of Ligny-en-Cambrésis
- Location within France Location within Hauts-de-France
- Coordinates: 50°06′02″N 3°22′48″E
- Country: France
- Region: Hauts-de-France
- Department: Nord
- Arrondissement: Cambrai
- Canton: Le Cateau-Cambrésis
- Intercommunality: CA Caudrésis–Catésis

Government
  - Mayor (2020–2026): Julien Léonard
- Area^{1}: 8.79 km^{2} (3.39 sq mi)
- Elevation: 127 m (417 ft)
- Highest elevation: 144 m (472 ft)
- Lowest elevation: 83 m (272 ft)
- Population (2023): 1,847
  - Density: 210/km^{2} (544/sq mi)
- Time zone: UTC+01:00 (CET)
  - Summer (DST): UTC+02:00 (CEST)
- INSEE/Postal code: 59349 /59191
- ^{1} French Land Register data, which excludes lakes, ponds, glaciers > 1 km^{2} (0.386 sq mi or 247 acres) and river estuaries.

Ligny-en-Cambrésis is a commune in the Nord department in northern France. The first Australian soldier to fall during the First World War, lieutenant William Malcolm Chisholm, who died of his wounds on 27 August 1914, is buried at Ligny-en-Cambrésis Communal Cemetery.

== Heraldry ==
Arms of Ligny-en-Cambrésis	The arms of Ligny-en-Cambrésis are blazoned : Azure, an inescutcheon between in orle 11 billets argent. (Ligny-en-Cambrésis, Masnières and Villers-au-Tertre use the same arms.)

== Population ==
Historical population
Year	Pop.	±% p.a.
1968	2,034	—
1975	1,914	−0.86%
1982	1,711	−1.59%
1990	1,652	−0.44%
1999	1,658	+0.04%
2007	1,691	+0.25%
2012	1,863	+1.96%
2017	1,894	+0.33%
2023	1,847	−0.42%
Source: INSEE

== See also ==
- Communes of the Nord department
