= Communauté d'agglomération du Caudrésis et du Catésis =

Caudrésis–Catésis
- Communauté d'agglomération
- Interactive map of Caudrésis–Catésis
- Coordinates: 50°07′N 03°27′E
- Country: France
- Region: Hauts-de-France
- Department: Nord
- No. of communes: {{{nbcomm}}}
- Established: 2011
- Area: 372.7 km^{2} (143.9 sq mi)
- Population (2019): 64,124
  - Density: 172.1/km^{2} (445.6/sq mi)
- Website: www.agglo-cambrai.fr

Communauté d'agglomération du Caudrésis et du Catésis is the communauté d'agglomération, an intercommunal structure, centred on the towns of Caudry and Le Cateau-Cambrésis. It is located in the Nord department, in the Hauts-de-France region, northern France. Created in 2011, its seat is in Beauvois-en-Cambrésis. Its area is 372.7 km^{2}. Its population was 64,124 in 2019, of which 14,121 in Caudry.

== Composition ==
The communauté d'agglomération consists of the following 46 communes:

1. Avesnes-les-Aubert
2. Bazuel
3. Beaumont-en-Cambrésis
4. Beauvois-en-Cambrésis
5. Bertry
6. Béthencourt
7. Bévillers
8. Boussières-en-Cambrésis
9. Briastre
10. Busigny
11. Carnières
12. Le Cateau-Cambrésis
13. Catillon-sur-Sambre
14. Cattenières
15. Caudry
16. Caullery
17. Clary
18. Dehéries
19. Élincourt
20. Estourmel
21. Fontaine-au-Pire
22. La Groise
23. Haucourt-en-Cambrésis
24. Honnechy
25. Inchy
26. Ligny-en-Cambrésis
27. Malincourt
28. Maretz
29. Maurois
30. Mazinghien
31. Montay
32. Montigny-en-Cambrésis
33. Neuvilly
34. Ors
35. Pommereuil
36. Quiévy
37. Rejet-de-Beaulieu
38. Reumont
39. Saint-Aubert
40. Saint-Benin
41. Saint-Hilaire-lez-Cambrai
42. Saint-Souplet
43. Saint-Vaast-en-Cambrésis
44. Troisvilles
45. Villers-Outréaux
46. Walincourt-Selvigny
