= Canton of Le Cateau-Cambrésis =

Coordinates: 50.10°N 3.54°E

The canton of Le Cateau-Cambrésis is an administrative division of the Nord department, northern France. Its borders were modified at the French canton reorganisation which came into effect in March 2015. Its seat is in Le Cateau-Cambrésis.

It consists of the following communes:

1. Awoingt
2. Banteux
3. Bantouzelle
4. Bazuel
5. Beaumont-en-Cambrésis
6. Bertry
7. Briastre
8. Busigny
9. Cantaing-sur-Escaut
10. Le Cateau-Cambrésis
11. Catillon-sur-Sambre
12. Cattenières
13. Caullery
14. Clary
15. Crèvecœur-sur-l'Escaut
16. Dehéries
17. Élincourt
18. Esnes
19. Flesquières
20. Fontaine-au-Pire
21. Gonnelieu
22. Gouzeaucourt
23. La Groise
24. Haucourt-en-Cambrésis
25. Honnechy
26. Honnecourt-sur-Escaut
27. Inchy
28. Lesdain
29. Ligny-en-Cambrésis
30. Malincourt
31. Marcoing
32. Maretz
33. Masnières
34. Maurois
35. Mazinghien
36. Montay
37. Montigny-en-Cambrésis
38. Neuvilly
39. Niergnies
40. Noyelles-sur-Escaut
41. Ors
42. Pommereuil
43. Rejet-de-Beaulieu
44. Reumont
45. Ribécourt-la-Tour
46. Les Rues-des-Vignes
47. Rumilly-en-Cambrésis
48. Saint-Benin
49. Saint-Souplet
50. Séranvillers-Forenville
51. Troisvilles
52. Villers-Guislain
53. Villers-Outréaux
54. Villers-Plouich
55. Walincourt-Selvigny
56. Wambaix
