= La Groise =

- Commune
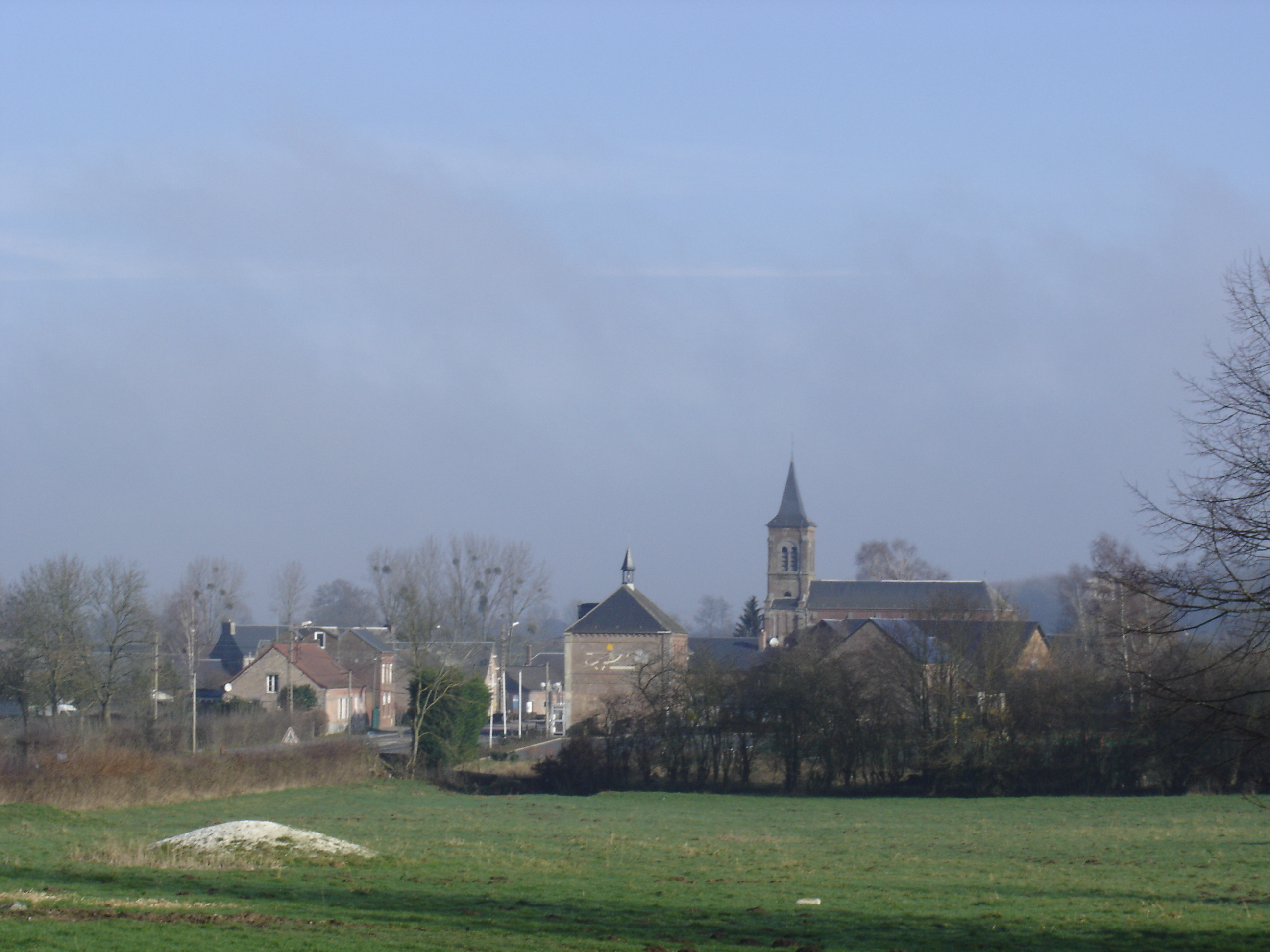
- A general view of La Groise

- Coat of arms
- Location of La Groise
- Location within France Location within Hauts-de-France
- Coordinates: 50°04′33″N 3°40′57″E
- Country: France
- Region: Hauts-de-France
- Department: Nord
- Arrondissement: Cambrai
- Canton: Le Cateau-Cambrésis
- Intercommunality: CA Caudrésis–Catésis

Government
  - Mayor (2020–2026): Aymeric Demade
- Area^{1}: 9.38 km^{2} (3.62 sq mi)
- Highest elevation: 186 m (610 ft)
- Lowest elevation: 138 m (453 ft)
- Population (2023): 464
  - Density: 49.5/km^{2} (128/sq mi)
- Time zone: UTC+01:00 (CET)
  - Summer (DST): UTC+02:00 (CEST)
- INSEE/Postal code: 59274 /59360
- ^{1} French Land Register data, which excludes lakes, ponds, glaciers > 1 km^{2} (0.386 sq mi or 247 acres) and river estuaries.

La Groise (French pronunciation: [la ɡʁwaz]) is a commune in the Nord department in northern France.

== Heraldry ==
| Arms of La Groise | The arms of La Groise are blazoned : Per bend sinister gules and azure, a sword bendwise sinister Or with a guard argent charged with a cross gules, between a tower argent pierced and charged with the letter 'K' on the door sable, and a wyvern Or langued gules. |

== See also ==
- Communes of the Nord department
