= Montay =

- Commune
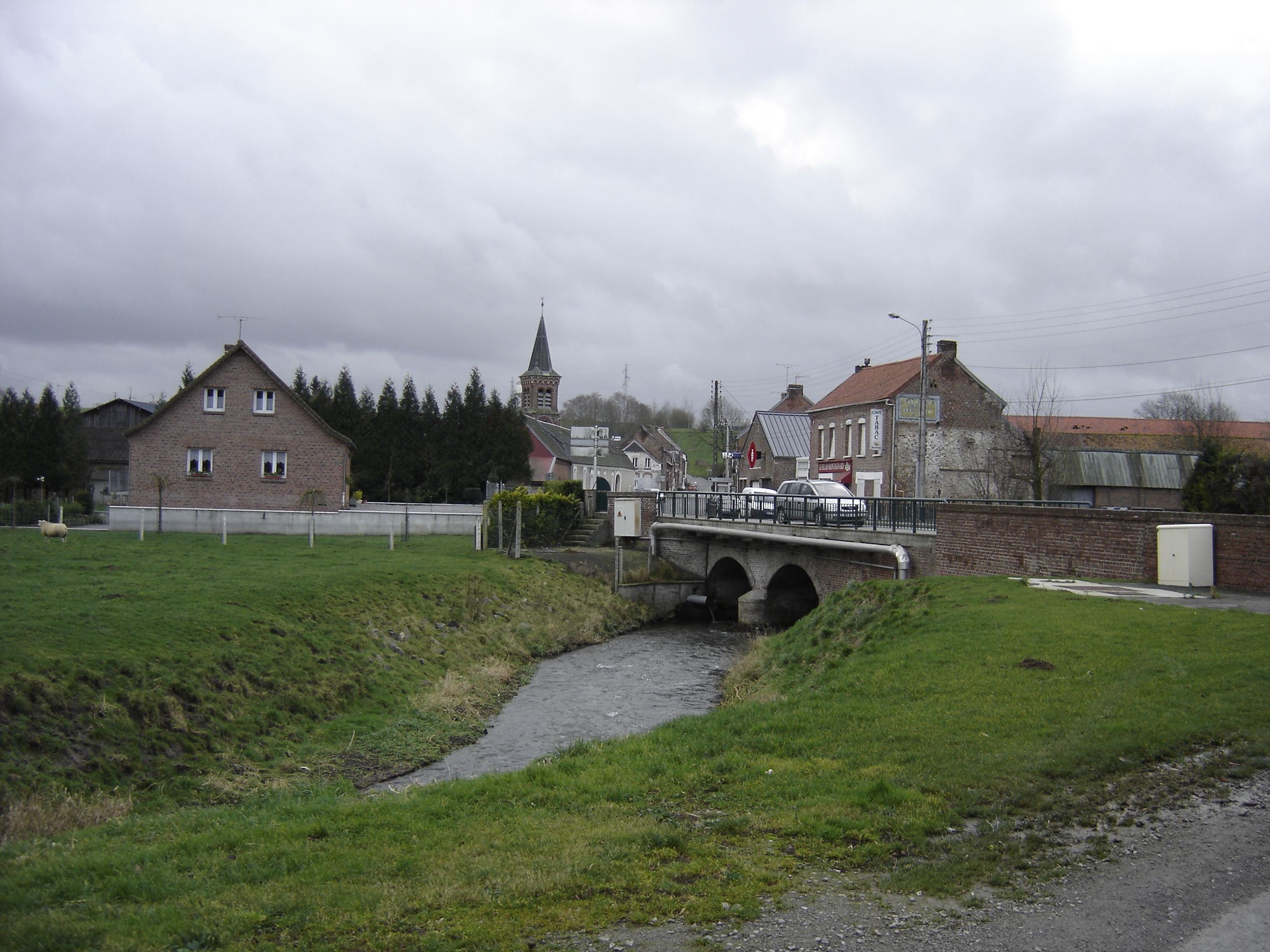
- Center of the village and the Selle River

- Coat of arms
- Location of Montay
- Location within France Location within Hauts-de-France
- Coordinates: 50°07′11″N 3°32′29″E
- Country: France
- Region: Hauts-de-France
- Department: Nord
- Arrondissement: Cambrai
- Canton: Le Cateau-Cambrésis
- Intercommunality: CA Caudrésis–Catésis

Government
  - Mayor (2020–2026): Laurence Ribes
- Area^{1}: 5.51 km^{2} (2.13 sq mi)
- Highest elevation: 146 m (479 ft)
- Lowest elevation: 77 m (253 ft)
- Population (2023): 276
  - Density: 50.1/km^{2} (130/sq mi)
- Time zone: UTC+01:00 (CET)
  - Summer (DST): UTC+02:00 (CEST)
- INSEE/Postal code: 59412 /59360
- ^{1} French Land Register data, which excludes lakes, ponds, glaciers > 1 km^{2} (0.386 sq mi or 247 acres) and river estuaries.

Montay (French pronunciation: [mɔ̃tɛ]) is a commune in the Nord department in northern France. Montay has a population of 276 people (2019).

== Heraldry ==
Arms of Montay	The arms of Montay are blazoned : Checky argent and azure, a label of 6 points gules.

== Monuments ==
- Eglise Saint-Jean-Baptiste
- Old Mill

== See also ==
- Communes of the Nord department
