= Reumont =

- Commune
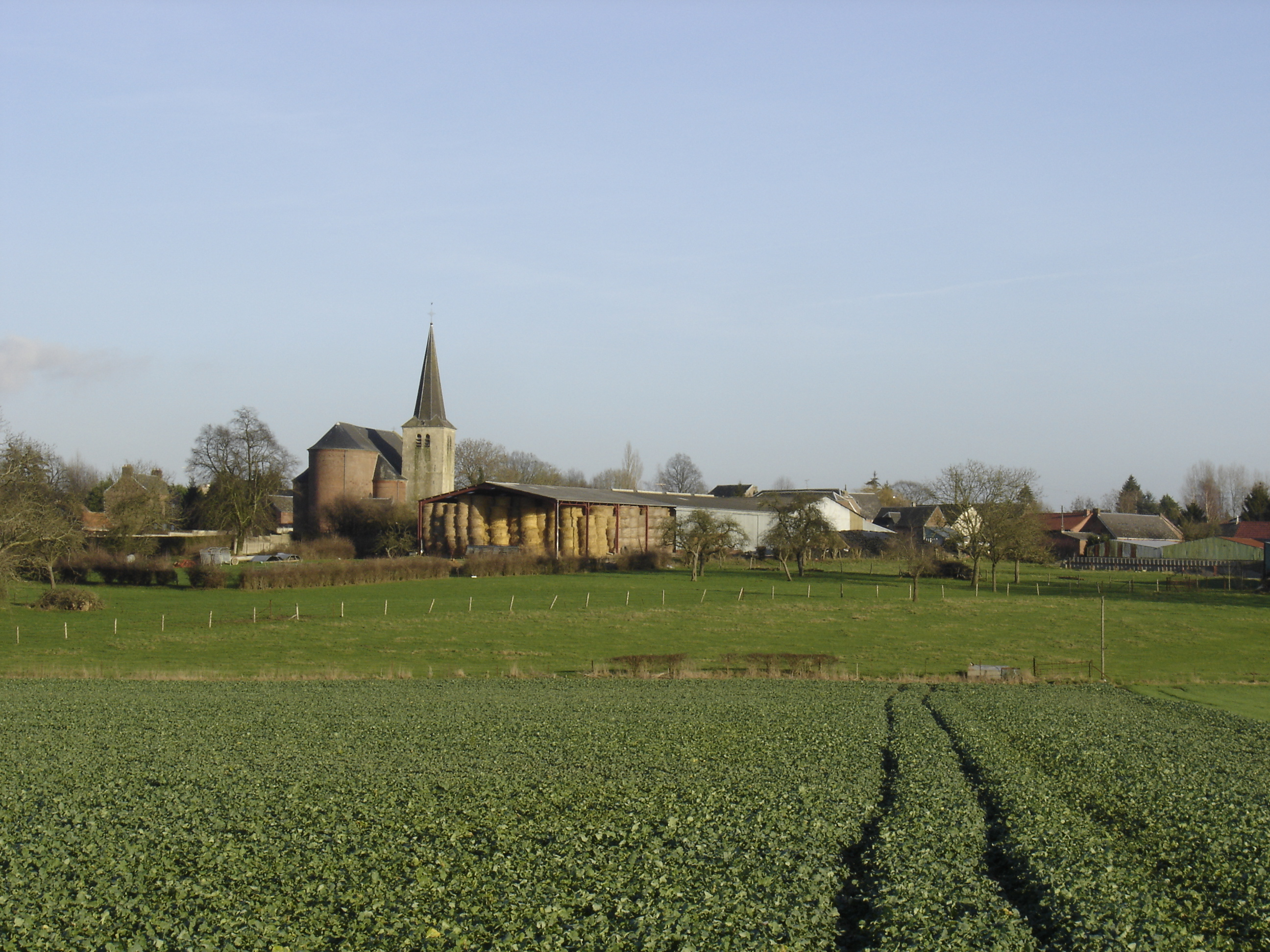
- A general view of Reumont

- Coat of arms
- Location of Reumont
- Location within France Location within Hauts-de-France
- Coordinates: 50°05′00″N 3°29′02″E
- Country: France
- Region: Hauts-de-France
- Department: Nord
- Arrondissement: Cambrai
- Canton: Le Cateau-Cambrésis
- Intercommunality: CA Caudrésis–Catésis

Government
  - Mayor (2020–2026): Jean-Pierre Richez
- Area^{1}: 2.77 km^{2} (1.07 sq mi)
- Highest elevation: 149 m (489 ft)
- Lowest elevation: 121 m (397 ft)
- Population (2023): 337
  - Density: 122/km^{2} (315/sq mi)
- Time zone: UTC+01:00 (CET)
  - Summer (DST): UTC+02:00 (CEST)
- INSEE/Postal code: 59498 /59980
- ^{1} French Land Register data, which excludes lakes, ponds, glaciers > 1 km^{2} (0.386 sq mi or 247 acres) and river estuaries.

Reumont (French pronunciation: [ʁømɔ̃]) is a commune in the Nord department in northern France.

== Heraldry ==
Arms of Reumont	The arms of Reumont are blazoned : Quarterly 1&4: Or, an eagle displayed sable; 2&3: Or, a chevron gules; overall an inescutcheon argent, a crown of 2 olive branches vert.

== Population ==
Historical population
Year	Pop.	±% p.a.
1968	374	—
1975	339	−1.39%
1982	339	+0.00%
1990	331	−0.30%
1999	317	−0.48%
2007	358	+1.53%
2012	394	+1.93%
2017	363	−1.63%
2023	337	−1.23%
Source: INSEE

== See also ==
- Communes of the Nord department
