= Pommereuil =

Commune in Nord, northern France

- Commune
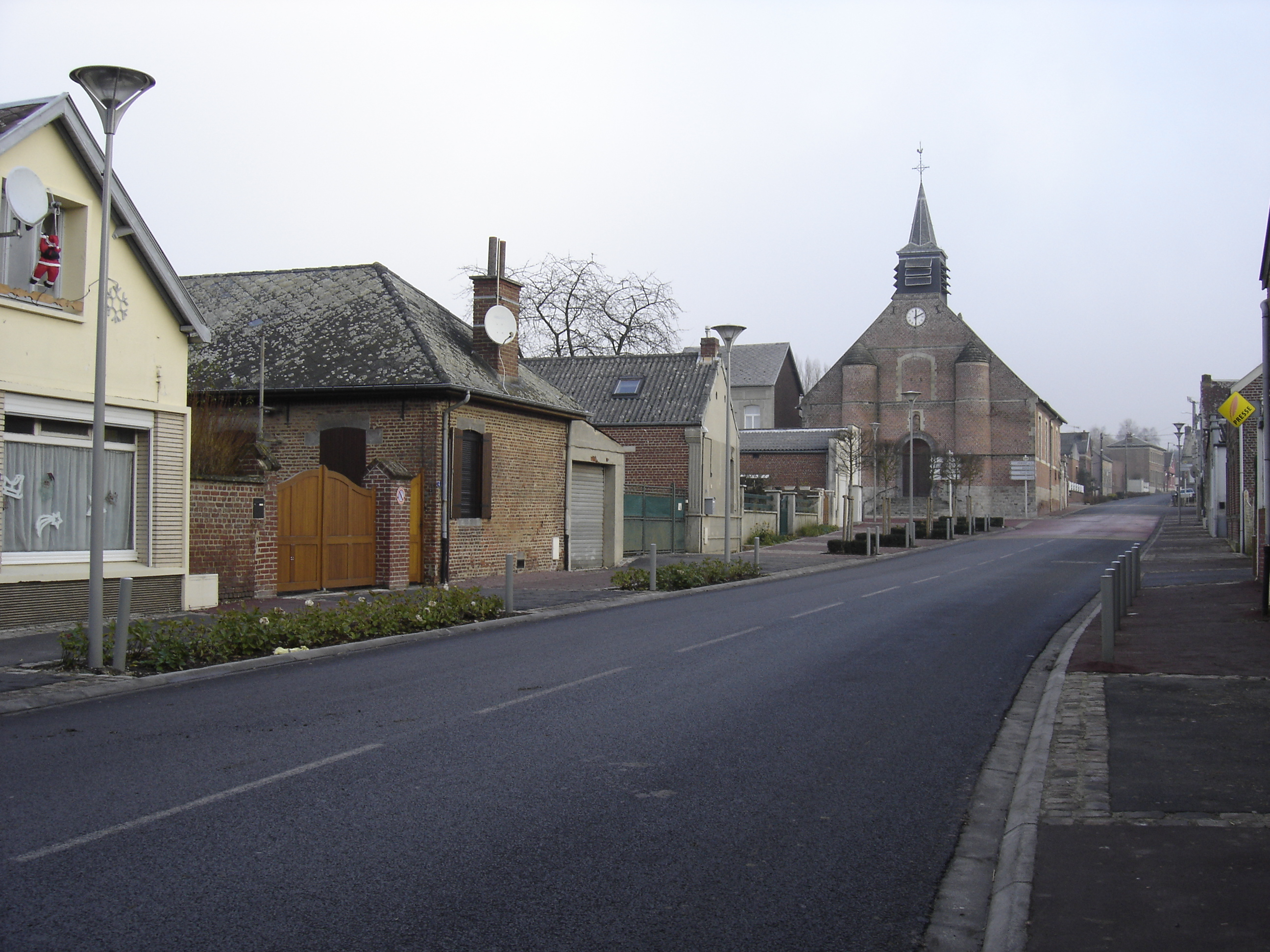
- A view within Pommereuil

- Coat of arms
- Location of Pommereuil
- Location within France Location within Hauts-de-France
- Coordinates: 50°06′46″N 3°35′48″E
- Country: France
- Region: Hauts-de-France
- Department: Nord
- Arrondissement: Cambrai
- Canton: Le Cateau-Cambrésis
- Intercommunality: CA Caudrésis–Catésis

Government
  - Mayor (2020–2026): Pascal Paquet
- Area^{1}: 6.45 km^{2} (2.49 sq mi)
- Highest elevation: 153 m (502 ft)
- Lowest elevation: 91 m (299 ft)
- Population (2023): 765
  - Density: 119/km^{2} (307/sq mi)
- Time zone: UTC+01:00 (CET)
  - Summer (DST): UTC+02:00 (CEST)
- INSEE/Postal code: 59465 /59360
- ^{1} French Land Register data, which excludes lakes, ponds, glaciers > 1 km^{2} (0.386 sq mi or 247 acres) and river estuaries.

Pommereuil (French pronunciation: [pɔmʁœj]; also: Le Pommereuil) is a commune in the Nord department in northern France.

== History ==
The village and surrounding woods (Bois l'Évêque) were heavily damaged by a tornado on 24 June 1967, a relatively rare occurrence in France.

=== Heraldry ===
Arms of Pommereuil	The arms of Pommereuil are blazoned : Argent, a cross moline sable. (Challes-les-Eaux, Montalembert, Neuvilly and Pommereuil use the same arms.)

== Monuments ==
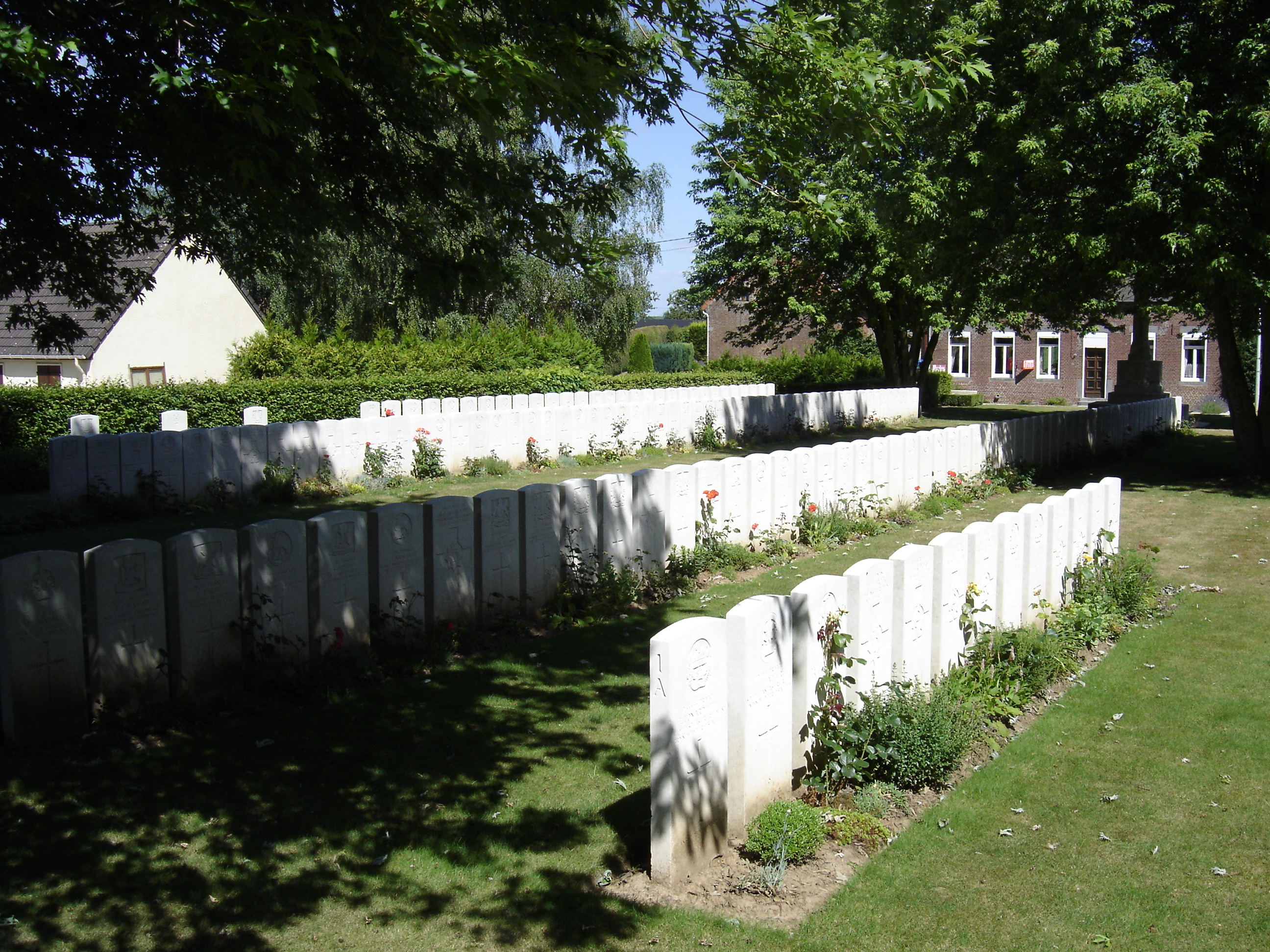
Pommereuil British Cemetery

- The church, Église Saint-Michel, was built during the 17th Century and has a fortified tower.

== See also ==
- Communes of the Nord department
