= Rejet-de-Beaulieu =

- Commune
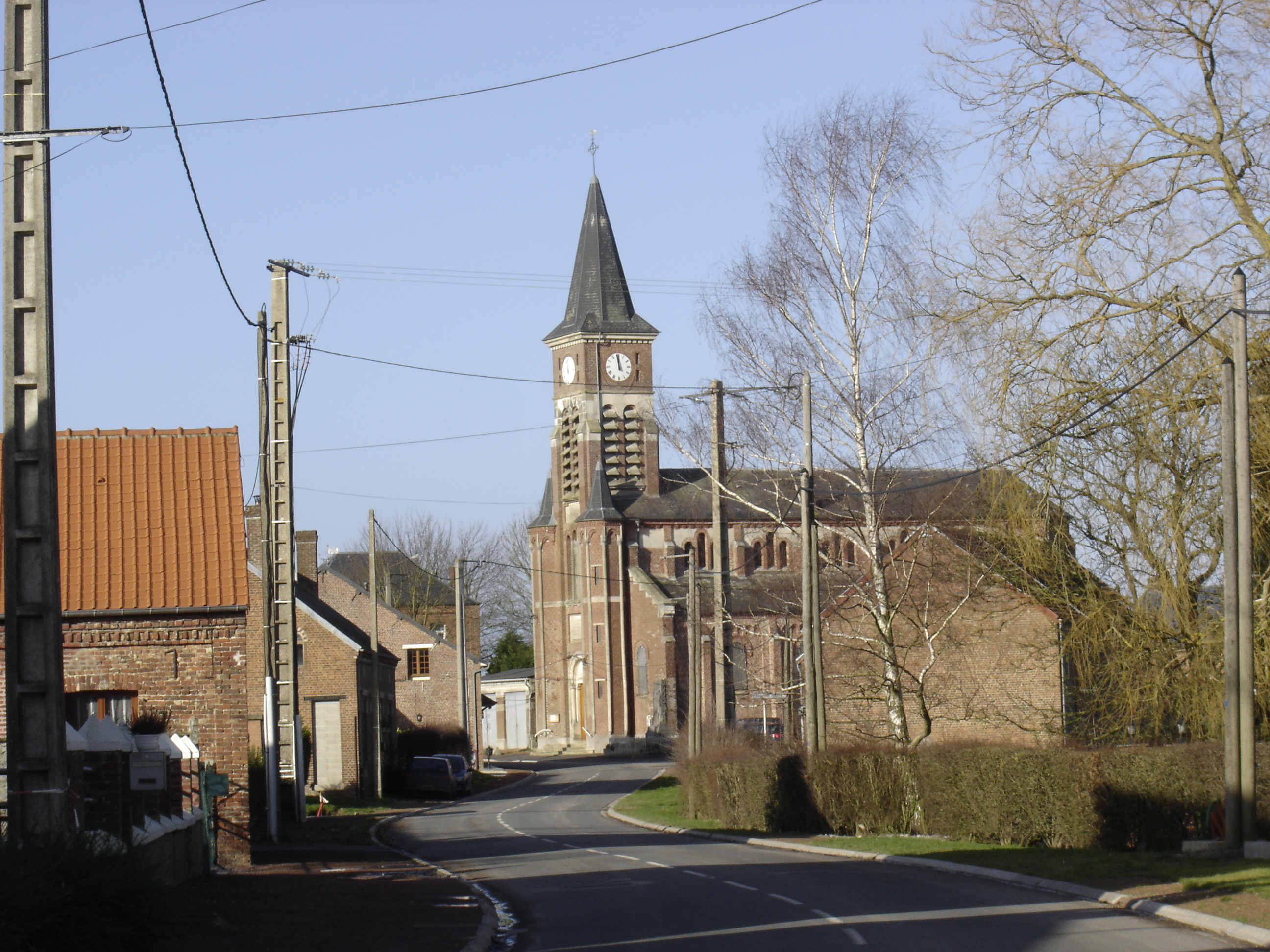
- The church in Rejet-de-Beaulieu

- Coat of arms
- Location of Rejet-de-Beaulieu
- Location within France Location within Hauts-de-France
- Coordinates: 50°02′35″N 3°37′57″E
- Country: France
- Region: Hauts-de-France
- Department: Nord
- Arrondissement: Cambrai
- Canton: Le Cateau-Cambrésis
- Intercommunality: CA Caudrésis–Catésis

Government
  - Mayor (2020–2026): Augustine Noirmain
- Area^{1}: 6.35 km^{2} (2.45 sq mi)
- Highest elevation: 158 m (518 ft)
- Lowest elevation: 134 m (440 ft)
- Population (2023): 241
  - Density: 38.0/km^{2} (98.3/sq mi)
- Time zone: UTC+01:00 (CET)
  - Summer (DST): UTC+02:00 (CEST)
- INSEE/Postal code: 59496 /59360
- ^{1} French Land Register data, which excludes lakes, ponds, glaciers > 1 km^{2} (0.386 sq mi or 247 acres) and river estuaries.

Rejet-de-Beaulieu (French pronunciation: [ʁəʒɛ də boljø]) is a commune in the Nord department in northern France.

== Heraldry ==
Arms of Rejet-de-Beaulieu	The arms of Rejet-de-Beaulieu are blazoned : Vert, a tower argent, charged on the door with a hunting horn Or.

== See also ==
- Communes of the Nord department
