= Busigny =

- Commune
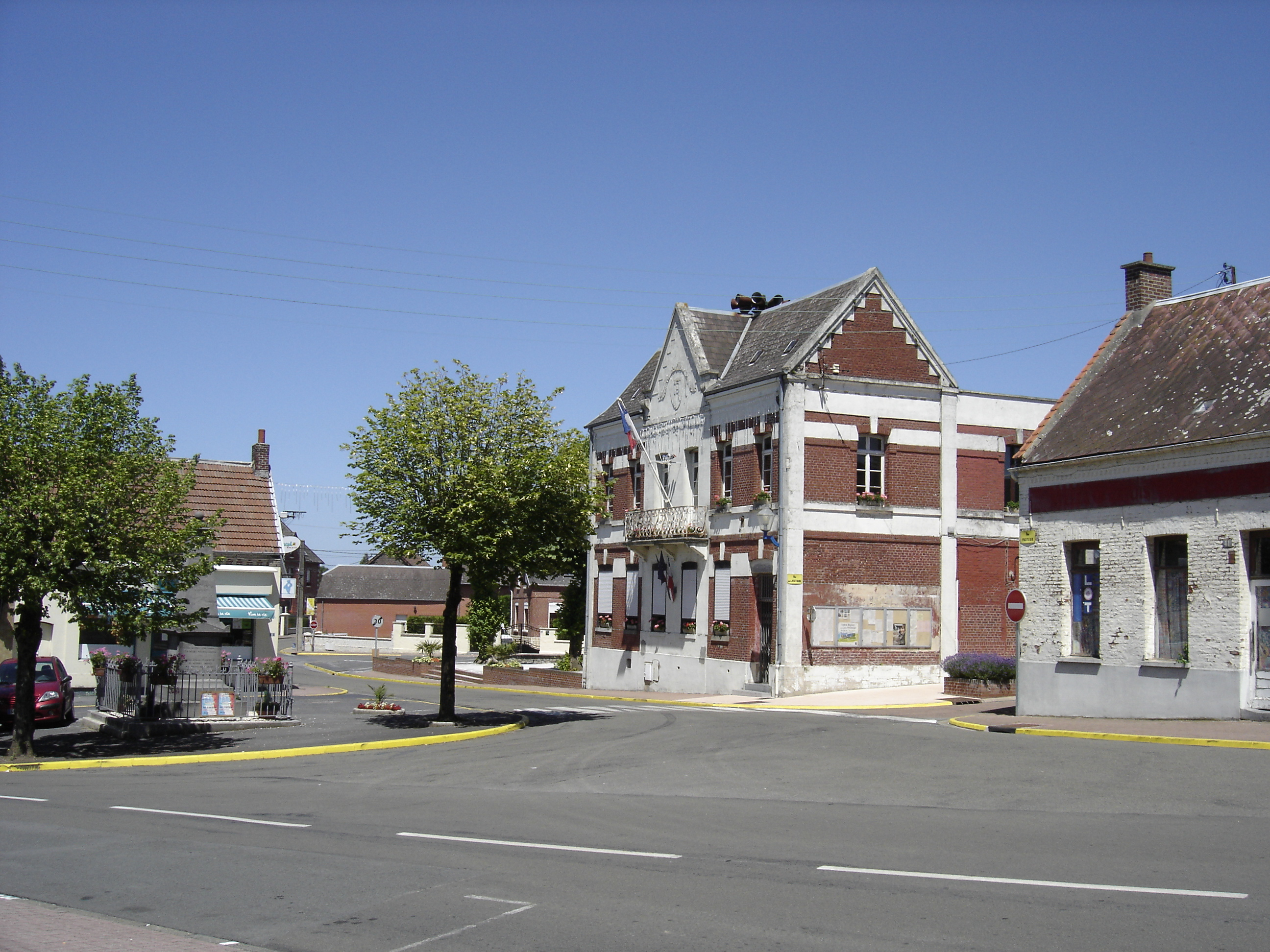
- The town hall in Busigny

- Coat of arms
- Location of Busigny
- Location within France Location within Hauts-de-France
- Coordinates: 50°02′03″N 3°28′05″E
- Country: France
- Region: Hauts-de-France
- Department: Nord
- Arrondissement: Cambrai
- Canton: Le Cateau-Cambrésis
- Intercommunality: CA Caudrésis–Catésis

Government
  - Mayor (2020–2026): Didier Maréchalle
- Area^{1}: 16.47 km^{2} (6.36 sq mi)
- Elevation: 168 m (551 ft)
- Highest elevation: 180 m (590 ft)
- Lowest elevation: 129 m (423 ft)
- Population (2023): 2,435
  - Density: 147.8/km^{2} (382.9/sq mi)
- Time zone: UTC+01:00 (CET)
  - Summer (DST): UTC+02:00 (CEST)
- INSEE/Postal code: 59118 /59137
- ^{1} French Land Register data, which excludes lakes, ponds, glaciers > 1 km^{2} (0.386 sq mi or 247 acres) and river estuaries.

Busigny (French pronunciation: [byziɲi]) is a commune in the Nord department in northern France. Busigny station has rail connections to Douai, Paris, Lille, Maubeuge and Saint-Quentin.

== Population ==
Historical population

| Year | Pop. | ±% p.a. |
|---|---|---|
| 1793 | 1,465 | — |
| 1821 | 1,936 | +1.00% |
| 1846 | 2,572 | +1.14% |
| 1872 | 3,540 | +1.24% |
| 1901 | 2,753 | −0.86% |
| 1926 | 3,548 | +1.02% |
| 1946 | 3,007 | −0.82% |
| 1962 | 3,139 | +0.27% |
| 1968 | 3,120 | −0.10% |

| Year | Pop. | ±% p.a. |
|---|---|---|
| 1975 | 3,046 | −0.34% |
| 1982 | 2,636 | −2.04% |
| 1990 | 2,385 | −1.24% |
| 1999 | 2,429 | +0.20% |
| 2007 | 2,532 | +0.52% |
| 2012 | 2,557 | +0.20% |
| 2017 | 2,482 | −0.59% |
| 2023 | 2,435 | −0.32% |

Source: EHESS and INSEE (1968-2023)

== Heraldry ==
| Arms of Busigny | The arms of Busigny are blazoned : Or, 3 chevrons gules and in base a 'Croix de guerre 1939-1945' proper impaled with Or, 3 fesses gules billety Or |

== See also ==
- Communes of the Nord department
