= Fontaine-au-Pire =

- Commune
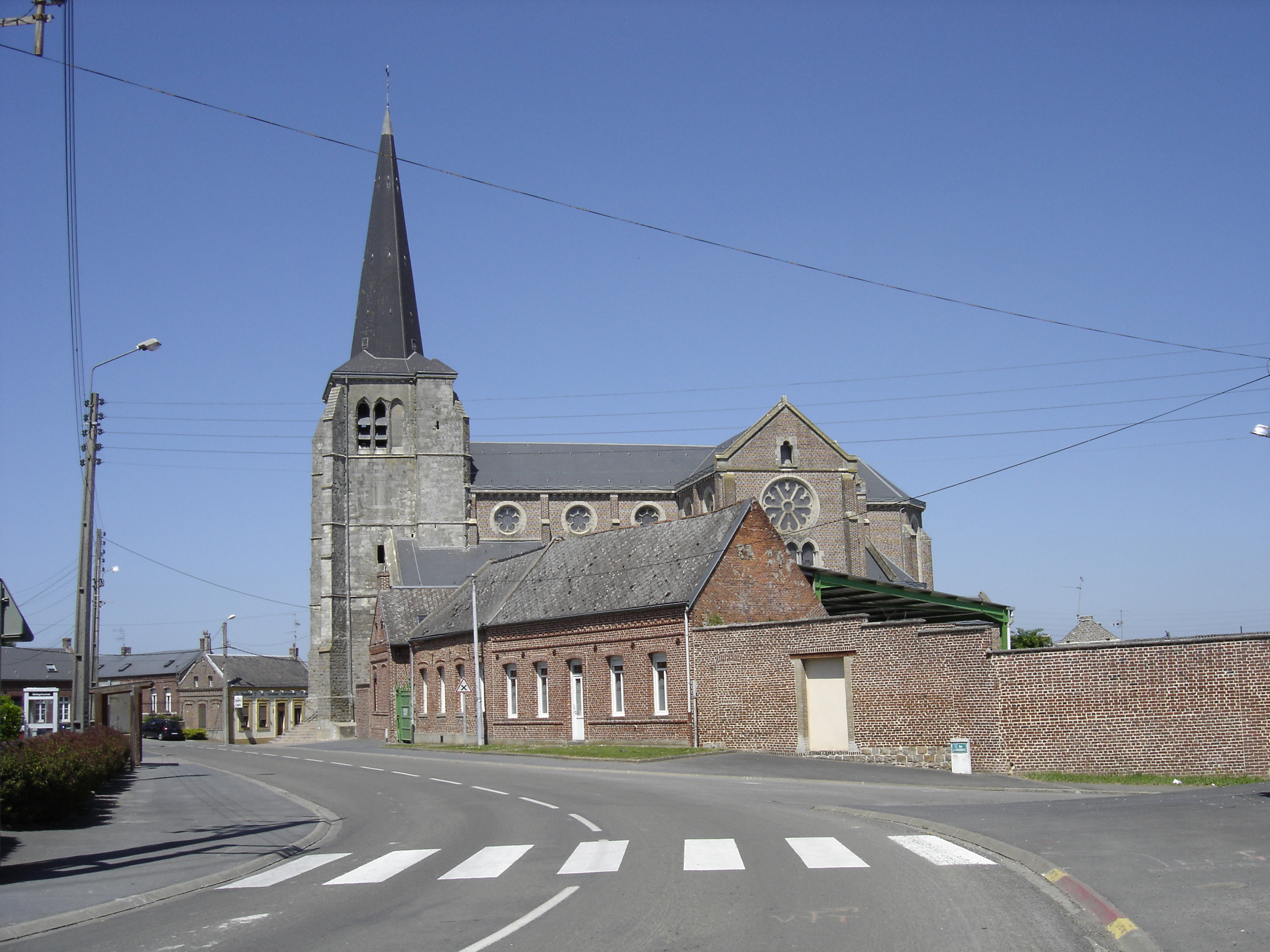
- The church in Fontaine-au-Pire

- Coat of arms
- Location of Fontaine-au-Pire
- Location within France Location within Hauts-de-France
- Coordinates: 50°07′50″N 3°22′32″E
- Country: France
- Region: Hauts-de-France
- Department: Nord
- Arrondissement: Cambrai
- Canton: Le Cateau-Cambrésis
- Intercommunality: CA Caudrésis–Catésis

Government
  - Mayor (2020–2026): Jean-Claude Gérard
- Area^{1}: 7.57 km^{2} (2.92 sq mi)
- Elevation: 126 m (413 ft)
- Highest elevation: 129 m (423 ft)
- Lowest elevation: 87 m (285 ft)
- Population (2023): 1,214
  - Density: 160/km^{2} (415/sq mi)
- Time zone: UTC+01:00 (CET)
  - Summer (DST): UTC+02:00 (CEST)
- INSEE/Postal code: 59243 /59157
- ^{1} French Land Register data, which excludes lakes, ponds, glaciers > 1 km^{2} (0.386 sq mi or 247 acres) and river estuaries.

Fontaine-au-Pire (French pronunciation: [fɔ̃tɛn o piʁ]) is a commune in the Nord department in northern France.

== Heraldry ==
Arms of Fontaine-au-Pire	The arms of Fontaine-au-Pire are blazoned : Azure, a mullet, and in chief a label of 3 points Or. (Abancourt and Fontaine-au-Pire use the same arms.)

== See also ==
- Communes of the Nord department
