= Dehéries =

- Commune
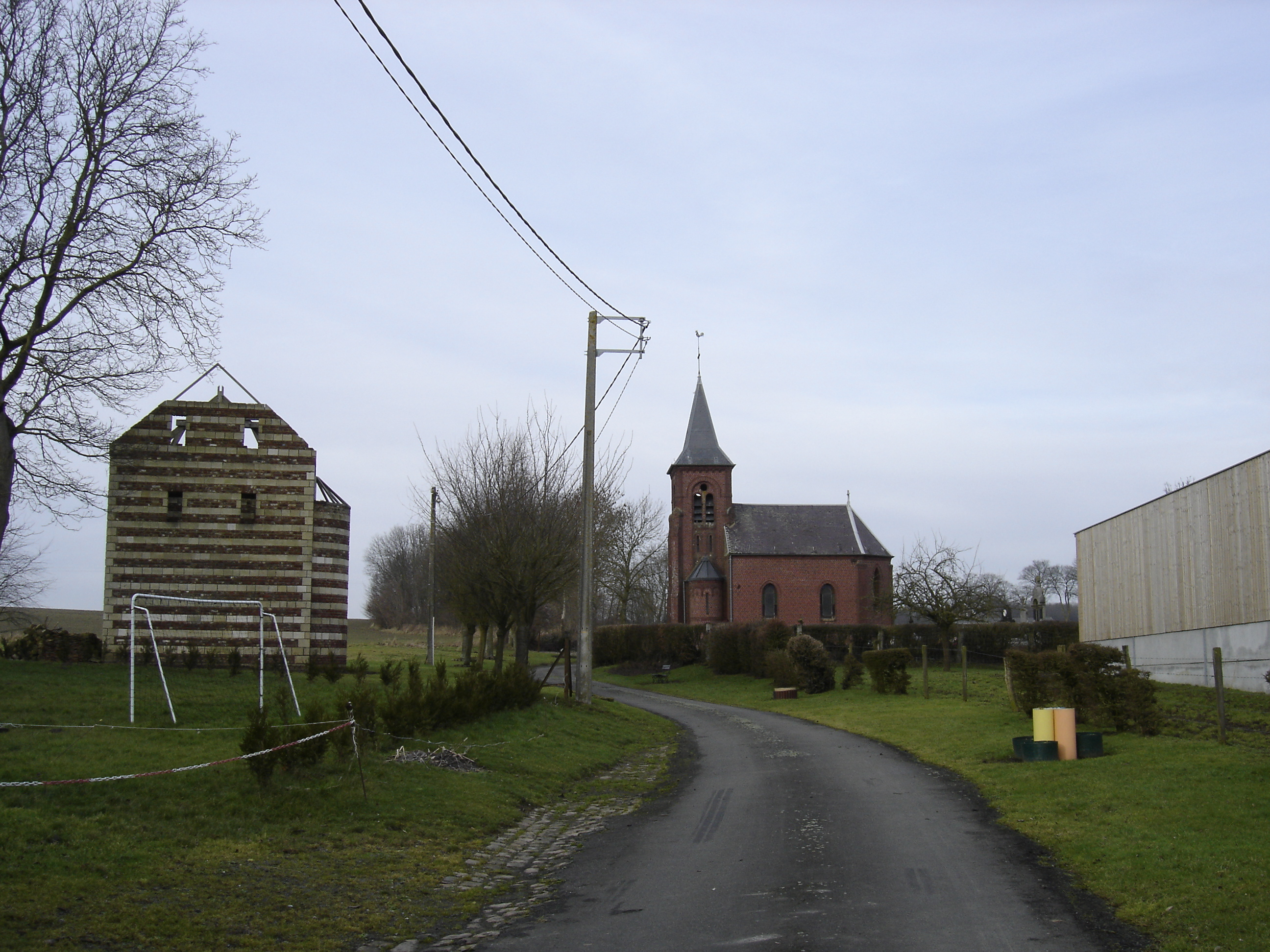
- The church in Dehéries

- Coat of arms
- Location of Dehéries
- Location within France Location within Hauts-de-France
- Coordinates: 50°03′09″N 3°20′29″E
- Country: France
- Region: Hauts-de-France
- Department: Nord
- Arrondissement: Cambrai
- Canton: Le Cateau-Cambrésis
- Intercommunality: CA Caudrésis–Catésis

Government
  - Mayor (2020–2026): Gilles Pelletier
- Area^{1}: 1.87 km^{2} (0.72 sq mi)
- Elevation: 150 m (490 ft)
- Highest elevation: 151 m (495 ft)
- Lowest elevation: 125 m (410 ft)
- Population (2023): 43
  - Density: 23/km^{2} (60/sq mi)
- Time zone: UTC+01:00 (CET)
  - Summer (DST): UTC+02:00 (CEST)
- INSEE/Postal code: 59171 /59127
- ^{1} French Land Register data, which excludes lakes, ponds, glaciers > 1 km^{2} (0.386 sq mi or 247 acres) and river estuaries.

Dehéries (French pronunciation: [də.eʁi]) is a commune in the Nord department in northern France.

== Heraldry ==
Arms of Dehéries	The arms of Dehéries are blazoned : Gules, a mullet of 5 points argent.

== See also ==
- Communes of the Nord department
