= Élincourt =

- Commune
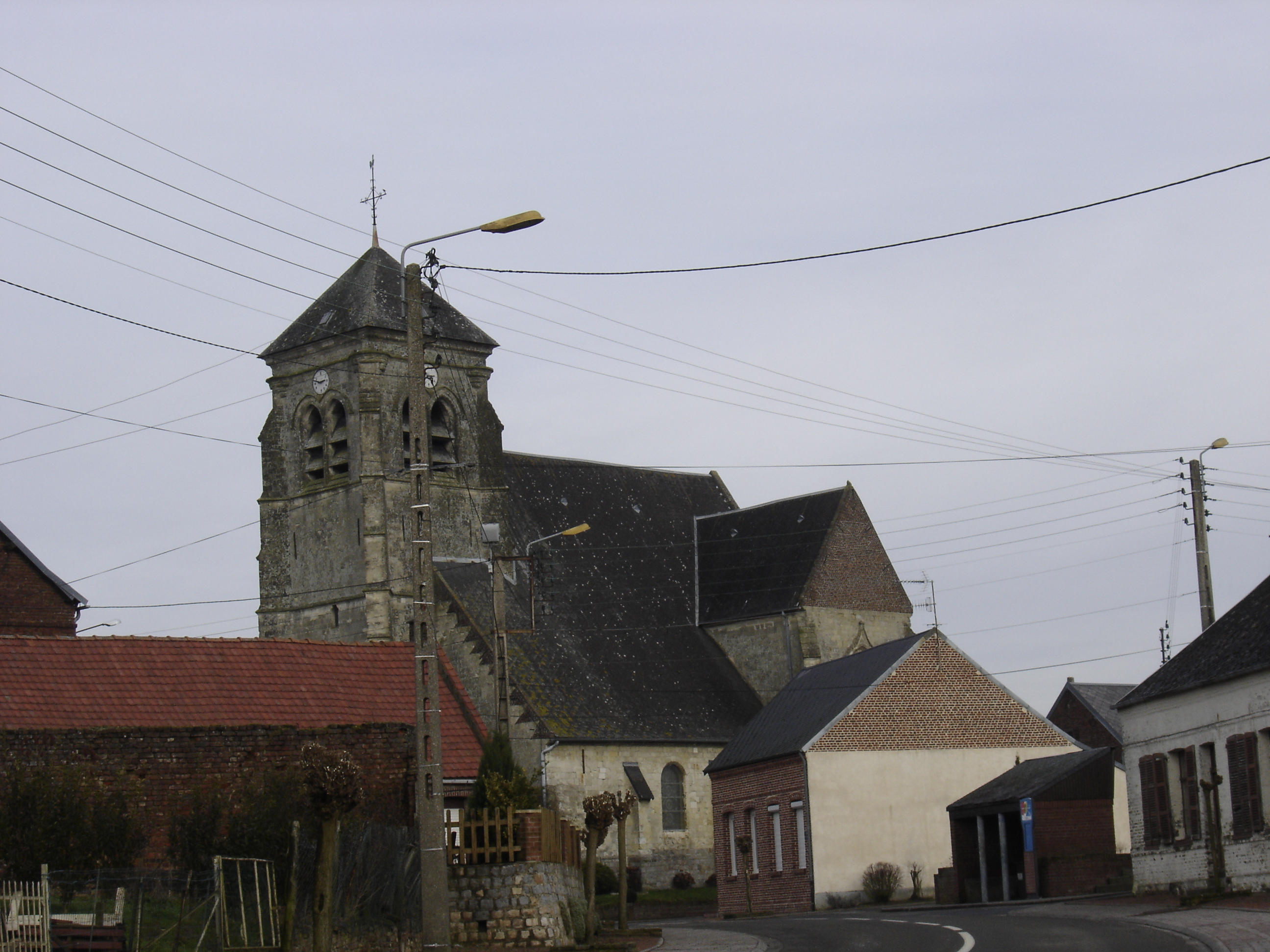
- The church in Élincourt

- Coat of arms
- Location of Élincourt
- Location within France Location within Hauts-de-France
- Coordinates: 50°02′42″N 3°22′21″E
- Country: France
- Region: Hauts-de-France
- Department: Nord
- Arrondissement: Cambrai
- Canton: Le Cateau-Cambrésis
- Intercommunality: CA Caudrésis - Catésis

Government
  - Mayor (2020–2026): Pierre Laude
- Area^{1}: 8.41 km^{2} (3.25 sq mi)
- Highest elevation: 153 m (502 ft)
- Lowest elevation: 129 m (423 ft)
- Population (2023): 606
  - Density: 72.1/km^{2} (187/sq mi)
- Time zone: UTC+01:00 (CET)
  - Summer (DST): UTC+02:00 (CEST)
- INSEE/Postal code: 59191 /59127
- ^{1} French Land Register data, which excludes lakes, ponds, glaciers > 1 km^{2} (0.386 sq mi or 247 acres) and river estuaries.

Élincourt (French pronunciation: [elɛ̃kuʁ]) is a commune in the Nord department in northern France.

== Heraldry ==
Arms of Élincourt	The arms of Élincourt are blazoned : Gules, a canton ermine.

== See also ==
- Communes of the Nord department
