= Honnecourt-sur-Escaut =

- Commune
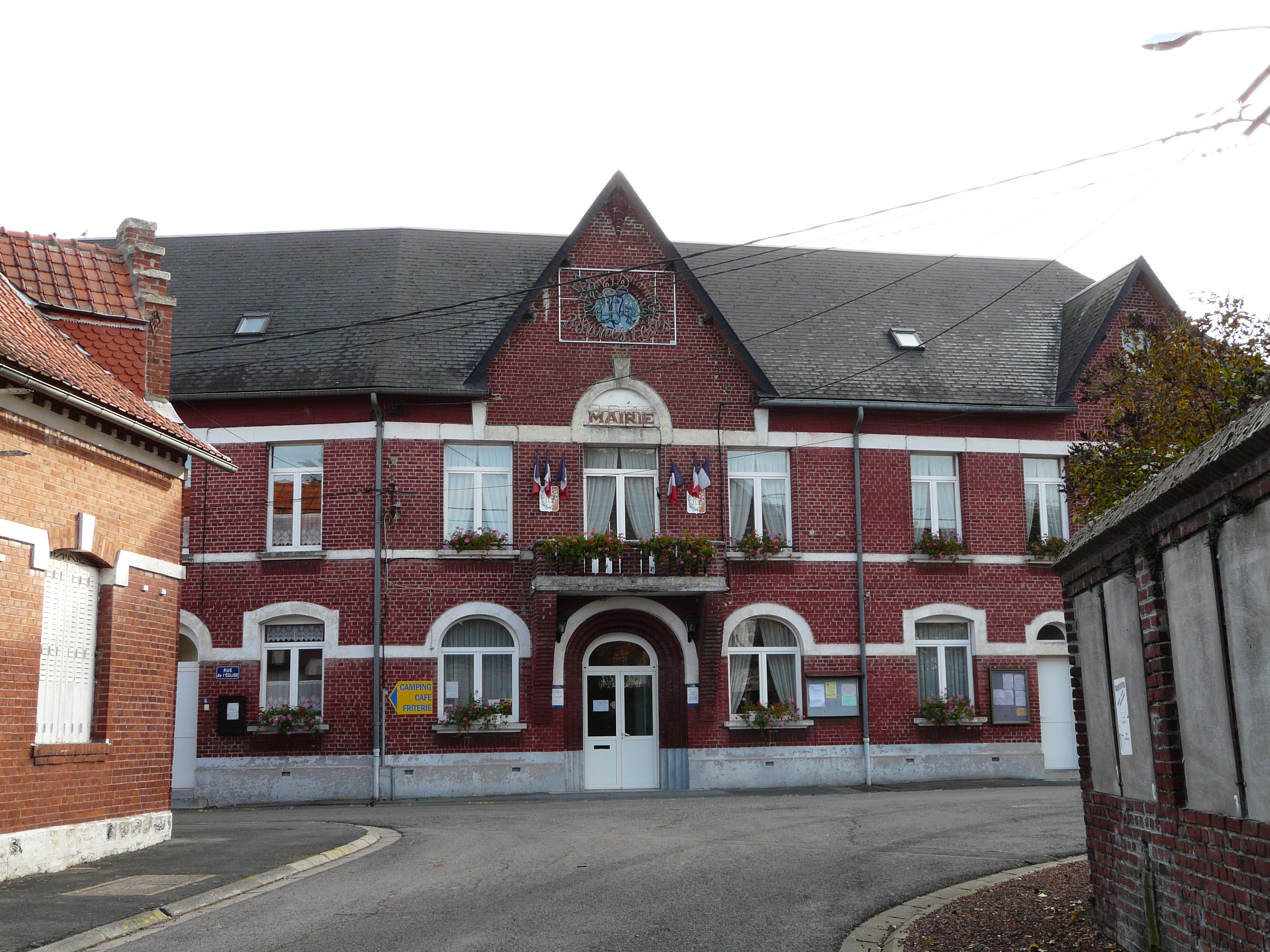
- The town hall in Honnecourt-sur-Escaut

- Coat of arms
- Location of Honnecourt-sur-Escaut
- Location within France Location within Hauts-de-France
- Coordinates: 50°02′15″N 3°11′47″E
- Country: France
- Region: Hauts-de-France
- Department: Nord
- Arrondissement: Cambrai
- Canton: Le Cateau-Cambrésis
- Intercommunality: CA Cambrai

Government
  - Mayor (2024–2026): Bernard Maillart
- Area^{1}: 15.49 km^{2} (5.98 sq mi)
- Elevation: 80 m (260 ft)
- Highest elevation: 151 m (495 ft)
- Lowest elevation: 72 m (236 ft)
- Population (2023): 710
  - Density: 46/km^{2} (120/sq mi)
- Time zone: UTC+01:00 (CET)
  - Summer (DST): UTC+02:00 (CEST)
- INSEE/Postal code: 59312 /59266
- ^{1} French Land Register data, which excludes lakes, ponds, glaciers > 1 km^{2} (0.386 sq mi or 247 acres) and river estuaries.

Honnecourt-sur-Escaut (French pronunciation: [ɔnkuʁ syʁ ɛsko], literally Honnecourt on Escaut) is a commune in the Nord department in northern France.

== Heraldry ==
Arms of Honnecourt-sur-Escaut	The arms of Honnecourt-sur-Escaut are blazoned : Argent billetty, a lion gules. (Bazenville, Haucourt-en-Cambrésis, Honnecourt-sur-Escaut and Sailly-lez-Cambrai use the same arms.)

== See also ==
- Communes of the Nord department
