= Catillon-sur-Sambre =

- Commune
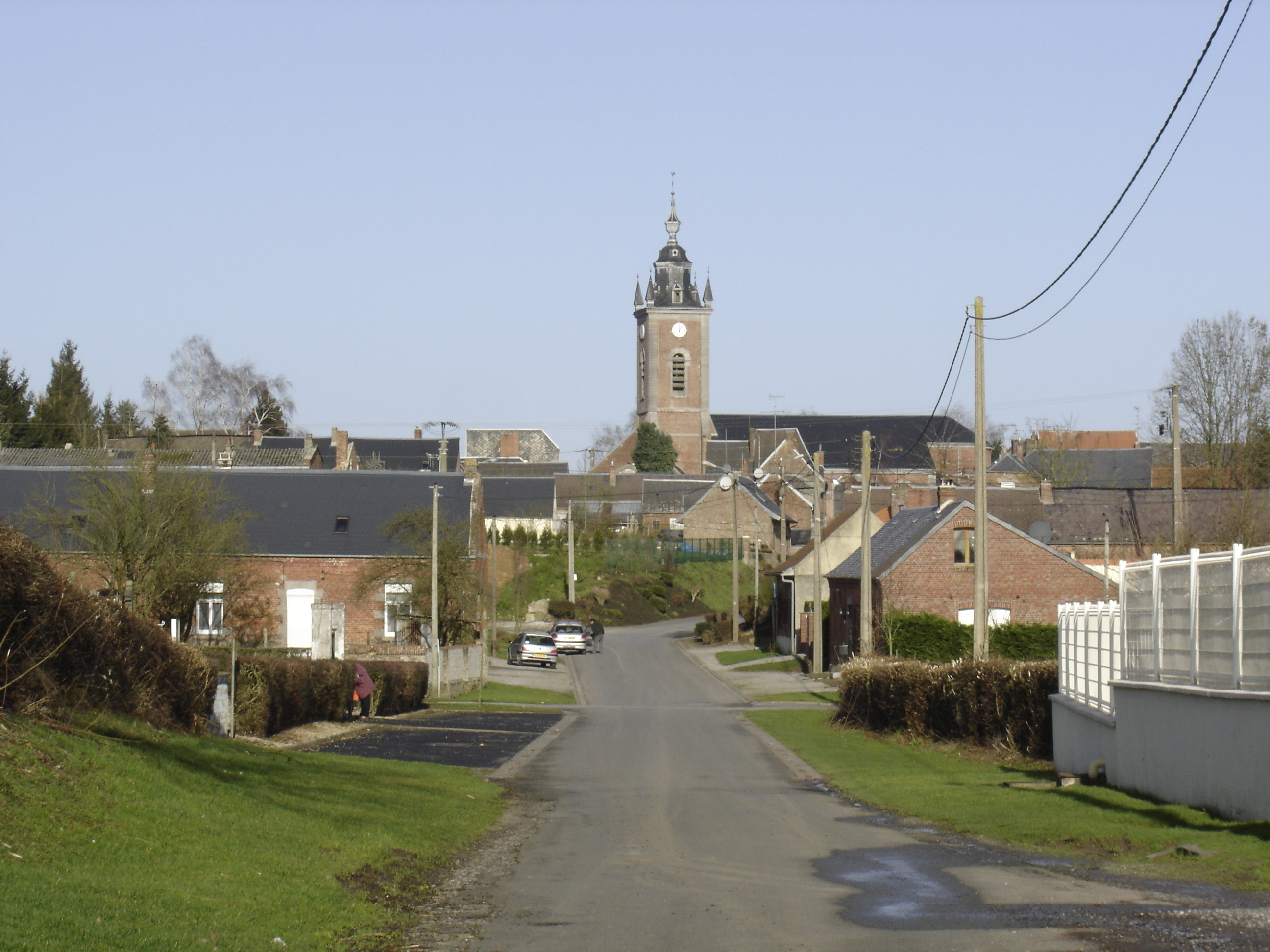
- A general view of Catillon-sur-Sambre

- Coat of arms
- Location of Catillon-sur-Sambre
- Location within France Location within Hauts-de-France
- Coordinates: 50°04′26″N 3°38′35″E
- Country: France
- Region: Hauts-de-France
- Department: Nord
- Arrondissement: Cambrai
- Canton: Le Cateau-Cambrésis
- Intercommunality: CA Caudrésis–Catésis

Government
  - Mayor (2020–2026): Brigitte Leduc
- Area^{1}: 13.03 km^{2} (5.03 sq mi)
- Highest elevation: 167 m (548 ft)
- Lowest elevation: 133 m (436 ft)
- Population (2023): 781
  - Density: 59.9/km^{2} (155/sq mi)
- Time zone: UTC+01:00 (CET)
  - Summer (DST): UTC+02:00 (CEST)
- INSEE/Postal code: 59137 /59360
- ^{1} French Land Register data, which excludes lakes, ponds, glaciers > 1 km^{2} (0.386 sq mi or 247 acres) and river estuaries.

Catillon-sur-Sambre (French pronunciation: [katijɔ̃ syʁ sɑ̃bʁ], literally Catillon on Sambre) is a commune of the Nord department in northern France.

== Heraldry ==
Arms of Catillon-sur-Sambre	The arms of Catillon-sur-Sambre are blazoned : Gules, a castle argent charged on its door with the letter K sable.

== See also ==
- Communes of the Nord department
