= Neuvilly =

- Commune
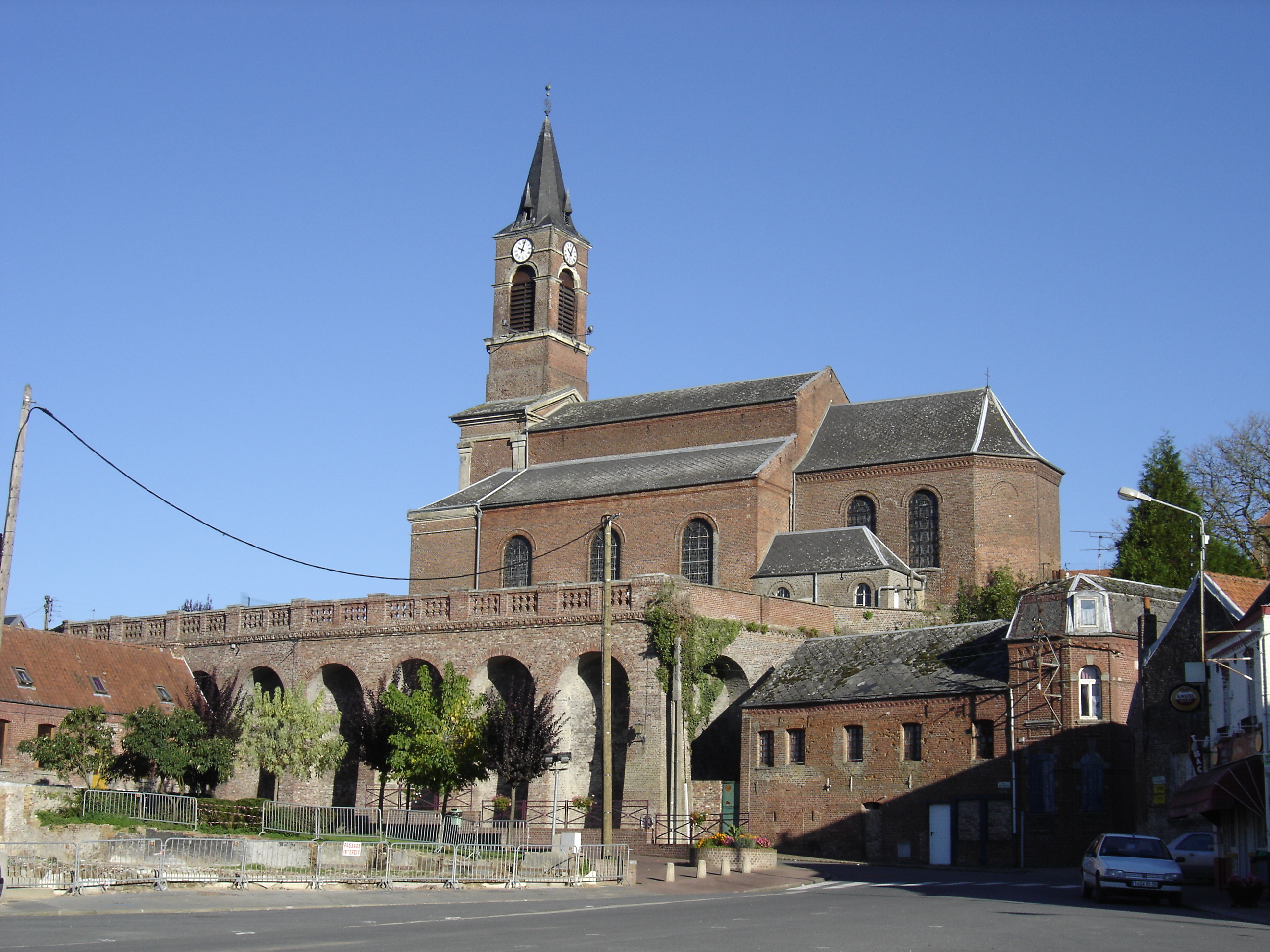
- The church in Neuvilly

- Coat of arms
- Location of Neuvilly
- Location within France Location within Hauts-de-France
- Coordinates: 50°08′32″N 3°30′42″E
- Country: France
- Region: Hauts-de-France
- Department: Nord
- Arrondissement: Cambrai
- Canton: Le Cateau-Cambrésis
- Intercommunality: CA Caudrésis–Catésis

Government
  - Mayor (2020–2026): Ludovic Havart
- Area^{1}: 12.57 km^{2} (4.85 sq mi)
- Highest elevation: 144 m (472 ft)
- Lowest elevation: 71 m (233 ft)
- Population (2023): 1,103
  - Density: 87.75/km^{2} (227.3/sq mi)
- Time zone: UTC+01:00 (CET)
  - Summer (DST): UTC+02:00 (CEST)
- INSEE/Postal code: 59430 /59360
- ^{1} French Land Register data, which excludes lakes, ponds, glaciers > 1 km^{2} (0.386 sq mi or 247 acres) and river estuaries.

Neuvilly is a commune in the Nord department in northern France.

== Heraldry ==
Arms of Neuvilly	The arms of Neuvilly are blazoned : Argent, a cross moline sable. (Challes-les-Eaux, Montalembert, Neuvilly and Pommereuil use the same arms.)

== French sartorial heritage ==
The city was a pivotal center of mulquinerie.

== People ==
Frank Lester is buried there.

== See also ==
- Communes of the Nord department
