= Communes of the Nord department =

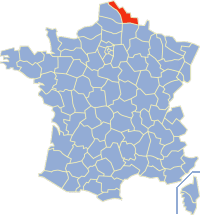

The following is a list of the 647 communes of the Nord department of the French Republic.

The communes cooperate in the following intercommunalities (as of 2025):

- Métropole Européenne de Lille
- Communauté urbaine de Dunkerque
- Communauté d'agglomération de Cambrai
- Communauté d'agglomération du Caudrésis et du Catésis
- Communauté d'agglomération Cœur de Flandre
- CA Douaisis Agglo
- Communauté d'agglomération Maubeuge Val de Sambre
- Communauté d'agglomération de la Porte du Hainaut
- Communauté d'agglomération Valenciennes Métropole
- Communauté de communes du Cœur de l'Avesnois
- Communauté de communes Cœur d'Ostrevent
- Communauté de communes Flandre Lys (partly)
- Communauté de communes des Hauts de Flandre
- Communauté de communes du Pays de Mormal
- Communauté de communes du Pays Solesmois
- Communauté de communes Pévèle-Carembault
- Communauté de communes du Sud Avesnois

INSEE code	Postal code	Commune
59001	59268	Abancourt
59002	59215	Abscon
59003	59149	Aibes
59004	59310	Aix-en-Pévèle
59005	59251	Allennes-les-Marais
59007	59194	Anhiers
59008	59580	Aniche
59010	59400	Anneux
59011	59112	Annœullin
59012	59186	Anor
59013	59152	Anstaing
59014	59410	Anzin
59015	59151	Arleux
59016	59380	Armbouts-Cappel
59017	59280	Armentières
59018	59285	Arnèke
59019	59269	Artres
59021	59600	Assevent
59022	59551	Attiches
59023	59265	Aubencheul-au-Bac
59024	59165	Auberchicourt
59025	59249	Aubers
59026	59265	Aubigny-au-Bac
59027	59494	Aubry-du-Hainaut
59028	59950	Auby
59029	59310	Auchy-lez-Orchies
59031	59570	Audignies
59033	59620	Aulnoye-Aymeries
59032	59300	Aulnoy-lez-Valenciennes
59034	59710	Avelin
59035	59440	Avesnelles
59037	59129	Avesnes-les-Aubert
59038	59296	Avesnes-le-Sec
59036	59440	Avesnes-sur-Helpe
59039	59400	Awoingt
59041	59138	Bachant
59042	59830	Bachy
59043	59270	Bailleul
59044	59780	Baisieux
59045	59132	Baives
59046	59470	Bambecque
59047	59266	Banteux
59048	59554	Bantigny
59049	59266	Bantouzelle
59050	59440	Bas-Lieu
59051	59480	La Bassée
59052	59221	Bauvin
59053	59570	Bavay
59054	59670	Bavinchove
59055	59360	Bazuel
59056	59134	Beaucamps-Ligny
59057	59530	Beaudignies
59058	59330	Beaufort
59059	59540	Beaumont-en-Cambrésis
59060	59730	Beaurain
59061	59550	Beaurepaire-sur-Sambre
59062	59740	Beaurieux
59063	59157	Beauvois-en-Cambrésis
59064	59135	Bellaing
59065	59570	Bellignies
59066	59740	Bérelles
59067	59380	Bergues
59068	59145	Berlaimont
59069	59213	Bermerain
59071	59235	Bersée
59072	59600	Bersillies
59073	59270	Berthen
59074	59980	Bertry
59075	59540	Béthencourt
59076	59600	Bettignies
59077	59570	Bettrechies
59078	59216	Beugnies
59079	59192	Beuvrages
59080	59310	Beuvry-la-Forêt
59081	59217	Bévillers
59082	59380	Bierne
59083	59380	Bissezeele
59084	59173	Blaringhem
59085	59268	Blécourt
59086	59299	Boeschepe
59087	59189	Boëseghem
59088	59280	Bois-Grenier
59089	59470	Bollezeele
59090	59910	Bondues
59091	59190	Borre
59092	59111	Bouchain
59093	59440	Boulogne-sur-Helpe
59094	59630	Bourbourg
59096	59830	Bourghelles
59097	62147	Boursies
59098	59166	Bousbecque
59099	59222	Bousies
59100	59178	Bousignies
59101	59149	Bousignies-sur-Roc
59102	59217	Boussières-en-Cambrésis
59103	59330	Boussières-sur-Sambre
59104	59168	Boussois
59105	59870	Bouvignies
59106	59830	Bouvines
59107	59123	Bray-Dunes
59108	59730	Briastre
59109	59178	Brillon
59110	59630	Brouckerque
59111	59470	Broxeele
59112	59860	Bruay-sur-l'Escaut
59113	59490	Bruille-lez-Marchiennes
59114	59199	Bruille-Saint-Amand
59115	59151	Brunémont
59116	59144	Bry
59117	59151	Bugnicourt
59118	59137	Busigny
59119	59285	Buysscheure
59120	59190	Caëstre
59121	59161	Cagnoncles
59122	59400	Cambrai
59123	59133	Camphin-en-Carembault
59124	59780	Camphin-en-Pévèle
59125	59267	Cantaing-sur-Escaut
59126	59169	Cantin
59127	59213	Capelle
59128	59160	Capinghem
59130	59630	Cappelle-Brouck
59129	59242	Cappelle-en-Pévèle
59131	59180	Cappelle-la-Grande
59132	59217	Carnières
59133	59112	Carnin
59134	59244	Cartignies
59135	59670	Cassel
59136	59360	Le Cateau-Cambrésis
59137	59360	Catillon-sur-Sambre
59138	59217	Cattenières
59139	59540	Caudry
59140	59191	Caullery
59141	59400	Cauroir
59142	59680	Cerfontaine
59143	59930	La Chapelle-d'Armentières
59144	59230	Château-l'Abbaye
59145	59147	Chemy
59146	59152	Chéreng
59147	59740	Choisies
59148	59740	Clairfayts
59149	59225	Clary
59150	59830	Cobrieux
59151	59680	Colleret
59152	59560	Comines
59153	59163	Condé-sur-l'Escaut
59155	59210	Coudekerque-Branche
59156	59552	Courchelettes
59157	59149	Cousolre
59158	59310	Coutiches
59159	59279	Craywick
59160	59154	Crespin
59161	59258	Crèvecœur-sur-l'Escaut
59162	59380	Crochte
59163	59170	Croix
59164	59222	Croix-Caluyau
59165	59553	Cuincy
59166	59990	Curgies
59167	59268	Cuvillers
59168	59830	Cysoing
59169	59680	Damousies
59170	59187	Dechy
59171	59127	Dehéries
59172	59220	Denain
59173	59890	Deûlémont
59174	59740	Dimechaux
59175	59216	Dimont
59176	62147	Doignies
59177	59440	Dompierre-sur-Helpe
59670	59272	Don
59178	59500	Douai
59179	59282	Douchy-les-Mines
59180	59940	Le Doulieu
59181	59440	Dourlers
59182	59630	Drincham
59183	59140	Dunkirk (Dunkerque)
59184	59173	Ebblinghem
59185	59176	Écaillon
59186	59740	Eccles
59187	59330	Éclaibes
59188	59620	Écuélin
59189	59114	Eecke
59190	59600	Élesmes
59191	59127	Élincourt
59192	59580	Émerchicourt
59193	59320	Emmerin
59194	59530	Englefontaine
59195	59320	Englos
59196	59320	Ennetières-en-Weppes
59197	59710	Ennevelin
59198	59132	Eppe-Sauvage
59199	59169	Erchin
59200	59470	Eringhem
59201	59320	Erquinghem-le-Sec
59202	59193	Erquinghem-Lys
59203	59171	Erre
59204	59213	Escarmain
59205	59124	Escaudain
59206	59161	Escaudœuvres
59207	59278	Escautpont
59208	59320	Escobecques
59209	59127	Esnes
59210	59470	Esquelbecq
59211	59553	Esquerchin
59212	59940	Estaires
59213	59400	Estourmel
59214	59151	Estrées
59215	59990	Estreux
59219	59295	Estrun
59216	59161	Eswars
59217	59144	Eth
59218	59219	Étrœungt
59220	59155	Faches-Thumesnil
59221	59300	Famars
59222	59310	Faumont
59223	59550	Le Favril
59224	59247	Féchain
59225	59750	Feignies
59226	59740	Felleries
59227	59179	Fenain
59228	59169	Férin
59229	59610	Féron
59230	59680	Ferrière-la-Grande
59231	59680	Ferrière-la-Petite
59232	59570	La Flamengrie
59233	59440	Flaumont-Waudrechies
59234	59128	Flers-en-Escrebieux
59236	59267	Flesquières
59237	59270	Flêtre
59238	59158	Flines-lès-Mortagne
59239	59148	Flines-lez-Raches
59240	59440	Floursies
59241	59219	Floyon
59242	59550	Fontaine-au-Bois
59243	59157	Fontaine-au-Pire
59244	59400	Fontaine-Notre-Dame
59246	59222	Forest-en-Cambrésis
59247	59510	Forest-sur-Marque
59249	59610	Fourmies
59250	59134	Fournes-en-Weppes
59251	59530	Frasnoy
59252	59236	Frelinghien
59253	59970	Fresnes-sur-Escaut
59254	59234	Fressain
59255	59268	Fressies
59256	59273	Fretin
59257	59249	Fromelles
59258	59242	Genech
59259	59530	Ghissignies
59260	59254	Ghyvelde
59261	59132	Glageon
59262	59270	Godewaersvelde
59263	59169	Gœulzin
59264	59600	Gognies-Chaussée
59265	59144	Gommegnies
59266	59147	Gondecourt
59267	59231	Gonnelieu
59268	59253	La Gorgue
59269	59231	Gouzeaucourt
59271	59760	Grande-Synthe
59270	59244	Grand-Fayt
59272	59153	Grand-Fort-Philippe
59273	59820	Gravelines
59274	59360	La Groise
59275	59152	Gruson
59276	59287	Guesnain
59277	59570	Gussignies
59278	59320	Hallennes-lez-Haubourdin
59279	59250	Halluin
59280	59151	Hamel
59281	59496	Hantay
59282	59670	Hardifort
59283	59138	Hargnies
59284	59178	Hasnon
59285	59198	Haspres
59286	59320	Haubourdin
59287	59191	Haucourt-en-Cambrésis
59288	59121	Haulchin
59289	59294	Haussy
59290	59440	Haut-Lieu
59291	59330	Hautmont
59292	59255	Haveluy
59293	59660	Haverskerque
59294	59268	Haynecourt
59295	59190	Hazebrouck
59296	59530	Hecq
59297	59171	Hélesmes
59299	59510	Hem
59300	59247	Hem-Lenglet
59301	59199	Hergnies
59302	59195	Hérin
59303	59134	Herlies
59304	59147	Herrin
59305	59470	Herzeele
59306	59740	Hestrud
59307	59143	Holque
59308	59190	Hondeghem
59309	59122	Hondschoote
59310	59570	Hon-Hergies
59311	59980	Honnechy
59312	59266	Honnecourt-sur-Escaut
59313	59111	Hordain
59314	59171	Hornaing
59315	59570	Houdain-lez-Bavay
59316	59263	Houplin-Ancoisne
59317	59116	Houplines
59318	59470	Houtkerque
59319	59492	Hoymille
59320	59480	Illies
59321	59540	Inchy
59322	59141	Iwuy
59323	59144	Jenlain
59324	59460	Jeumont
59325	59530	Jolimetz
59326	59122	Killem

INSEE code	Postal code	Commune
59327	59167	Lallaing
59328	59130	Lambersart
59329	59552	Lambres-lez-Douai
59330	59310	Landas
59331	59550	Landrecies
59332	59390	Lannoy
59333	59219	Larouillies
59334	59553	Lauwin-Planque
59335	59226	Lecelles
59336	59259	Lécluse
59337	59143	Lederzeele
59338	59470	Ledringhem
59339	59115	Leers
59340	59495	Leffrinckoucke
59341	59258	Lesdain
59343	59810	Lesquin
59344	59620	Leval
59345	59287	Lewarde
59346	59260	Lezennes
59342	59740	Lez-Fontaine
59347	59740	Liessies
59348	59111	Lieu-Saint-Amand
59349	59191	Ligny-en-Cambrésis
59350	59000	Lille
59351	59330	Limont-Fontaine
59352	59126	Linselles
59353	59530	Locquignol
59354	59182	Loffre
59356	59840	Lompret
59357	59570	La Longueville
59358	59630	Looberghe
59359	59279	Loon-Plage
59360	59120	Loos
59361	59156	Lourches
59363	59530	Louvignies-Quesnoy
59364	59830	Louvil
59365	59720	Louvroil
59366	59173	Lynde
59367	59390	Lys-lez-Lannoy
59368	59110	La Madeleine
59369	59233	Maing
59370	59600	Mairieux
59371	59134	Le Maisnil
59372	59127	Malincourt
59374	59440	Marbaix
59375	59870	Marchiennes
59377	59159	Marcoing
59378	59700	Marcq-en-Barœul
59379	59252	Marcq-en-Ostrevent
59381	59990	Maresches
59382	59238	Maretz
59383	59770	Marly
59384	59550	Maroilles
59385	59164	Marpent
59387	59252	Marquette-en-Ostrevant
59386	59520	Marquette-lez-Lille
59388	59274	Marquillies
59389	59241	Masnières
59390	59176	Masny
59391	59172	Mastaing
59392	59600	Maubeuge
59393	59158	Maulde
59394	59980	Maurois
59395	59360	Mazinghien
59396	59570	Mecquignies
59397	59470	Merckeghem
59398	59710	Mérignies
59399	59270	Merris
59400	59660	Merville
59401	59270	Méteren
59402	59143	Millam
59403	59178	Millonfosse
59405	62147	Mœuvres
59406	59620	Monceau-Saint-Waast
59407	59224	Monchaux-sur-Écaillon
59408	59283	Moncheaux
59409	59234	Monchecourt
59410	59370	Mons-en-Barœul
59411	59246	Mons-en-Pévèle
59412	59360	Montay
59413	59225	Montigny-en-Cambrésis
59414	59182	Montigny-en-Ostrevent
59415	59227	Montrécourt
59416	59190	Morbecque
59418	59158	Mortagne-du-Nord
59419	59310	Mouchin
59420	59132	Moustier-en-Fagne
59421	59420	Mouvaux
59422	59161	Naves
59423	59940	Neuf-Berquin
59424	59330	Neuf-Mesnil
59427	59239	La Neuville
59425	59218	Neuville-en-Avesnois
59426	59960	Neuville-en-Ferrain
59428	59554	Neuville-Saint-Rémy
59429	59293	Neuville-sur-Escaut
59430	59360	Neuvilly
59431	59850	Nieppe
59432	59400	Niergnies
59433	59143	Nieurlet
59434	59230	Nivelle
59435	59310	Nomain
59436	59670	Noordpeene
59437	59139	Noyelles-lès-Seclin
59438	59159	Noyelles-sur-Escaut
59439	59550	Noyelles-sur-Sambre
59440	59282	Noyelles-sur-Selle
59441	59570	Obies
59442	59680	Obrechies
59443	59670	Ochtezeele
59444	59970	Odomez
59445	59132	Ohain
59446	59195	Oisy
59447	59264	Onnaing
59448	59122	Oost-Cappel
59449	59310	Orchies
59006	59144	L'Orée de Mormal
59450	59360	Ors
59451	59530	Orsinval
59452	59162	Ostricourt
59453	59670	Oudezeele
59454	59670	Oxelaëre
59455	59295	Paillencourt
59456	59146	Pecquencourt
59457	59840	Pérenchies
59458	59273	Péronne-en-Mélantois
59459	59494	Petite-Forêt
59461	59244	Petit-Fayt
59462	59133	Phalempin
59463	59284	Pitgam
59464	59218	Poix-du-Nord
59465	59360	Pommereuil
59466	59710	Pont-à-Marcq
59467	59138	Pont-sur-Sambre
59468	59530	Potelle
59469	59190	Pradelles
59470	59840	Prémesques
59471	59990	Préseau
59472	59288	Preux-au-Bois
59473	59144	Preux-au-Sart
59474	59550	Prisches
59475	59121	Prouvy
59476	59267	Proville
59477	59185	Provin
59478	59380	Quaëdypre
59479	59243	Quarouble
59480	59269	Quérénaing
59481	59530	Le Quesnoy
59482	59890	Quesnoy-sur-Deûle
59483	59680	Quiévelon
59484	59920	Quiévrechain
59485	59214	Quiévy
59486	59194	Râches
59487	59320	Radinghem-en-Weppes
59488	59554	Raillencourt-Sainte-Olle
59489	59283	Raimbeaucourt
59490	59177	Rainsars
59491	59590	Raismes
59492	59161	Ramillies
59493	59177	Ramousies
59494	59530	Raucourt-au-Bois
59495	59245	Recquignies
59496	59360	Rejet-de-Beaulieu
59497	59173	Renescure
59498	59980	Reumont
59499	59122	Rexpoëde
59500	59159	Ribécourt-la-Tour
59501	59870	Rieulay
59502	59277	Rieux-en-Cambrésis
59503	59550	Robersart
59504	59172	Rœulx
59505	59990	Rombies-et-Marchipont
59506	59730	Romeries
59507	59790	Ronchin
59508	59223	Roncq
59509	59286	Roost-Warendin
59511	59230	Rosult
59512	59100	Roubaix
59513	59169	Roucourt
59514	59131	Rousies
59515	59220	Rouvignies
59516	59285	Rubrouck
59517	59258	Les Rues-des-Vignes
59518	59530	Ruesnes
59519	59226	Rumegies
59520	59281	Rumilly-en-Cambrésis
59521	59554	Sailly-lez-Cambrai
59522	59390	Sailly-lez-Lannoy
59523	59262	Sainghin-en-Mélantois
59524	59184	Sainghin-en-Weppes
59525	59177	Sains-du-Nord
59526	59230	Saint-Amand-les-Eaux
59527	59350	Saint-André-lez-Lille
59528	59188	Saint-Aubert
59529	59440	Saint-Aubin
59530	59163	Saint-Aybert
59531	59360	Saint-Benin
59532	59820	Saint-Georges-sur-l'Aa
59533	59292	Saint-Hilaire-lez-Cambrai
59534	59440	Saint-Hilaire-sur-Helpe
59535	59270	Saint-Jans-Cappel
59537	59213	Saint-Martin-sur-Écaillon
59538	59143	Saint-Momelin
59539	59630	Saint-Pierre-Brouck
59541	59730	Saint-Python
59542	59620	Saint-Remy-Chaussée
59543	59330	Saint-Remy-du-Nord
59544	59880	Saint-Saulve
59545	59360	Saint-Souplet
59546	59114	Saint-Sylvestre-Cappel
59547	59188	Saint-Vaast-en-Cambrésis
59548	59570	Saint-Waast
59536	59670	Sainte-Marie-Cappel
59549	59218	Salesches
59550	59496	Salomé
59551	59310	Saméon
59552	59268	Sancourt
59553	59211	Santes
59554	59230	Sars-et-Rosières
59555	59216	Sars-Poteries
59556	59145	Sassegnies
59557	59990	Saultain
59558	59227	Saulzoir
59559	59990	Sebourg
59560	59113	Seclin
59562	59440	Sémeries
59563	59440	Semousies
59564	59174	La Sentinelle
59565	59269	Sepmeries
59566	59320	Sequedin
59567	59400	Séranvillers-Forenville
59568	59173	Sercus
59569	59450	Sin-le-Noble
59570	59380	Socx
59571	59730	Solesmes
59572	59740	Solre-le-Château
59573	59740	Solrinnes
59574	59490	Somain
59575	59213	Sommaing
59576	59380	Spycker
59577	59190	Staple
59578	59189	Steenbecque
59579	59380	Steene
59580	59114	Steenvoorde
59581	59181	Steenwerck
59582	59270	Strazeele
59583	59550	Taisnières-en-Thiérache
59584	59570	Taisnières-sur-Hon
59585	59175	Templemars
59586	59242	Templeuve-en-Pévèle
59587	59114	Terdeghem
59588	59229	Téteghem-Coudekerque-Village
59589	59224	Thiant
59590	59189	Thiennes
59591	59163	Thivencelle
59592	59239	Thumeries
59593	59141	Thun-l'Évêque
59594	59158	Thun-Saint-Amand
59595	59141	Thun-Saint-Martin
59597	59554	Tilloy-lez-Cambrai
59596	59870	Tilloy-lez-Marchiennes
59598	59390	Toufflers
59599	59200	Tourcoing
59600	59551	Tourmignies
59601	59132	Trélon
59602	59152	Tressin
59603	59125	Trith-Saint-Léger
59604	59980	Troisvilles
59605	59229	Uxem
59606	59300	Valenciennes
59607	59218	Vendegies-au-Bois
59608	59213	Vendegies-sur-Écaillon
59609	59175	Vendeville
59610	59227	Verchain-Maugré
59611	59237	Verlinghem
59612	59730	Vertain
59613	59970	Vicq
59614	59271	Viesly
59615	59232	Vieux-Berquin
59616	59690	Vieux-Condé
59617	59138	Vieux-Mesnil
59618	59600	Vieux-Reng
59009	59650	Villeneuve-d'Ascq
59619	59530	Villereau
59620	59234	Villers-au-Tertre
59622	59188	Villers-en-Cauchies
59623	59297	Villers-Guislain
59624	59142	Villers-Outréaux
59625	59231	Villers-Plouich
59626	59530	Villers-Pol
59627	59600	Villers-Sire-Nicole
59628	59470	Volckerinckhove
59629	59870	Vred
59630	59261	Wahagnies
59631	59127	Walincourt-Selvigny
59632	59135	Wallers
59633	59132	Wallers-en-Fagne
59634	59190	Wallon-Cappel
59635	59400	Wambaix
59636	59118	Wambrechies
59637	59870	Wandignies-Hamage
59638	59830	Wannehain
59639	59144	Wargnies-le-Grand
59640	59144	Wargnies-le-Petit
59641	59380	Warhem
59642	59870	Warlaing
59643	59560	Warneton
59645	59252	Wasnes-au-Bac
59646	59290	Wasquehal
59647	59143	Watten
59648	59139	Wattignies
59649	59680	Wattignies-la-Victoire
59650	59150	Wattrelos
59651	59220	Wavrechain-sous-Denain
59652	59111	Wavrechain-sous-Faulx
59653	59136	Wavrin
59654	59119	Waziers
59655	59670	Wemaers-Cappel
59656	59117	Wervicq-Sud
59657	59380	West-Cappel
59658	59134	Wicres
59659	59212	Wignehies
59660	59780	Willems
59661	59740	Willies
59662	59670	Winnezeele
59663	59470	Wormhout
59664	59143	Wulverdinghe
59665	59380	Wylder
59666	59470	Zegerscappel
59667	59670	Zermezeele
59668	59123	Zuydcoote
59669	59670	Zuytpeene
