= Canton of Cambrai =

Coordinates: 50.18°N 3.23°E

The canton of Cambrai is an administrative division of the Nord department, northern France. It was created at the French canton reorganisation which came into effect in March 2015. Its seat is in Cambrai.

It consists of the following communes:

1. Abancourt
2. Anneux
3. Aubencheul-au-Bac
4. Bantigny
5. Blécourt
6. Boursies
7. Cambrai
8. Cuvillers
9. Doignies
10. Escaudœuvres
11. Eswars
12. Estrun
13. Fontaine-Notre-Dame
14. Fressies
15. Haynecourt
16. Hem-Lenglet
17. Mœuvres
18. Neuville-Saint-Rémy
19. Paillencourt
20. Proville
21. Raillencourt-Sainte-Olle
22. Ramillies
23. Sailly-lez-Cambrai
24. Sancourt
25. Thun-l'Évêque
26. Thun-Saint-Martin
27. Tilloy-lez-Cambrai
