= Raillencourt-Sainte-Olle =

- Commune
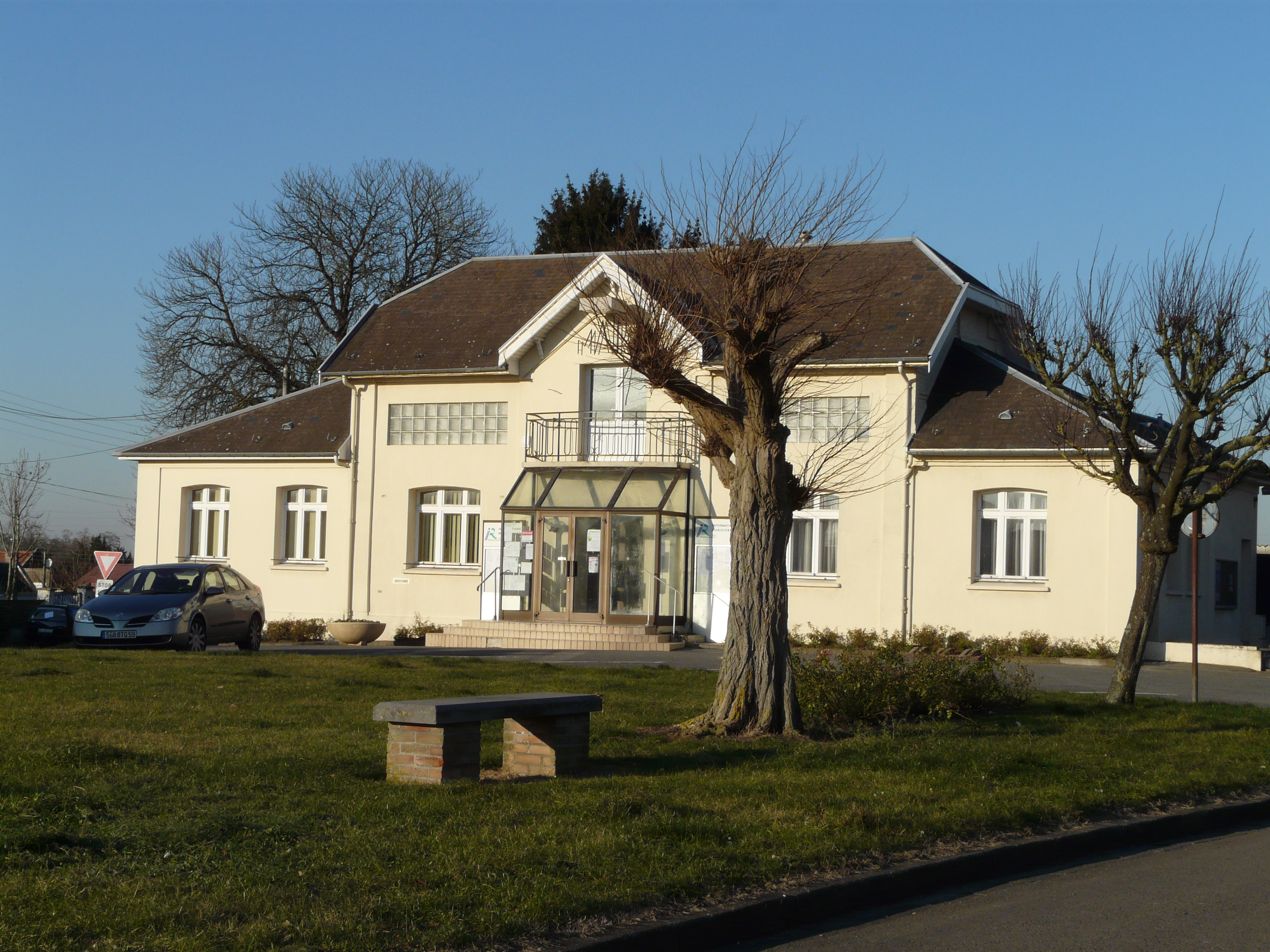
- The town hall in Raillencourt-Sainte-Olle

- Coat of arms
- Location of Raillencourt-Sainte-Olle
- Location within France Location within Hauts-de-France
- Coordinates: 50°11′33″N 3°10′09″E
- Country: France
- Region: Hauts-de-France
- Department: Nord
- Arrondissement: Cambrai
- Canton: Cambrai
- Intercommunality: CA Cambrai

Government
  - Mayor (2020–2026): Bernard De Narda
- Area^{1}: 7.09 km^{2} (2.74 sq mi)
- Elevation: 63 m (207 ft)
- Highest elevation: 86 m (282 ft)
- Lowest elevation: 45 m (148 ft)
- Population (2023): 2,127
  - Density: 300/km^{2} (777/sq mi)
- Time zone: UTC+01:00 (CET)
  - Summer (DST): UTC+02:00 (CEST)
- INSEE/Postal code: 59488 /59554
- ^{1} French Land Register data, which excludes lakes, ponds, glaciers > 1 km^{2} (0.386 sq mi or 247 acres) and river estuaries.

Raillencourt-Sainte-Olle (French pronunciation: [ʁajɑ̃kuʁ sɛ̃t ɔl]) is a commune in the Nord department in northern France.

== Population ==
Historical population
| Year | Pop. | ±% p.a. |
|---|---|---|
| 1968 | 1,891 | — |
| 1975 | 1,826 | −0.50% |
| 1982 | 2,201 | +2.70% |
| 1990 | 2,220 | +0.11% |
| 1999 | 2,280 | +0.30% |
| 2007 | 2,378 | +0.53% |
| 2012 | 2,347 | −0.26% |
| 2017 | 2,238 | −0.95% |
| 2023 | 2,127 | −0.84% |
Source: INSEE

== Heraldry ==
| Arms of Raillencourt-Sainte-Olle | The arms of Raillencourt-Sainte-Olle are blazoned : Gules, 3 fesses Or, a bordure argent. |

== See also ==
- Communes of the Nord department
