= Blécourt, Nord =

Blécourt
- Commune
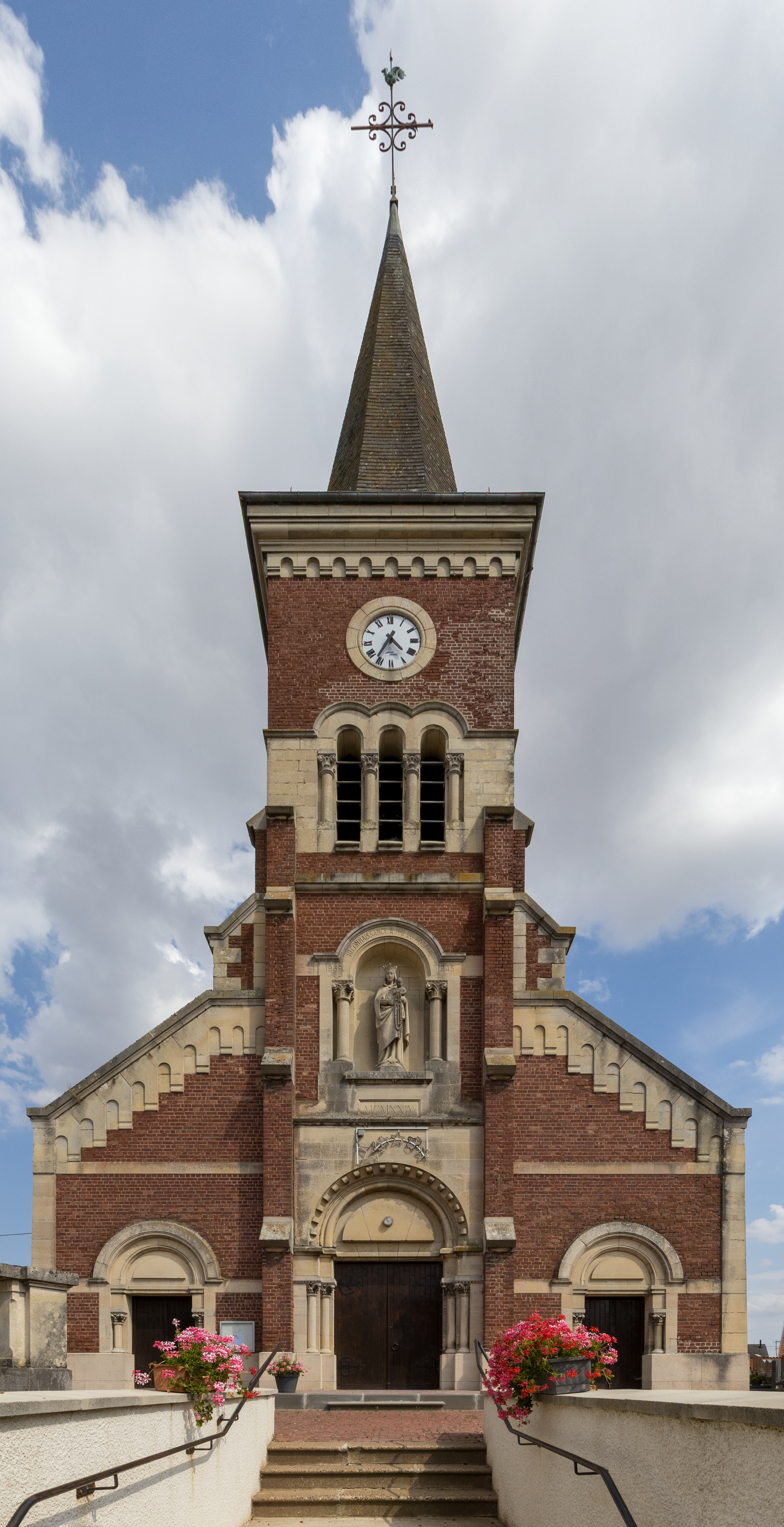
- The church in Blécourt

- Coat of arms
- Location of Blécourt
- Location within France Location within Hauts-de-France
- Coordinates: 50°13′16″N 3°12′52″E
- Country: France
- Region: Hauts-de-France
- Department: Nord
- Arrondissement: Cambrai
- Canton: Cambrai
- Intercommunality: CA Cambrai

Government
  - Mayor (2020–2026): Jean-Paul Basselet
- Area^{1}: 3.58 km^{2} (1.38 sq mi)
- Highest elevation: 72 m (236 ft)
- Lowest elevation: 48 m (157 ft)
- Population (2023): 313
  - Density: 87.4/km^{2} (226/sq mi)
- Time zone: UTC+01:00 (CET)
  - Summer (DST): UTC+02:00 (CEST)
- INSEE/Postal code: 59085 /59268
- ^{1} French Land Register data, which excludes lakes, ponds, glaciers > 1 km^{2} (0.386 sq mi or 247 acres) and river estuaries.

Blécourt (French pronunciation: [blekuʁ]) is a commune in the Nord department in northern France.

== Population ==
Historical population
Year	Pop.	±% p.a.
1968	264	—
1975	273	+0.48%
1982	326	+2.57%
1990	326	+0.00%
1999	346	+0.66%
2007	360	+0.50%
2012	342	−1.02%
2017	306	−2.20%
2023	313	+0.38%
Source: INSEE

== Heraldry ==
Arms of Blécourt	The arms of Blécourt are blazoned : Or, 3 lions sable.

== See also ==
- Communes of the Nord department
