= Fressies =

- Commune
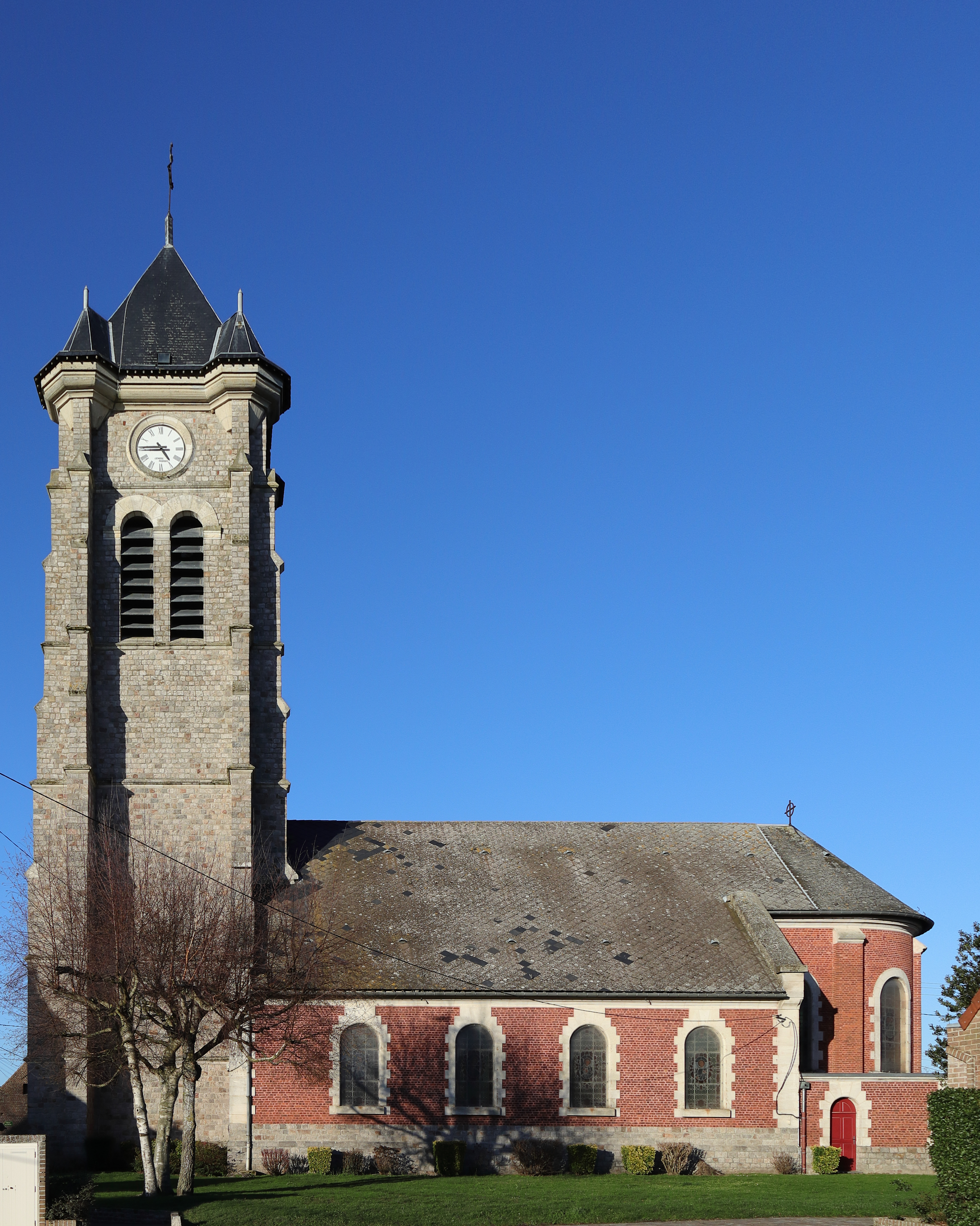
- The church in Fressies

- Coat of arms
- Location of Fressies
- Location within France Location within Hauts-de-France
- Coordinates: 50°15′22″N 3°11′43″E
- Country: France
- Region: Hauts-de-France
- Department: Nord
- Arrondissement: Cambrai
- Canton: Cambrai
- Intercommunality: CA Cambrai

Government
  - Mayor (2020–2026): Marie-Danièle Chevalier
- Area^{1}: 4.73 km^{2} (1.83 sq mi)
- Elevation: 42 m (138 ft)
- Highest elevation: 77 m (253 ft)
- Lowest elevation: 32 m (105 ft)
- Population (2023): 571
  - Density: 121/km^{2} (313/sq mi)
- Time zone: UTC+01:00 (CET)
  - Summer (DST): UTC+02:00 (CEST)
- INSEE/Postal code: 59255 /59268
- ^{1} French Land Register data, which excludes lakes, ponds, glaciers > 1 km^{2} (0.386 sq mi or 247 acres) and river estuaries.

Fressies (French pronunciation: [fʁɛsi]) is a commune in the Nord department in northern France.

== Heraldry ==
Arms of Fressies	The arms of Fressies are blazoned : Or, a cross engrailed sable and a canton gules.

== See also ==
- Communes of the Nord department
