= Sailly-lez-Cambrai =

- Commune
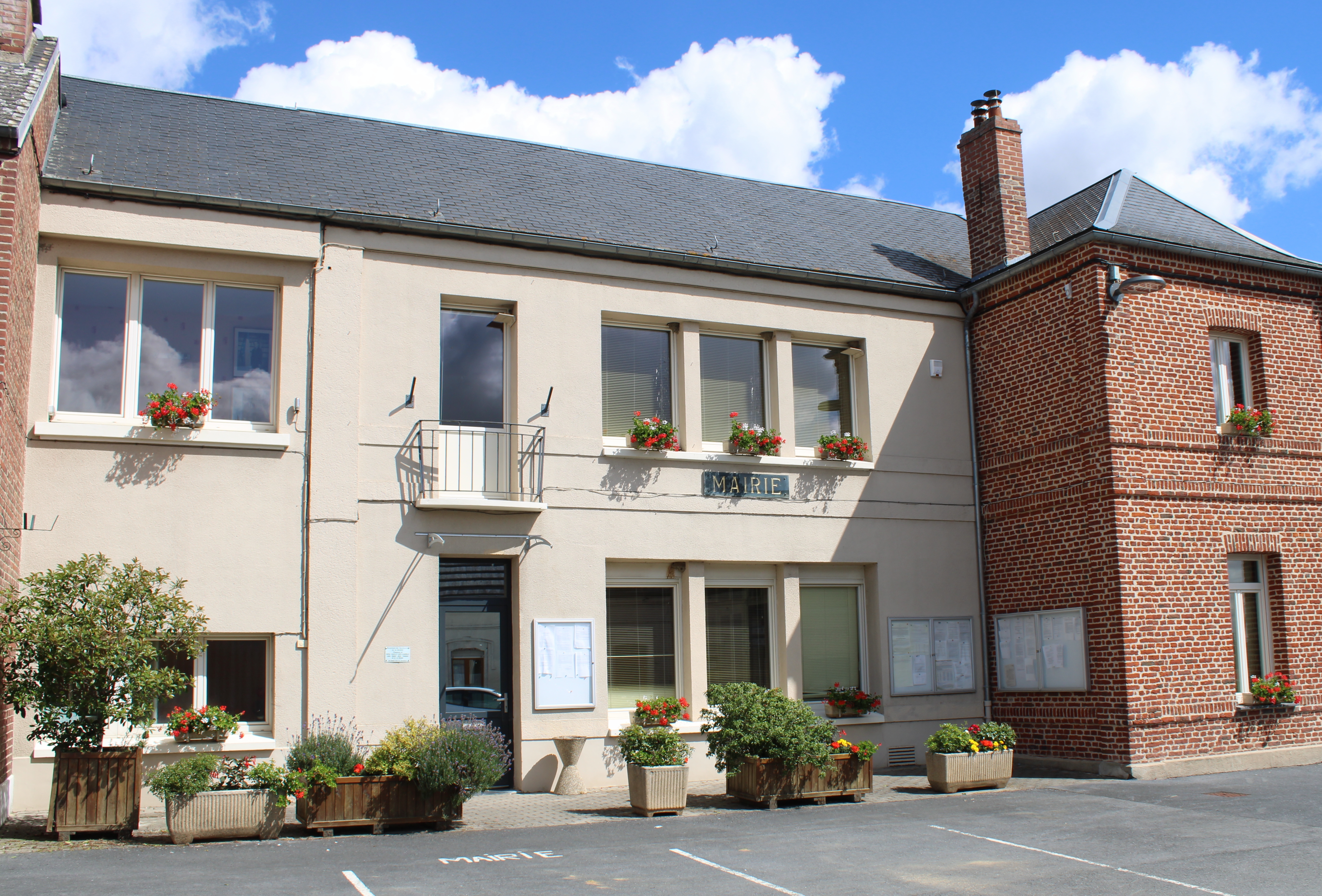
- The town hall in Sailly-lez-Cambrai

- Coat of arms
- Location of Sailly-lez-Cambrai
- Location within France Location within Hauts-de-France
- Coordinates: 50°11′33″N 3°10′42″E
- Country: France
- Region: Hauts-de-France
- Department: Nord
- Arrondissement: Cambrai
- Canton: Cambrai
- Intercommunality: CA Cambrai

Government
  - Mayor (2020–2026): Marie-Thérèse Doigneaux
- Area^{1}: 3.28 km^{2} (1.27 sq mi)
- Elevation: 85 m (279 ft)
- Highest elevation: 82 m (269 ft)
- Lowest elevation: 55 m (180 ft)
- Population (2023): 409
  - Density: 125/km^{2} (323/sq mi)
- Time zone: UTC+01:00 (CET)
  - Summer (DST): UTC+02:00 (CEST)
- INSEE/Postal code: 59521 /59554
- ^{1} French Land Register data, which excludes lakes, ponds, glaciers > 1 km^{2} (0.386 sq mi or 247 acres) and river estuaries.

Sailly-lez-Cambrai is a commune in the Nord department in northern France.

== Heraldry ==
Arms of Sailly-lez-Cambrai	The arms of Sailly-lez-Cambrai are blazoned : Argent billetty, a lion gules. (Bazenville, Haucourt-en-Cambrésis, Honnecourt-sur-Escaut and Sailly-lez-Cambrai use the same arms.)

== See also ==
- Communes of the Nord department
