= Mœuvres =

- Commune
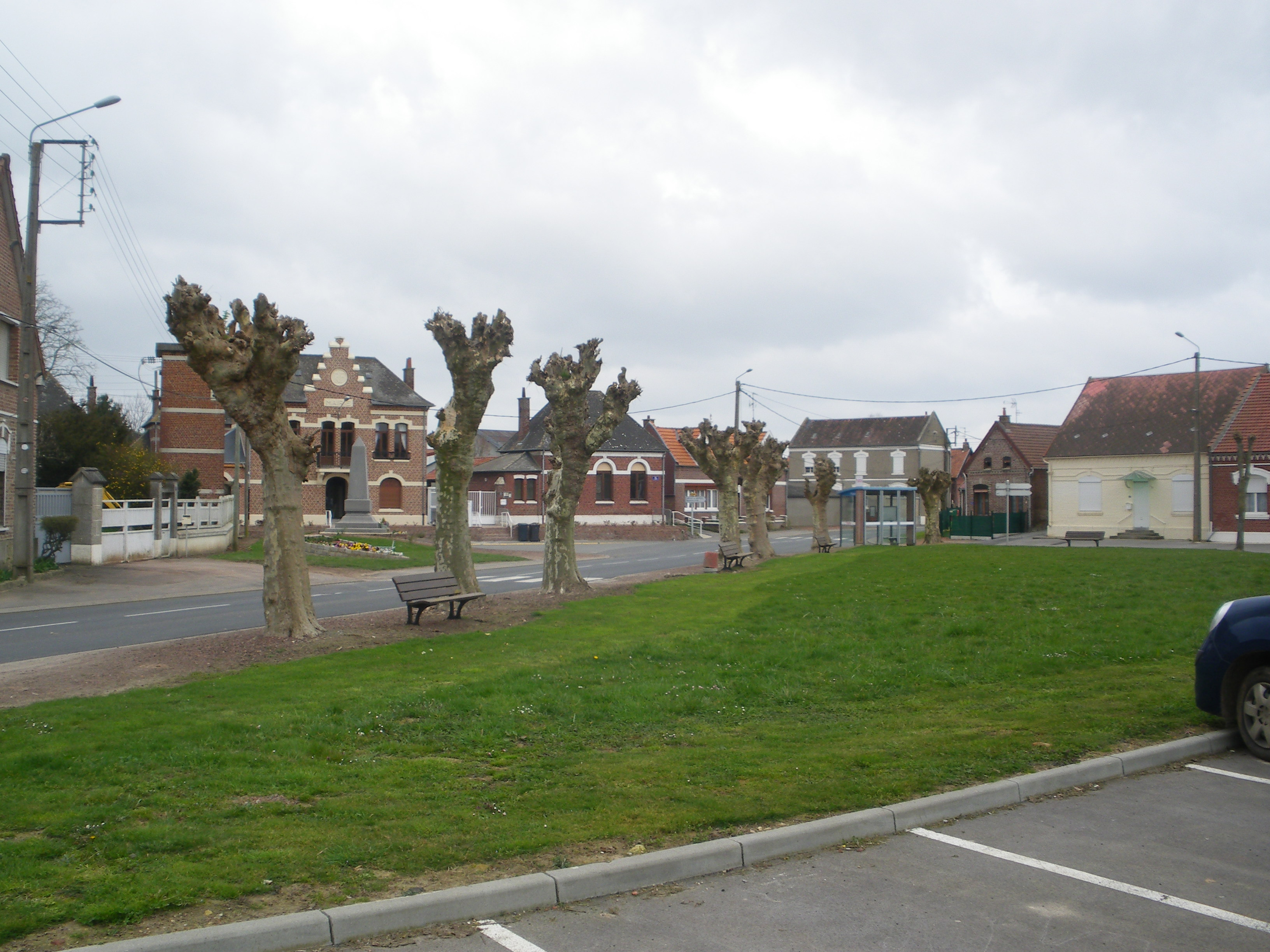
- The main square in Mœuvres

- Coat of arms
- Location of Mœuvres
- Location within France Location within Hauts-de-France
- Coordinates: 50°09′51″N 3°03′54″E
- Country: France
- Region: Hauts-de-France
- Department: Nord
- Arrondissement: Cambrai
- Canton: Cambrai
- Intercommunality: CA Cambrai

Government
  - Mayor (2020–2026): Gérard Sétan
- Area^{1}: 7.38 km^{2} (2.85 sq mi)
- Elevation: 58 m (190 ft)
- Highest elevation: 96 m (315 ft)
- Lowest elevation: 53 m (174 ft)
- Population (2023): 490
  - Density: 66/km^{2} (170/sq mi)
- Time zone: UTC+01:00 (CET)
  - Summer (DST): UTC+02:00 (CEST)
- INSEE/Postal code: 59405 /59400
- ^{1} French Land Register data, which excludes lakes, ponds, glaciers > 1 km^{2} (0.386 sq mi or 247 acres) and river estuaries.

Mœuvres (French pronunciation: [mœvʁ]) is a commune in the Nord department in northern France.

== Heraldry ==
Arms of Mœuvres	The arms of Mœuvres are blazoned : Gules, 2 chevrons argent.

== See also ==
- Communes of the Nord department
