= Eswars =

- Commune
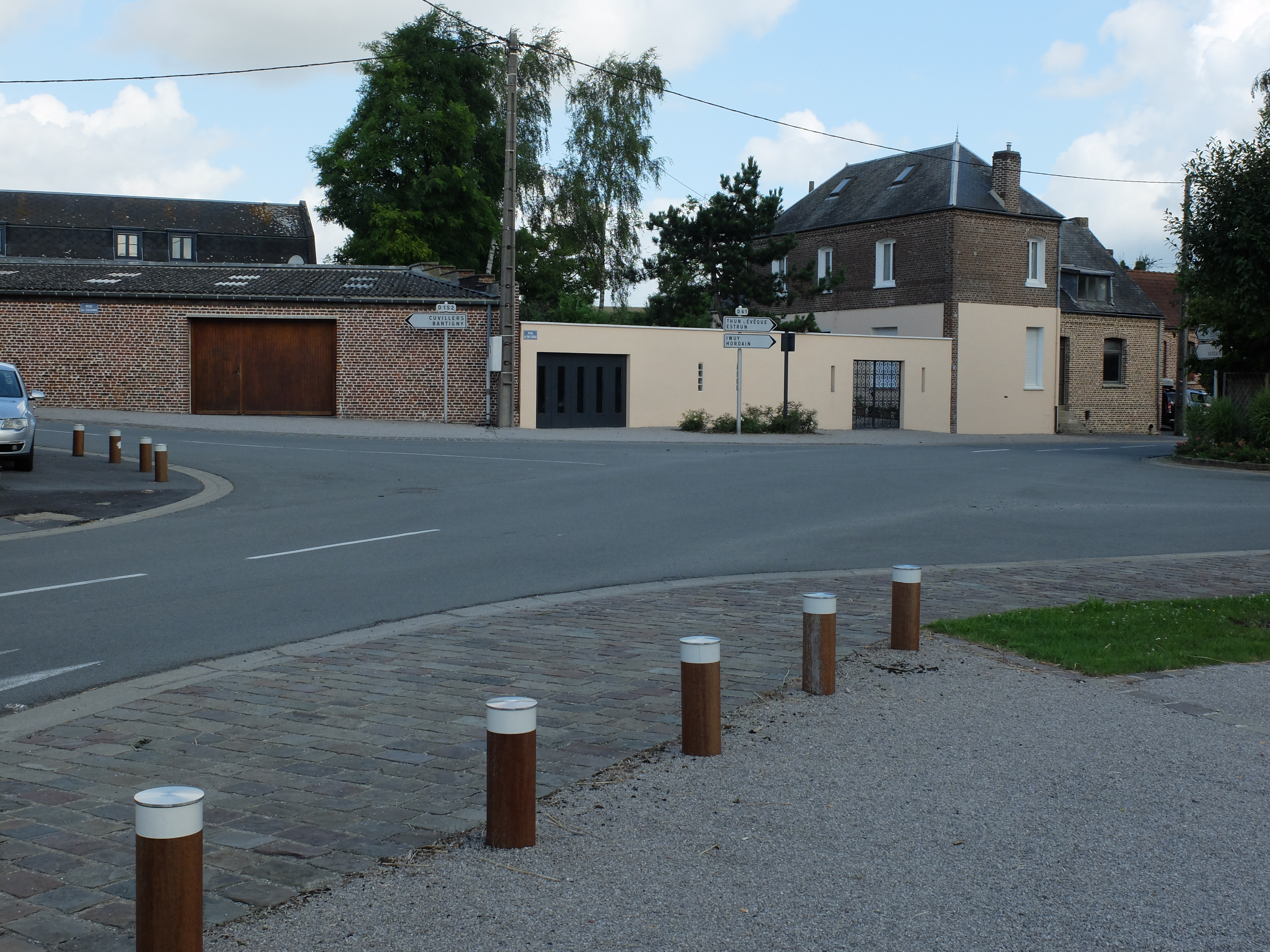
- A view within Eswars

- Coat of arms
- Location of Eswars
- Location within France Location within Hauts-de-France
- Coordinates: 50°13′13″N 3°16′09″E
- Country: France
- Region: Hauts-de-France
- Department: Nord
- Arrondissement: Cambrai
- Canton: Cambrai
- Intercommunality: CA Cambrai

Government
  - Mayor (2020–2026): Francis Régnault
- Area^{1}: 2.78 km^{2} (1.07 sq mi)
- Elevation: 49 m (161 ft)
- Highest elevation: 71 m (233 ft)
- Lowest elevation: 38 m (125 ft)
- Population (2023): 363
  - Density: 131/km^{2} (338/sq mi)
- Time zone: UTC+01:00 (CET)
  - Summer (DST): UTC+02:00 (CEST)
- INSEE/Postal code: 59216 /59161
- ^{1} French Land Register data, which excludes lakes, ponds, glaciers > 1 km^{2} (0.386 sq mi or 247 acres) and river estuaries.

Eswars (French pronunciation: [ewaʁ]) is a commune in the Nord department in northern France.

== Heraldry ==
Arms of Eswars	The arms of Eswars are blazoned : Gules, a bend Or charged in chief with a lion azure, armed and langued gules.

== See also ==
- Communes of the Nord department
