= Cauroir =

- Commune
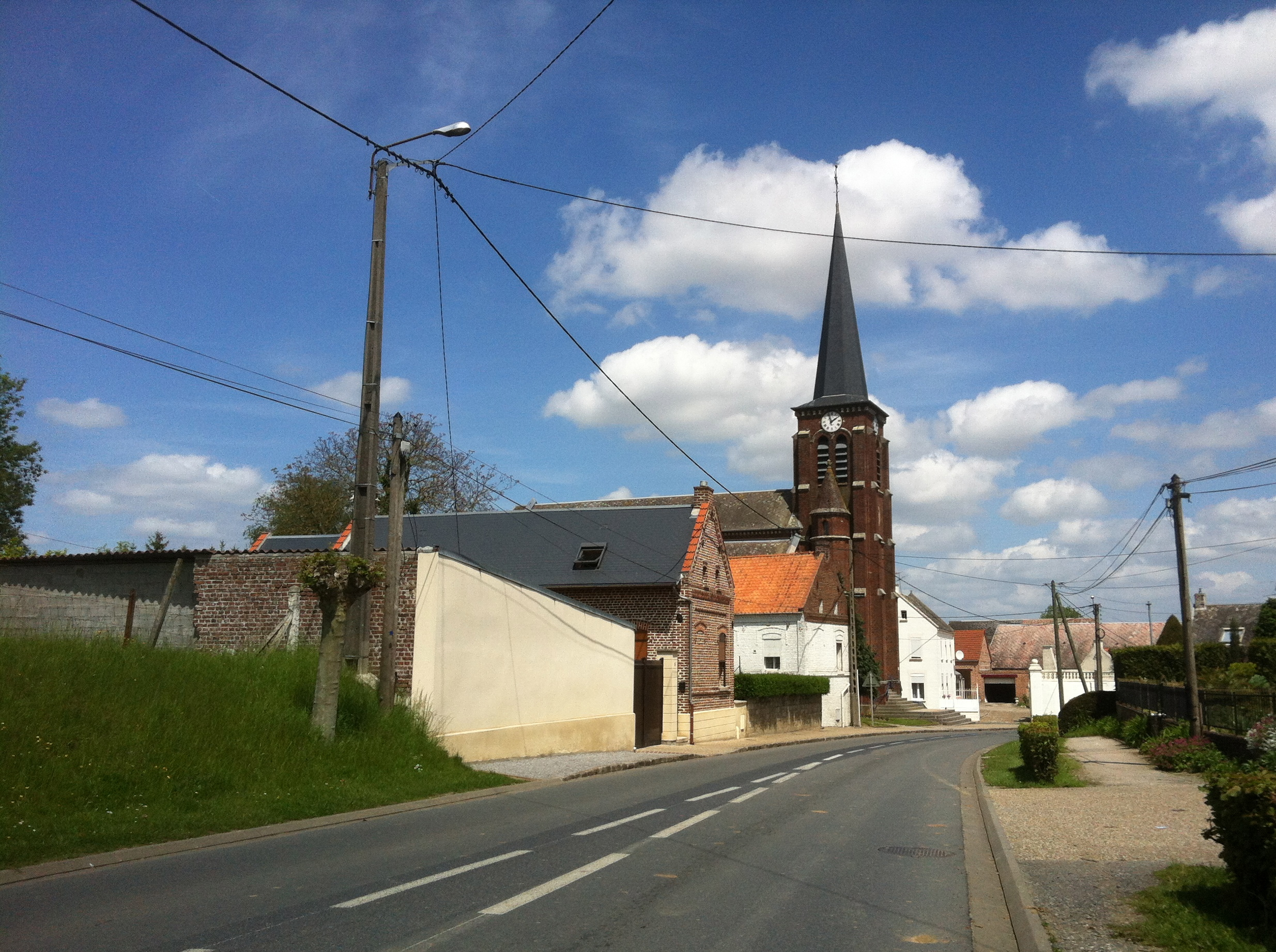
- The church in Cauroir

- Coat of arms
- Location of Cauroir
- Location within France Location within Hauts-de-France
- Coordinates: 50°10′30″N 3°18′07″E
- Country: France
- Region: Hauts-de-France
- Department: Nord
- Arrondissement: Cambrai
- Canton: Caudry
- Intercommunality: CA Cambrai

Government
  - Mayor (2020–2026): Benoît Dhordain
- Area^{1}: 5.61 km^{2} (2.17 sq mi)
- Elevation: 59 m (194 ft)
- Highest elevation: 82 m (269 ft)
- Lowest elevation: 51 m (167 ft)
- Population (2023): 579
  - Density: 103/km^{2} (267/sq mi)
- Time zone: UTC+01:00 (CET)
  - Summer (DST): UTC+02:00 (CEST)
- INSEE/Postal code: 59141 /59400
- ^{1} French Land Register data, which excludes lakes, ponds, glaciers > 1 km^{2} (0.386 sq mi or 247 acres) and river estuaries.

Cauroir (French pronunciation: [koʁwaʁ]) is a commune of the Nord department in northern France.

== Heraldry ==
Arms of Cauroir	The arms of Cauroir are blazoned : Azure, an inescutcheon argent, and in chief (in fess) 3 martlets Or. (Cauroir and Salomé use the same arms.)

== See also ==
- Communes of the Nord department
