= Salomé, Nord =

Salomé
- Commune
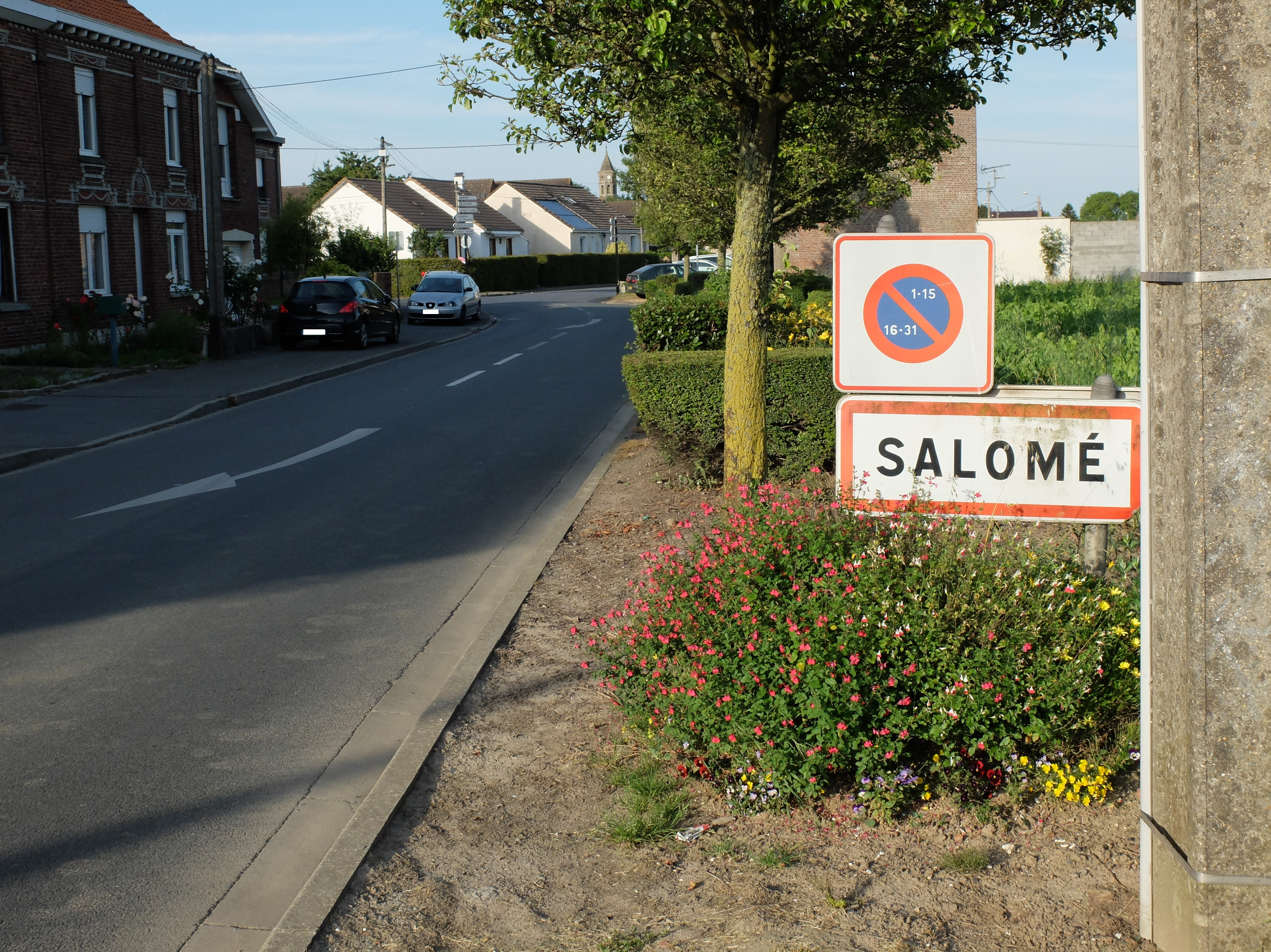
- The road into Salomé

- Coat of arms
- Location of Salomé
- Location within France Location within Hauts-de-France
- Coordinates: 50°32′08″N 2°50′24″E
- Country: France
- Region: Hauts-de-France
- Department: Nord
- Arrondissement: Lille
- Canton: Annœullin
- Intercommunality: Métropole Européenne de Lille

Government
  - Mayor (2020–2026): Pierre Canesse
- Area^{1}: 5.25 km^{2} (2.03 sq mi)
- Elevation: 35 m (115 ft)
- Highest elevation: 31 m (102 ft)
- Lowest elevation: 20 m (66 ft)
- Population (2023): 3,182
  - Density: 606/km^{2} (1,570/sq mi)
- Time zone: UTC+01:00 (CET)
  - Summer (DST): UTC+02:00 (CEST)
- INSEE/Postal code: 59550 /59496
- ^{1} French Land Register data, which excludes lakes, ponds, glaciers > 1 km^{2} (0.386 sq mi or 247 acres) and river estuaries.

Salomé (French pronunciation: [salɔme]) is a commune in the Nord department in northern France. It is part of the Métropole Européenne de Lille.

== Population ==
Historical population
Year	Pop.	±% p.a.
1968	2,524	—
1975	2,929	+2.15%
1982	2,781	−0.74%
1990	2,955	+0.76%
1999	2,929	−0.10%
2007	3,002	+0.31%
2012	2,972	−0.20%
2017	2,969	−0.02%
2023	3,182	+1.16%
Source: INSEE

== Heraldry ==
Arms of Salomé	The arms of Salomé are blazoned : Azure, an inescutcheon argent, and in chief (in fess) 3 martlets Or. (Cauroir and Salomé use the same arms.)

== See also ==
- Communes of the Nord department
