= Cuvillers =

- Commune
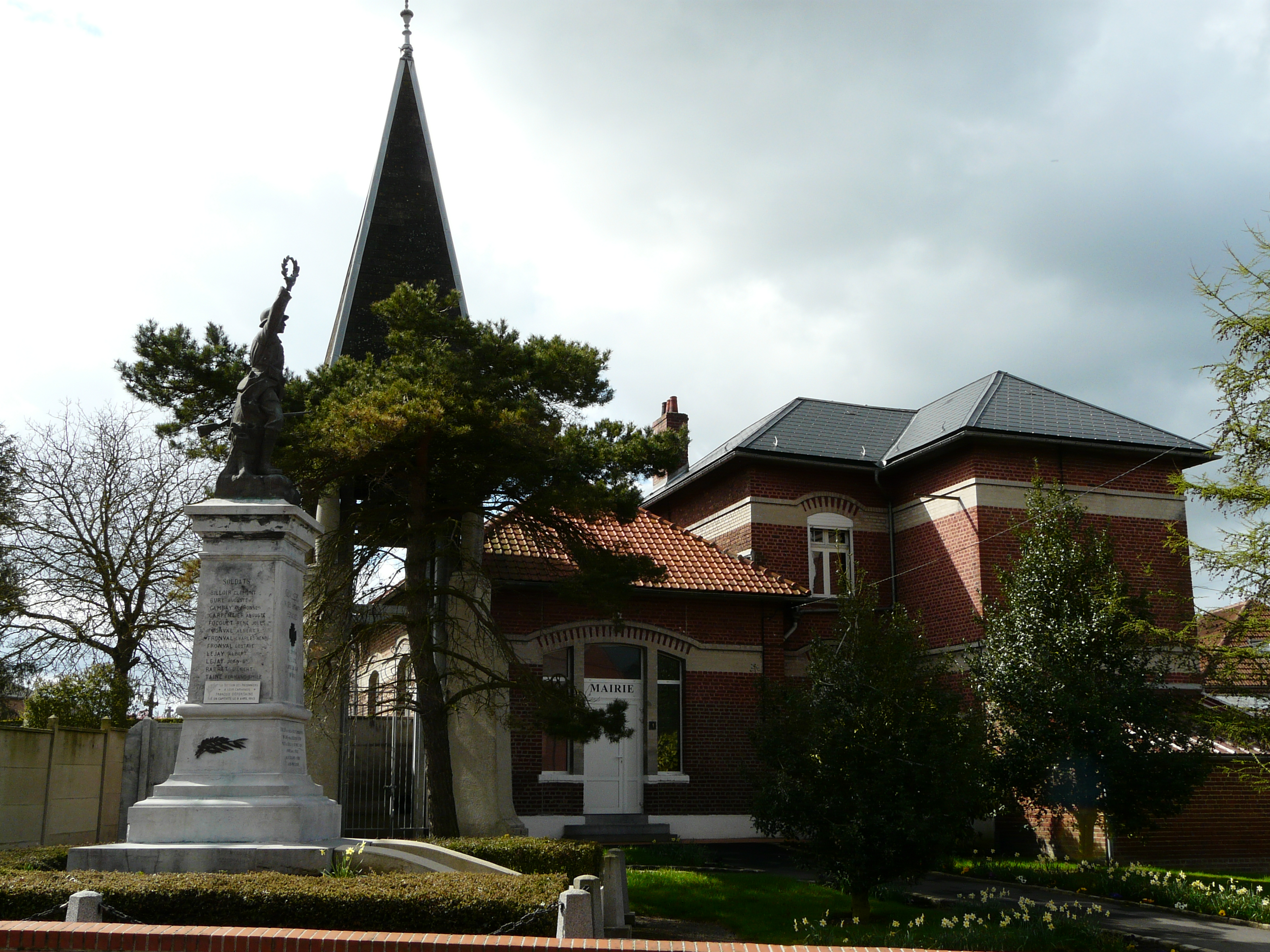
- The town hall in Cuvillers

- Coat of arms
- Location of Cuvillers
- Location within France Location within Hauts-de-France
- Coordinates: 50°13′23″N 3°14′18″E
- Country: France
- Region: Hauts-de-France
- Department: Nord
- Arrondissement: Cambrai
- Canton: Cambrai
- Intercommunality: CA Cambrai

Government
  - Mayor (2020–2026): Jacky Laurent
- Area^{1}: 2.83 km^{2} (1.09 sq mi)
- Highest elevation: 74 m (243 ft)
- Lowest elevation: 49 m (161 ft)
- Population (2023): 177
  - Density: 62.5/km^{2} (162/sq mi)
- Time zone: UTC+01:00 (CET)
  - Summer (DST): UTC+02:00 (CEST)
- INSEE/Postal code: 59167 /59554
- ^{1} French Land Register data, which excludes lakes, ponds, glaciers > 1 km^{2} (0.386 sq mi or 247 acres) and river estuaries.

Cuvillers is a commune in the Nord department in northern France.

== Heraldry ==
Arms of Cuvillers	The arms of Cuvillers are blazoned : Gules, a bend Or. (the family Duke of Noailles and the communes of Noailles, Cuvillers, Tonnerre, Villespy, Crémarest and Vernoil-le-Fourrier use the same arms.)

== See also ==
- Communes of the Nord department
