= Naves, Nord =

Naves
- Commune
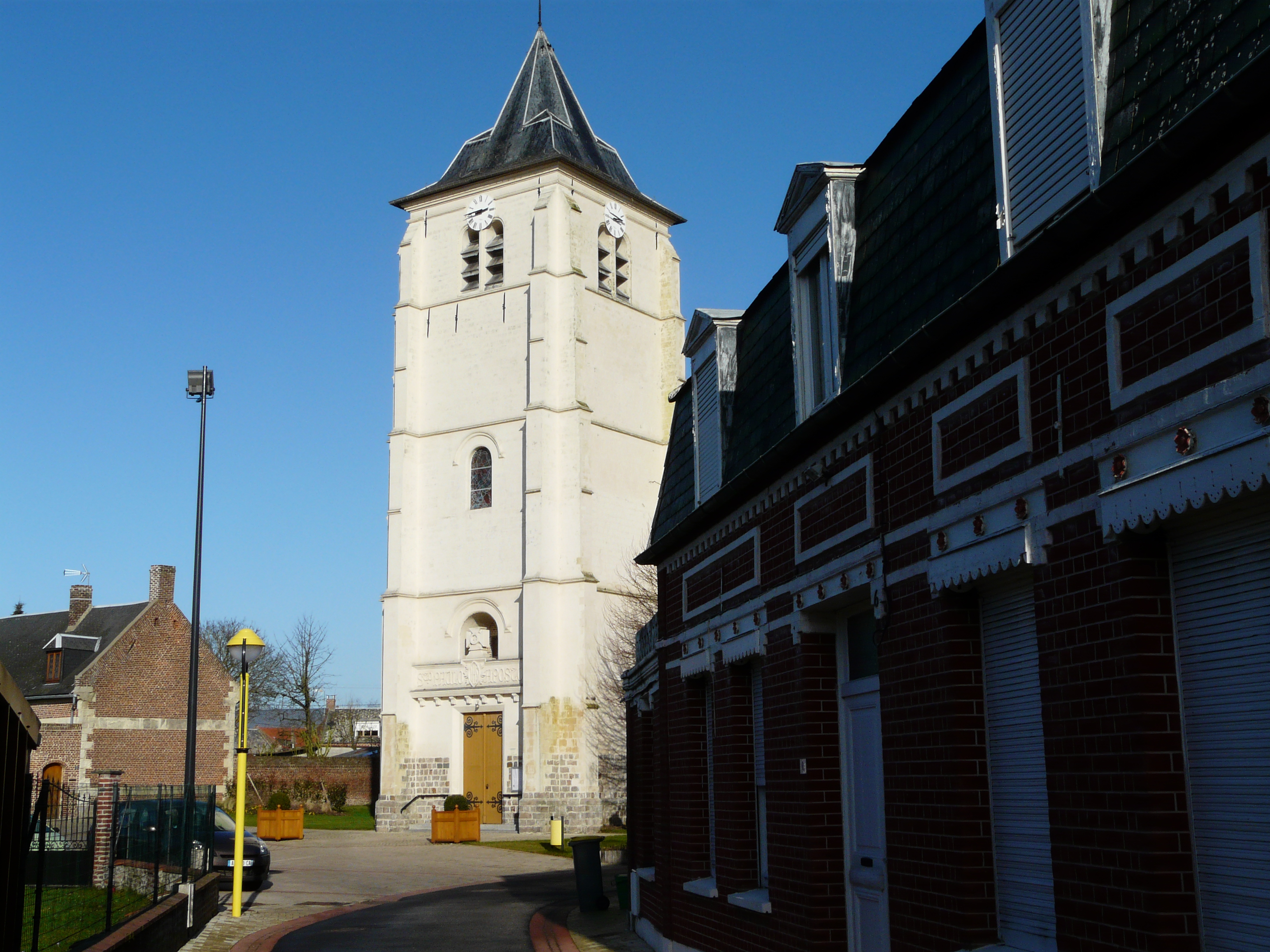
- The church in Naves

- Coat of arms
- Location of Naves
- Location within France Location within Hauts-de-France
- Coordinates: 50°12′11″N 3°18′58″E
- Country: France
- Region: Hauts-de-France
- Department: Nord
- Arrondissement: Cambrai
- Canton: Caudry
- Intercommunality: CA Cambrai

Government
  - Mayor (2020–2026): Jean-Pierre Dhorme
- Area^{1}: 5.19 km^{2} (2.00 sq mi)
- Elevation: 49 m (161 ft)
- Highest elevation: 80 m (260 ft)
- Lowest elevation: 41 m (135 ft)
- Population (2023): 620
  - Density: 120/km^{2} (310/sq mi)
- Time zone: UTC+01:00 (CET)
  - Summer (DST): UTC+02:00 (CEST)
- INSEE/Postal code: 59422 /59161
- ^{1} French Land Register data, which excludes lakes, ponds, glaciers > 1 km^{2} (0.386 sq mi or 247 acres) and river estuaries.

Naves (French pronunciation: [nav]) is a commune in the Nord department in northern France.

It is 8 km (5.0 mi) northeast of Cambrai.

== Heraldry ==
Arms of Naves	The arms of Naves are blazoned : Gules, a bend argent.

== See also ==
- Communes of the Nord department
