= Escaudœuvres =

- Commune
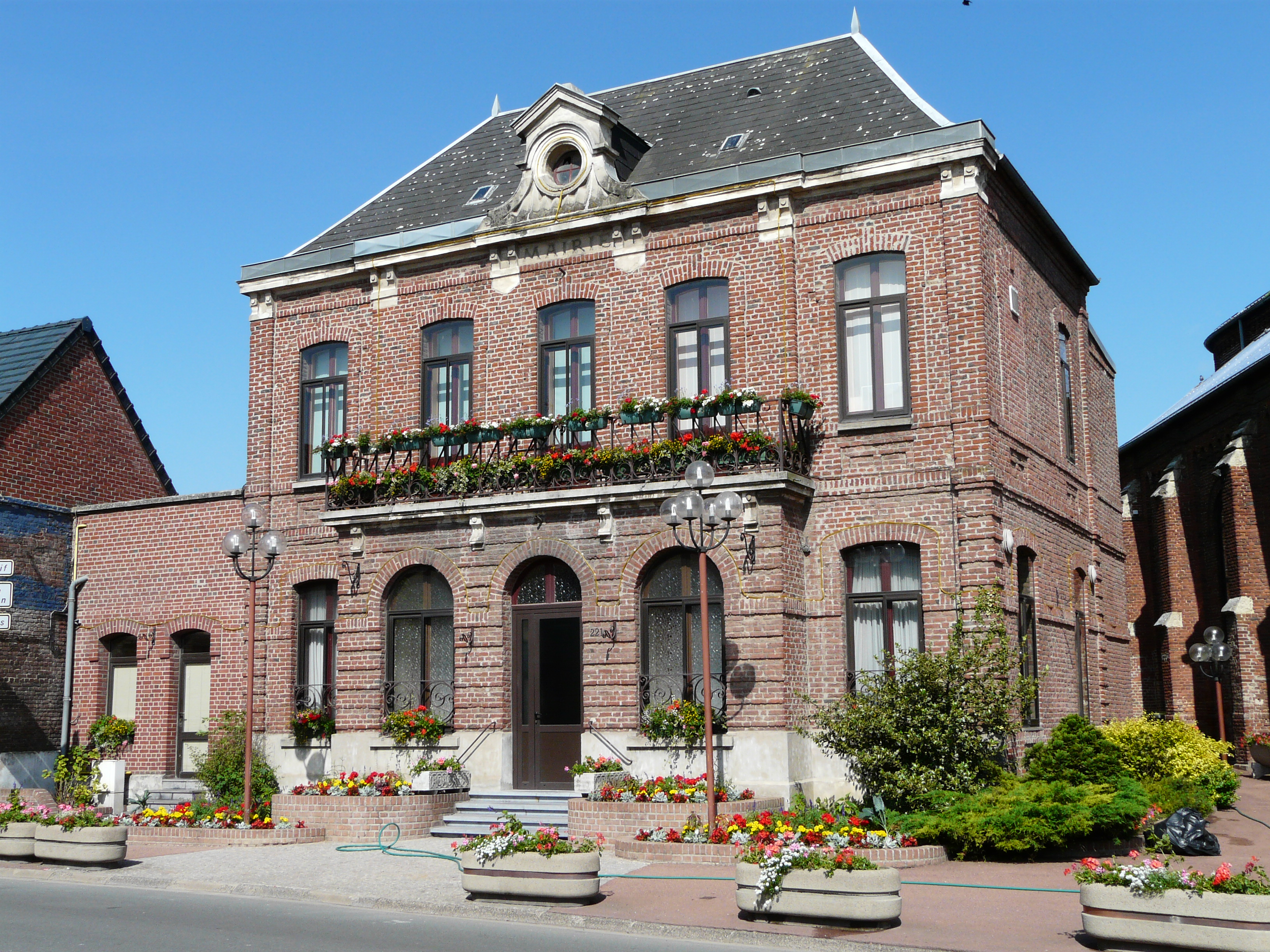
- The town hall in Escaudœuvres

- Coat of arms
- Location of Escaudœuvres
- Location within France Location within Hauts-de-France
- Coordinates: 50°11′35″N 3°15′54″E
- Country: France
- Region: Hauts-de-France
- Department: Nord
- Arrondissement: Cambrai
- Canton: Cambrai
- Intercommunality: CA Cambrai

Government
  - Mayor (2020–2026): Thierry Bouteman
- Area^{1}: 6.64 km^{2} (2.56 sq mi)
- Highest elevation: 77 m (253 ft)
- Lowest elevation: 38 m (125 ft)
- Population (2023): 3,171
  - Density: 478/km^{2} (1,240/sq mi)
- Time zone: UTC+01:00 (CET)
  - Summer (DST): UTC+02:00 (CEST)
- INSEE/Postal code: 59206 /59161
- ^{1} French Land Register data, which excludes lakes, ponds, glaciers > 1 km^{2} (0.386 sq mi or 247 acres) and river estuaries.

Escaudœuvres (French pronunciation: [ekodœvʁ]) is a commune in the Nord department in northern France.

== History ==
Escaudœuvres is famous for being the location of the sugar factory of the Sucrerie centrale de Cambrai. At the time of its construction, this was one of the biggest sugar factories of the world. It later became the Sucrerie Tereos d'Escaudœuvres, but ceased to operate in 2023. The site is now only a logistics facility.

== Population ==
Historical population
Year	Pop.	±% p.a.
1968	3,224	—
1975	3,951	+2.95%
1982	4,234	+0.99%
1990	4,205	−0.09%
1999	3,698	−1.42%
2007	3,399	−1.05%
2012	3,360	−0.23%
2017	3,257	−0.62%
2023	3,171	−0.44%
Source: INSEE

== Heraldry ==
Arms of Escaudœuvres	The arms of Escaudœuvres are blazoned : Vert, 3 fesses ermine.

== See also ==
- Communes of the Nord department
