= Hem-Lenglet =

- Commune
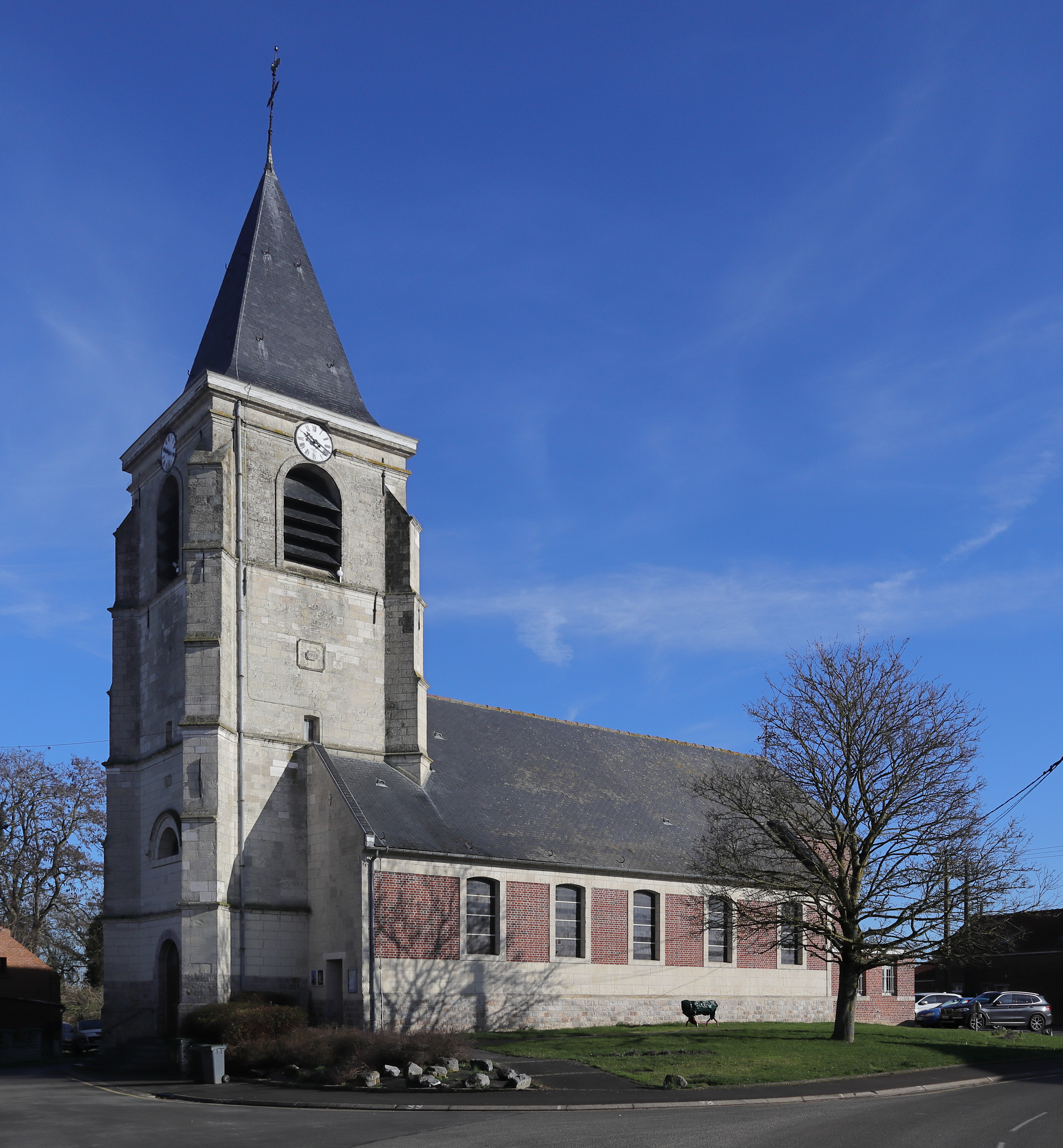
- The church in Hem-Lenglet

- Coat of arms
- Location of Hem-Lenglet
- Location within France Location within Hauts-de-France
- Coordinates: 50°15′31″N 3°13′45″E
- Country: France
- Region: Hauts-de-France
- Department: Nord
- Arrondissement: Cambrai
- Canton: Cambrai
- Intercommunality: CA Cambrai

Government
  - Mayor (2020–2026): Yvette Blanchard-Roussez
- Area^{1}: 4.94 km^{2} (1.91 sq mi)
- Elevation: 37 m (121 ft)
- Highest elevation: 60 m (200 ft)
- Lowest elevation: 32 m (105 ft)
- Population (2023): 565
  - Density: 114/km^{2} (296/sq mi)
- Time zone: UTC+01:00 (CET)
  - Summer (DST): UTC+02:00 (CEST)
- INSEE/Postal code: 59300 /59247
- ^{1} French Land Register data, which excludes lakes, ponds, glaciers > 1 km^{2} (0.386 sq mi or 247 acres) and river estuaries.

Hem-Lenglet is a commune in the Nord department in northern France.

== Heraldry ==
Arms of Hem-Lenglet	The arms of Hem-Lenglet are blazoned : Azure, an inescutcheon argent, overall a bend engrailed gules.

== See also ==
- Communes of the Nord department
