= Aubencheul-au-Bac =

- Commune
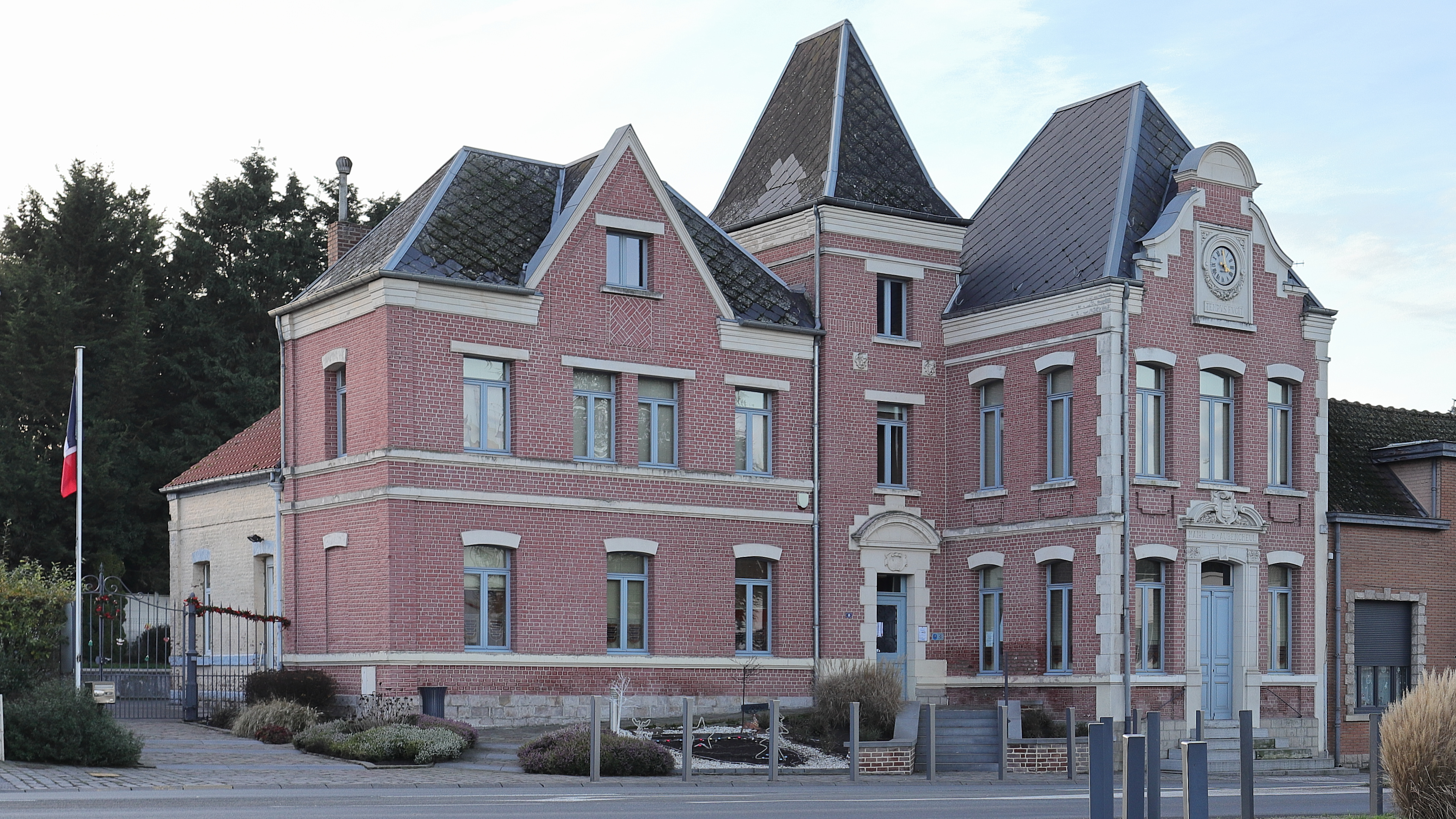
- The town hall in Aubencheul-au-Bac

- Coat of arms
- Location of Aubencheul-au-Bac
- Location within France Location within Hauts-de-France
- Coordinates: 50°15′27″N 3°09′38″E
- Country: France
- Region: Hauts-de-France
- Department: Nord
- Arrondissement: Cambrai
- Canton: Cambrai
- Intercommunality: CA Cambrai

Government
  - Mayor (2020–2026): Michel Prettre
- Area^{1}: 3.2 km^{2} (1.2 sq mi)
- Highest elevation: 79 m (259 ft)
- Lowest elevation: 33 m (108 ft)
- Population (2023): 549
  - Density: 170/km^{2} (440/sq mi)
- Time zone: UTC+01:00 (CET)
  - Summer (DST): UTC+02:00 (CEST)
- INSEE/Postal code: 59023 /59265
- ^{1} French Land Register data, which excludes lakes, ponds, glaciers > 1 km^{2} (0.386 sq mi or 247 acres) and river estuaries.

Aubencheul-au-Bac (French pronunciation: [obɑ̃ʃœl o bak]) is a commune in the Nord department in northern France.

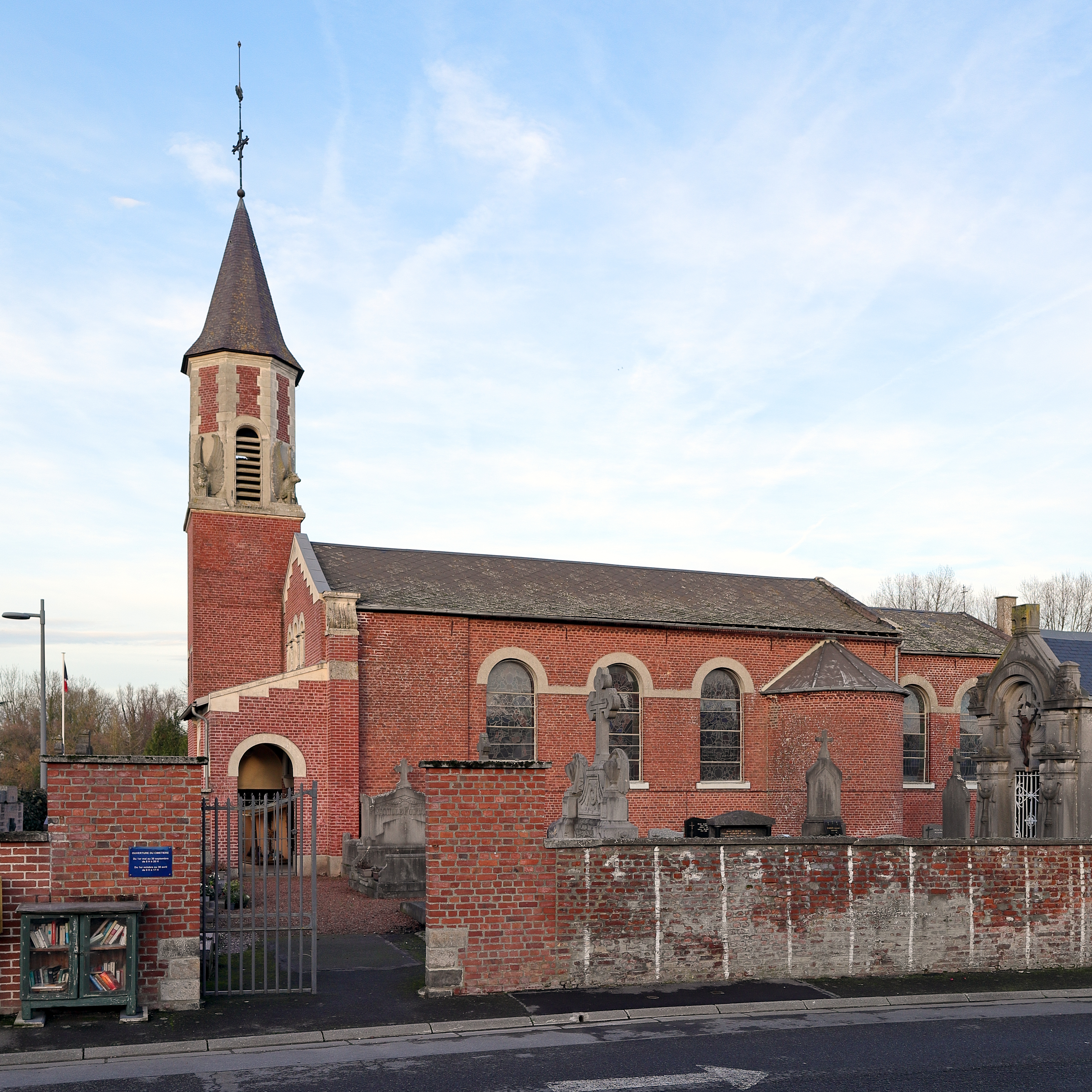
The church

== Population ==
Historical population
Year	Pop.	±% p.a.
1968	367	—
1975	396	+1.09%
1982	440	+1.52%
1990	516	+2.01%
1999	480	−0.80%
2007	505	+0.64%
2012	473	−1.30%
2017	535	+2.49%
2023	549	+0.43%
Source: INSEE

== Heraldry ==
Arms of Aubencheul-au-Bac	The arms of Aubencheul-au-Bac are blazoned : Gules, 2 fesses within and conjoined to a bordure Or.

== See also ==
- Communes of the Nord department
