= Arrondissement of Cambrai =

Coordinates: 50.17°N 3.23°E

Cambrai
- Arrondissement
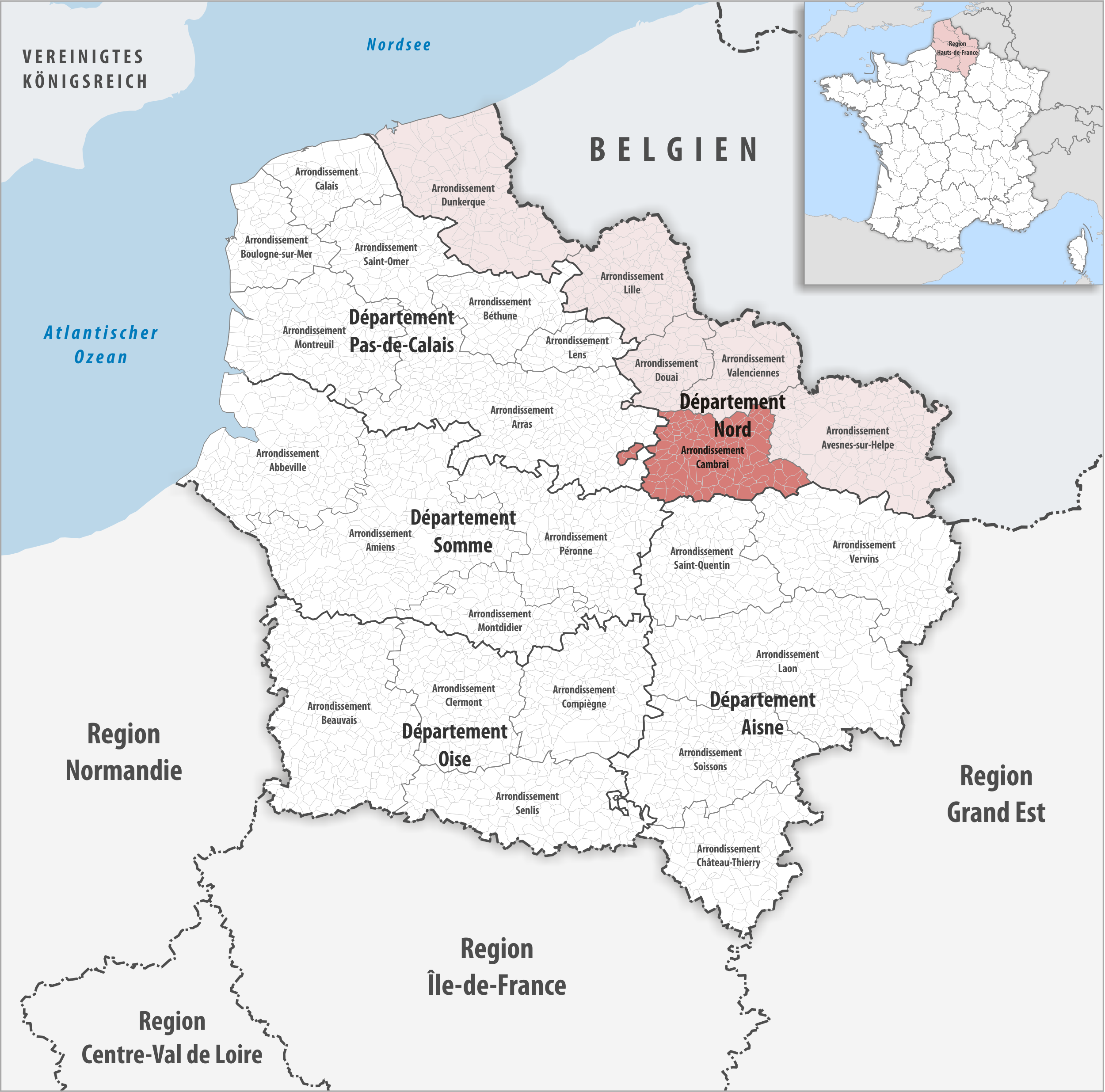
- Location within the region Hauts-de-France
- Country: France
- Region: Hauts-de-France
- Department: Nord
- No. of communes: {{{nbcomm}}}
- Area: 901.6 km^{2} (348.1 sq mi)
- Population (2023): 157,460
  - Density: 174.6/km^{2} (452.3/sq mi)
- INSEE code: 592

The arrondissement of Cambrai is an arrondissement of France in the Nord department in the Hauts-de-France region. It has 116 communes. Its population is 158,753 (2021), and its area is 901.6 km^{2} (348.1 sq mi).

== Composition ==
The communes of the arrondissement of Cambrai, and their INSEE codes, are:

1. Abancourt (59001)
2. Anneux (59010)
3. Aubencheul-au-Bac (59023)
4. Avesnes-les-Aubert (59037)
5. Awoingt (59039)
6. Banteux (59047)
7. Bantigny (59048)
8. Bantouzelle (59049)
9. Bazuel (59055)
10. Beaumont-en-Cambrésis (59059)
11. Beaurain (59060)
12. Beauvois-en-Cambrésis (59063)
13. Bermerain (59069)
14. Bertry (59074)
15. Béthencourt (59075)
16. Bévillers (59081)
17. Blécourt (59085)
18. Boursies (59097)
19. Boussières-en-Cambrésis (59102)
20. Briastre (59108)
21. Busigny (59118)
22. Cagnoncles (59121)
23. Cambrai (59122)
24. Cantaing-sur-Escaut (59125)
25. Capelle (59127)
26. Carnières (59132)
27. Le Cateau-Cambrésis (59136)
28. Catillon-sur-Sambre (59137)
29. Cattenières (59138)
30. Caudry (59139)
31. Caullery (59140)
32. Cauroir (59141)
33. Clary (59149)
34. Crèvecœur-sur-l'Escaut (59161)
35. Cuvillers (59167)
36. Dehéries (59171)
37. Doignies (59176)
38. Élincourt (59191)
39. Escarmain (59204)
40. Escaudœuvres (59206)
41. Esnes (59209)
42. Estourmel (59213)
43. Estrun (59219)
44. Eswars (59216)
45. Flesquières (59236)
46. Fontaine-au-Pire (59243)
47. Fontaine-Notre-Dame (59244)
48. Fressies (59255)
49. Gonnelieu (59267)
50. Gouzeaucourt (59269)
51. La Groise (59274)
52. Haucourt-en-Cambrésis (59287)
53. Haussy (59289)
54. Haynecourt (59294)
55. Hem-Lenglet (59300)
56. Honnechy (59311)
57. Honnecourt-sur-Escaut (59312)
58. Inchy (59321)
59. Iwuy (59322)
60. Lesdain (59341)
61. Ligny-en-Cambrésis (59349)
62. Malincourt (59372)
63. Marcoing (59377)
64. Maretz (59382)
65. Masnières (59389)
66. Maurois (59394)
67. Mazinghien (59395)
68. Mœuvres (59405)
69. Montay (59412)
70. Montigny-en-Cambrésis (59413)
71. Montrécourt (59415)
72. Naves (59422)
73. Neuville-Saint-Rémy (59428)
74. Neuvilly (59430)
75. Niergnies (59432)
76. Noyelles-sur-Escaut (59438)
77. Ors (59450)
78. Paillencourt (59455)
79. Pommereuil (59465)
80. Proville (59476)
81. Quiévy (59485)
82. Raillencourt-Sainte-Olle (59488)
83. Ramillies (59492)
84. Rejet-de-Beaulieu (59496)
85. Reumont (59498)
86. Ribécourt-la-Tour (59500)
87. Rieux-en-Cambrésis (59502)
88. Romeries (59506)
89. Les Rues-des-Vignes (59517)
90. Rumilly-en-Cambrésis (59520)
91. Sailly-lez-Cambrai (59521)
92. Saint-Aubert (59528)
93. Saint-Benin (59531)
94. Saint-Hilaire-lez-Cambrai (59533)
95. Saint-Martin-sur-Écaillon (59537)
96. Saint-Python (59541)
97. Saint-Souplet (59545)
98. Saint-Vaast-en-Cambrésis (59547)
99. Sancourt (59552)
100. Saulzoir (59558)
101. Séranvillers-Forenville (59567)
102. Solesmes (59571)
103. Sommaing (59575)
104. Thun-l'Évêque (59593)
105. Thun-Saint-Martin (59595)
106. Tilloy-lez-Cambrai (59597)
107. Troisvilles (59604)
108. Vendegies-sur-Écaillon (59608)
109. Vertain (59612)
110. Viesly (59614)
111. Villers-en-Cauchies (59622)
112. Villers-Guislain (59623)
113. Villers-Outréaux (59624)
114. Villers-Plouich (59625)
115. Walincourt-Selvigny (59631)
116. Wambaix (59635)

== History ==
The arrondissement of Cambrai was created in 1800.

As a result of the reorganisation of the cantons of France which came into effect in 2015, the borders of the cantons are no longer related to the borders of the arrondissements. The cantons of the arrondissement of Cambrai were, as of January 2015:

1. Cambrai-Est
2. Cambrai-Ouest
3. Carnières
4. Le Cateau-Cambrésis
5. Clary
6. Marcoing
7. Solesmes
