= Proville =

- Commune
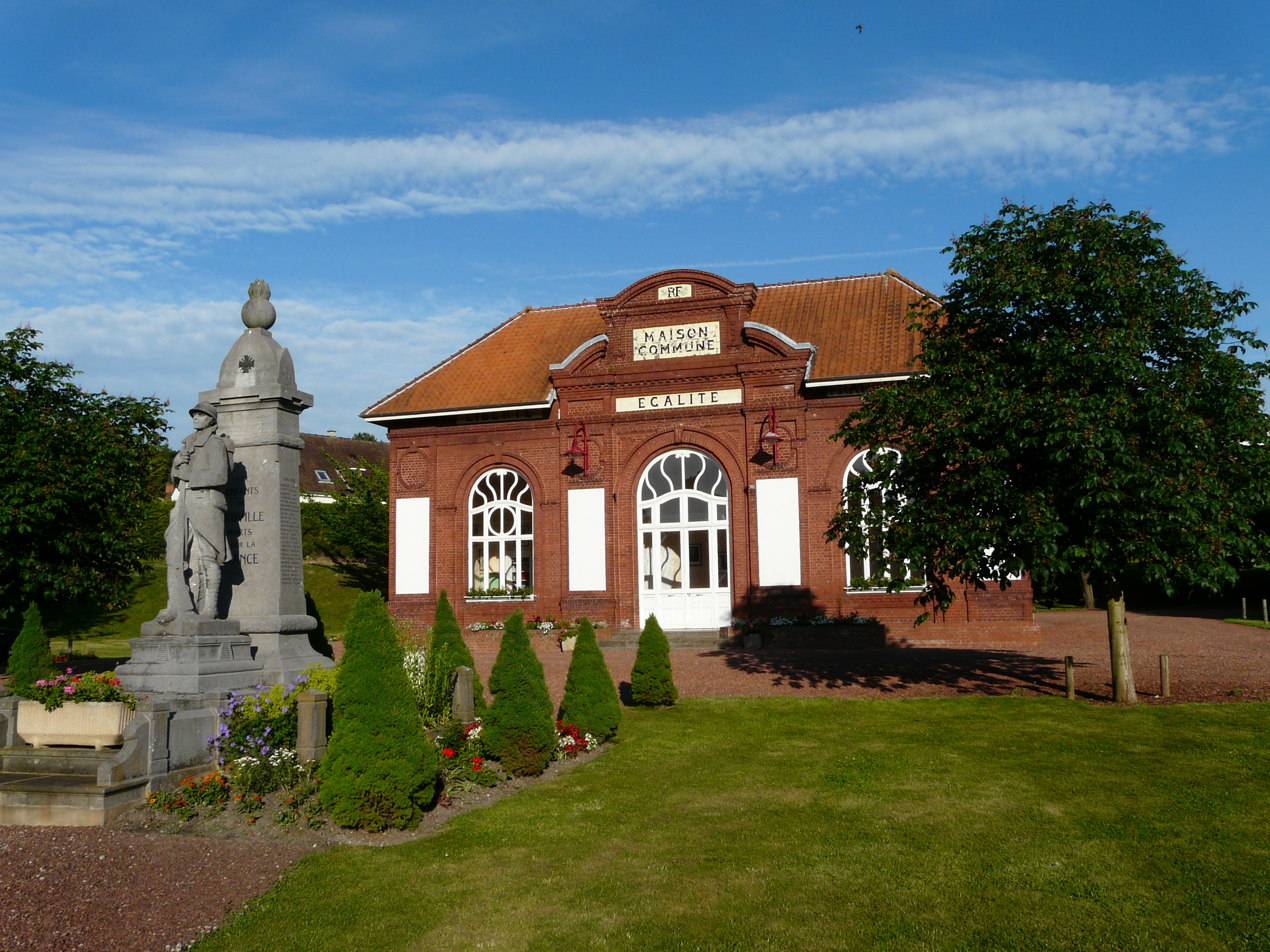
- The town hall in Proville

- Coat of arms
- Location of Proville
- Location within France Location within Hauts-de-France
- Coordinates: 50°09′40″N 3°12′22″E
- Country: France
- Region: Hauts-de-France
- Department: Nord
- Arrondissement: Cambrai
- Canton: Cambrai
- Intercommunality: CA Cambrai

Government
  - Mayor (2021–2026): Guy Coquelle
- Area^{1}: 6.31 km^{2} (2.44 sq mi)
- Elevation: 5 m (16 ft)
- Highest elevation: 87 m (285 ft)
- Lowest elevation: 42 m (138 ft)
- Population (2023): 3,206
  - Density: 508/km^{2} (1,320/sq mi)
- Time zone: UTC+01:00 (CET)
  - Summer (DST): UTC+02:00 (CEST)
- INSEE/Postal code: 59476 /59267
- ^{1} French Land Register data, which excludes lakes, ponds, glaciers > 1 km^{2} (0.386 sq mi or 247 acres) and river estuaries.

Proville (French pronunciation: [pʁɔvil]) is a commune in the Nord department in northern France.

== Population ==
Historical population
Year	Pop.	±% p.a.
1968	915	—
1975	2,238	+13.63%
1982	3,215	+5.31%
1990	3,655	+1.62%
1999	3,472	−0.57%
2007	3,475	+0.01%
2012	3,237	−1.41%
2017	3,163	−0.46%
2023	3,206	+0.23%
Source: INSEE

== Heraldry ==
Arms of Proville	The arms of Proville are blazoned : Gules, a crescent argent.

== See also ==
- Communes of the Nord department
