= Bantigny =

- Commune
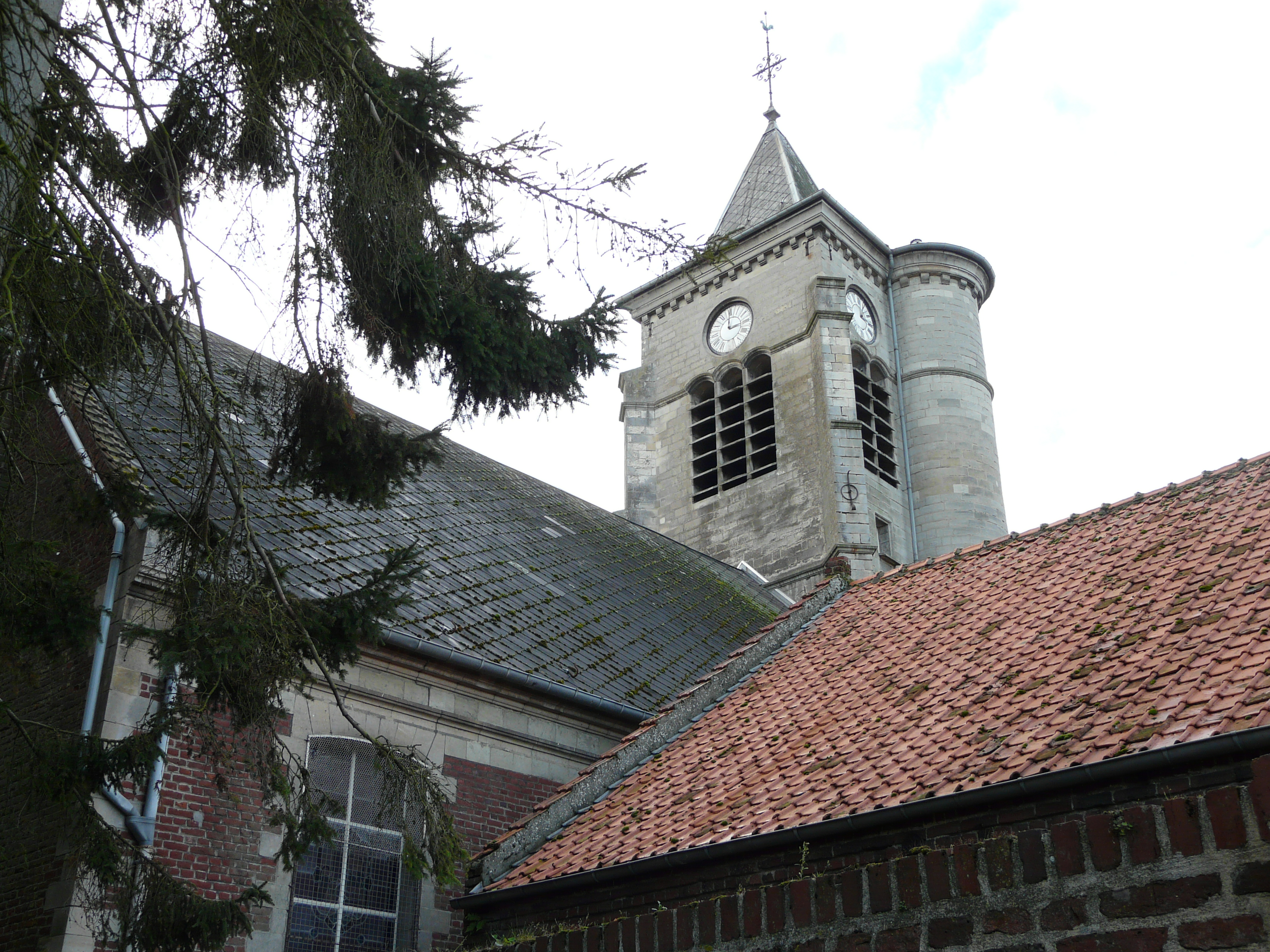
- The church in Bantigny

- Coat of arms
- Location of Bantigny
- Location within France Location within Hauts-de-France
- Coordinates: 50°13′48″N 3°13′51″E
- Country: France
- Region: Hauts-de-France
- Department: Nord
- Arrondissement: Cambrai
- Canton: Cambrai
- Intercommunality: CA Cambrai

Government
  - Mayor (2020–2026): Yves Marécaille
- Area^{1}: 3.17 km^{2} (1.22 sq mi)
- Elevation: 48 m (157 ft)
- Highest elevation: 65 m (213 ft)
- Lowest elevation: 39 m (128 ft)
- Population (2023): 494
  - Density: 156/km^{2} (404/sq mi)
- Time zone: UTC+01:00 (CET)
  - Summer (DST): UTC+02:00 (CEST)
- INSEE/Postal code: 59048 /59554
- ^{1} French Land Register data, which excludes lakes, ponds, glaciers > 1 km^{2} (0.386 sq mi or 247 acres) and river estuaries.

Bantigny (French pronunciation: [bɑ̃tiɲi]) is a commune in the Nord department in northern France.

== Population ==
Historical population
Year	Pop.	±% p.a.
1968	264	—
1975	250	−0.78%
1982	440	+8.41%
1990	477	+1.01%
1999	465	−0.28%
2007	462	−0.08%
2012	482	+0.85%
2017	510	+1.14%
2023	494	−0.53%
Source: INSEE

== Heraldry ==
Arms of Bantigny	The arms of Bantigny are blazoned : Gules, on a bend argent, 3 martlets sable.

== See also ==
- Communes of the Nord department
