= Doignies =

- Commune
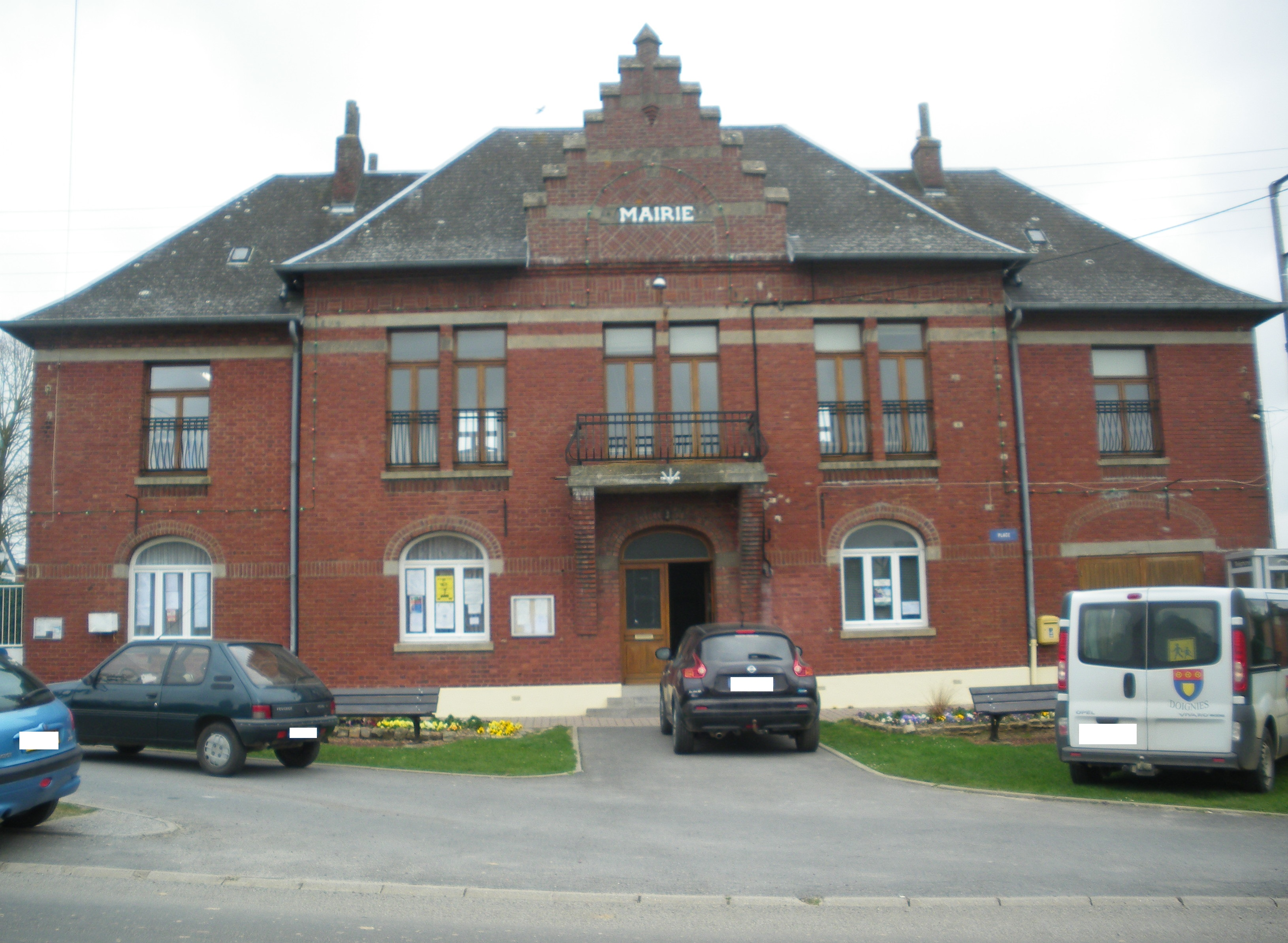
- The town hall in Doignies

- Coat of arms
- Location of Doignies
- Location within France Location within Hauts-de-France
- Coordinates: 50°07′45″N 3°00′54″E
- Country: France
- Region: Hauts-de-France
- Department: Nord
- Arrondissement: Cambrai
- Canton: Cambrai
- Intercommunality: CA Cambrai

Government
  - Mayor (2020–2026): Pascal Mompach
- Area^{1}: 7.4 km^{2} (2.9 sq mi)
- Elevation: 105 m (344 ft)
- Highest elevation: 121 m (397 ft)
- Lowest elevation: 78 m (256 ft)
- Population (2023): 325
  - Density: 44/km^{2} (110/sq mi)
- Time zone: UTC+01:00 (CET)
  - Summer (DST): UTC+02:00 (CEST)
- INSEE/Postal code: 59176 /59400
- ^{1} French Land Register data, which excludes lakes, ponds, glaciers > 1 km^{2} (0.386 sq mi or 247 acres) and river estuaries.

Doignies (French pronunciation: [dwaɲi]) is a commune in the Nord department in northern France.

== Heraldry ==
Arms of Doignies	The arms of Doignies are blazoned : Azure, an inescutcheon Or, and on a chief gules, 3 buckles Or.

== See also ==
- Communes of the Nord department
