= Esnes =

- Commune
- The castle in Esnes

- Coat of arms
- Location of Esnes
- Location within France Location within Hauts-de-France
- Coordinates: 50°06′08″N 3°18′43″E
- Country: France
- Region: Hauts-de-France
- Department: Nord
- Arrondissement: Cambrai
- Canton: Le Cateau-Cambrésis
- Intercommunality: CA Cambrai

Government
  - Mayor (2023–2026): Michel Komar
- Area^{1}: 14.44 km^{2} (5.58 sq mi)
- Highest elevation: 139 m (456 ft)
- Lowest elevation: 71 m (233 ft)
- Population (2023): 656
  - Density: 45.4/km^{2} (118/sq mi)
- Time zone: UTC+01:00 (CET)
  - Summer (DST): UTC+02:00 (CEST)
- INSEE/Postal code: 59209 /59127
- ^{1} French Land Register data, which excludes lakes, ponds, glaciers > 1 km^{2} (0.386 sq mi or 247 acres) and river estuaries.

Esnes (French pronunciation: [ɛn]) is a commune in the Nord department in northern France.

== Heraldry ==
Arms of Esnes	The arms of Esnes are blazoned : Sable, 10 lozenges conjoined argent 3,3,3 and 1. (Esnes and Forenville use the same arms.)

== Monuments ==
- Castle

== See also ==
- Communes of the Nord department
