= Sancourt, Nord =

Sancourt
- Commune
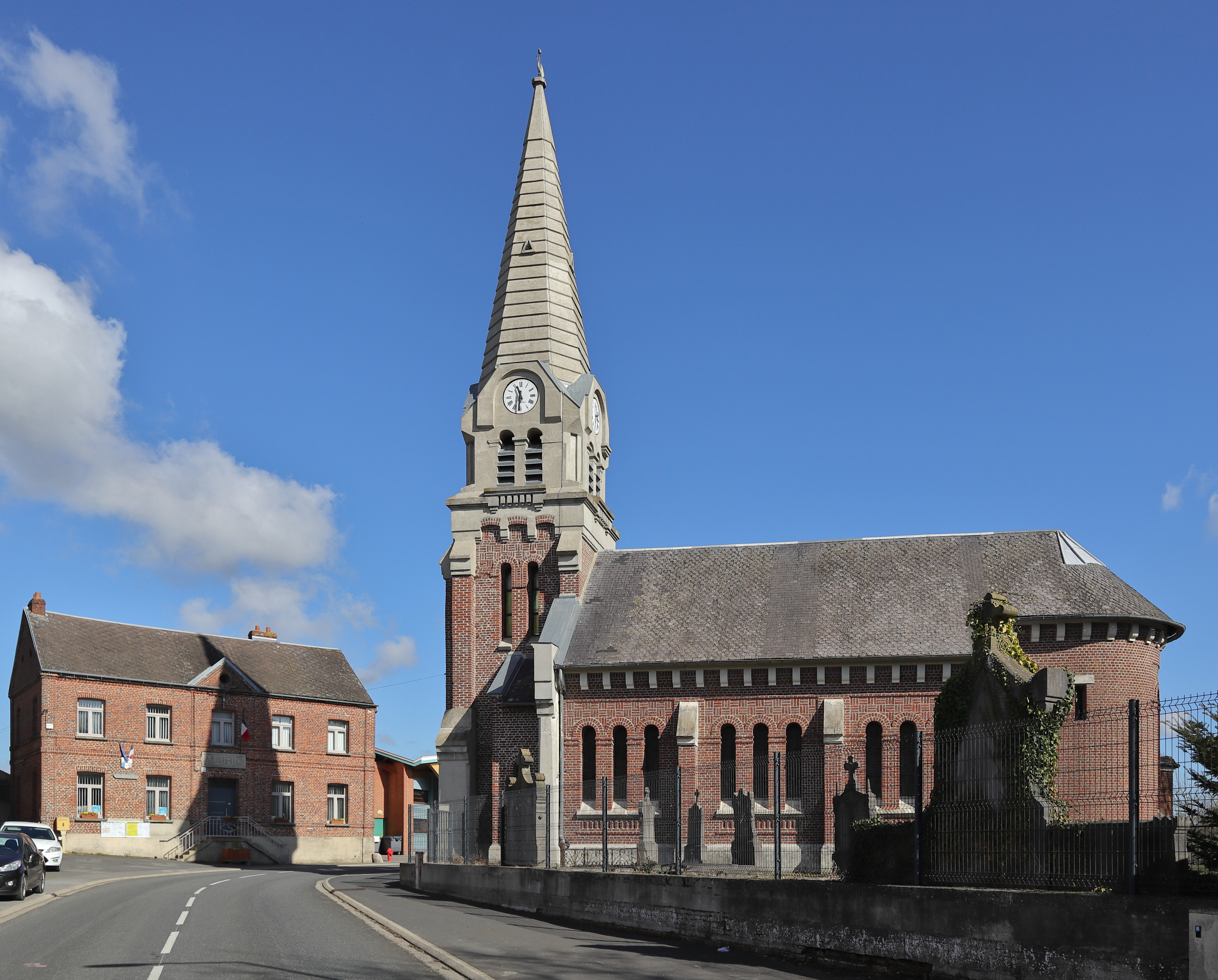
- The town hall and church in Sancourt

- Coat of arms
- Location of Sancourt
- Location within France Location within Hauts-de-France
- Coordinates: 50°12′57″N 3°11′41″E
- Country: France
- Region: Hauts-de-France
- Department: Nord
- Arrondissement: Cambrai
- Canton: Cambrai
- Intercommunality: CA Cambrai

Government
  - Mayor (2020–2026): Claude Leclercq
- Area^{1}: 3.88 km^{2} (1.50 sq mi)
- Elevation: 57 m (187 ft)
- Highest elevation: 76 m (249 ft)
- Lowest elevation: 53 m (174 ft)
- Population (2023): 190
  - Density: 49/km^{2} (130/sq mi)
- Time zone: UTC+01:00 (CET)
  - Summer (DST): UTC+02:00 (CEST)
- INSEE/Postal code: 59552 /59268
- ^{1} French Land Register data, which excludes lakes, ponds, glaciers > 1 km^{2} (0.386 sq mi or 247 acres) and river estuaries.

Sancourt (French pronunciation: [sɑ̃kuʁ]) is a commune in the Nord department in northern France.

== Heraldry ==
Arms of Sancourt	The arms of Sancourt are blazoned : Azure, a lion Or.

== See also ==
- Communes of the Nord department
