= Thun-Saint-Martin =

- Commune
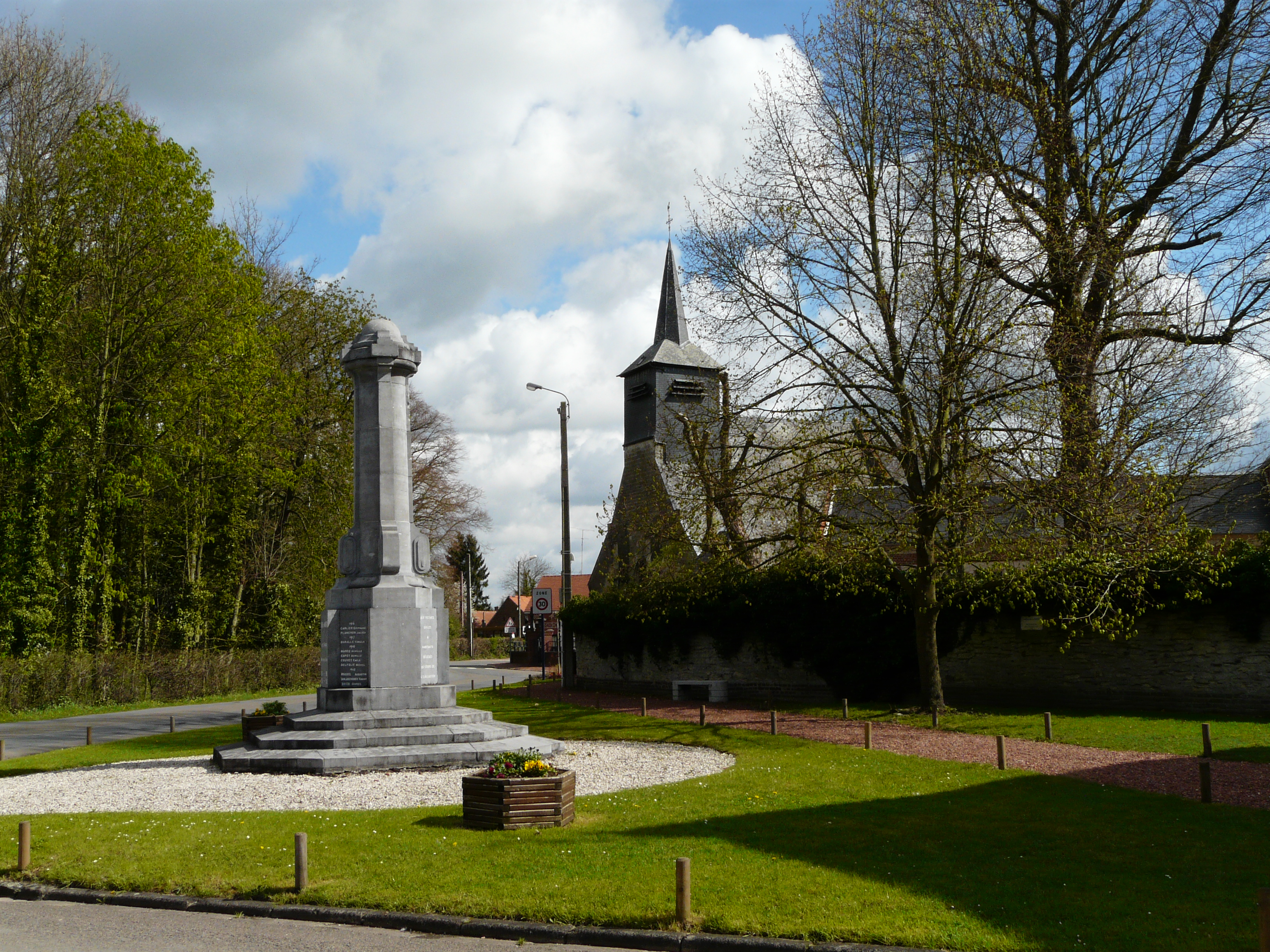
- The war memorial and church in Thun-Saint-Martin

- Coat of arms
- Location of Thun-Saint-Martin
- Location within France Location within Hauts-de-France
- Coordinates: 50°13′31″N 3°17′49″E
- Country: France
- Region: Hauts-de-France
- Department: Nord
- Arrondissement: Cambrai
- Canton: Cambrai
- Intercommunality: CA Cambrai

Government
  - Mayor (2023–2026): Marie-Claude Urbain
- Area^{1}: 6.03 km^{2} (2.33 sq mi)
- Elevation: 38 m (125 ft)
- Highest elevation: 72 m (236 ft)
- Lowest elevation: 36 m (118 ft)
- Population (2023): 543
  - Density: 90.0/km^{2} (233/sq mi)
- Time zone: UTC+01:00 (CET)
  - Summer (DST): UTC+02:00 (CEST)
- INSEE/Postal code: 59595 /59141
- ^{1} French Land Register data, which excludes lakes, ponds, glaciers > 1 km^{2} (0.386 sq mi or 247 acres) and river estuaries.

Thun-Saint-Martin (French pronunciation: [tœ̃ sɛ̃ maʁtɛ̃]) is a commune in the Nord department in northern France.

== Heraldry ==
Arms of Thun-Saint-Martin	The arms of Thun-Saint-Martin are blazoned : Argent, a lion gules antiquely crowned Or, between 6 escallops azure.

== Sister cities ==
- Kincardine O'Neil, Scotland

== See also ==
- Communes of the Nord department
