= Paillencourt =

- Commune
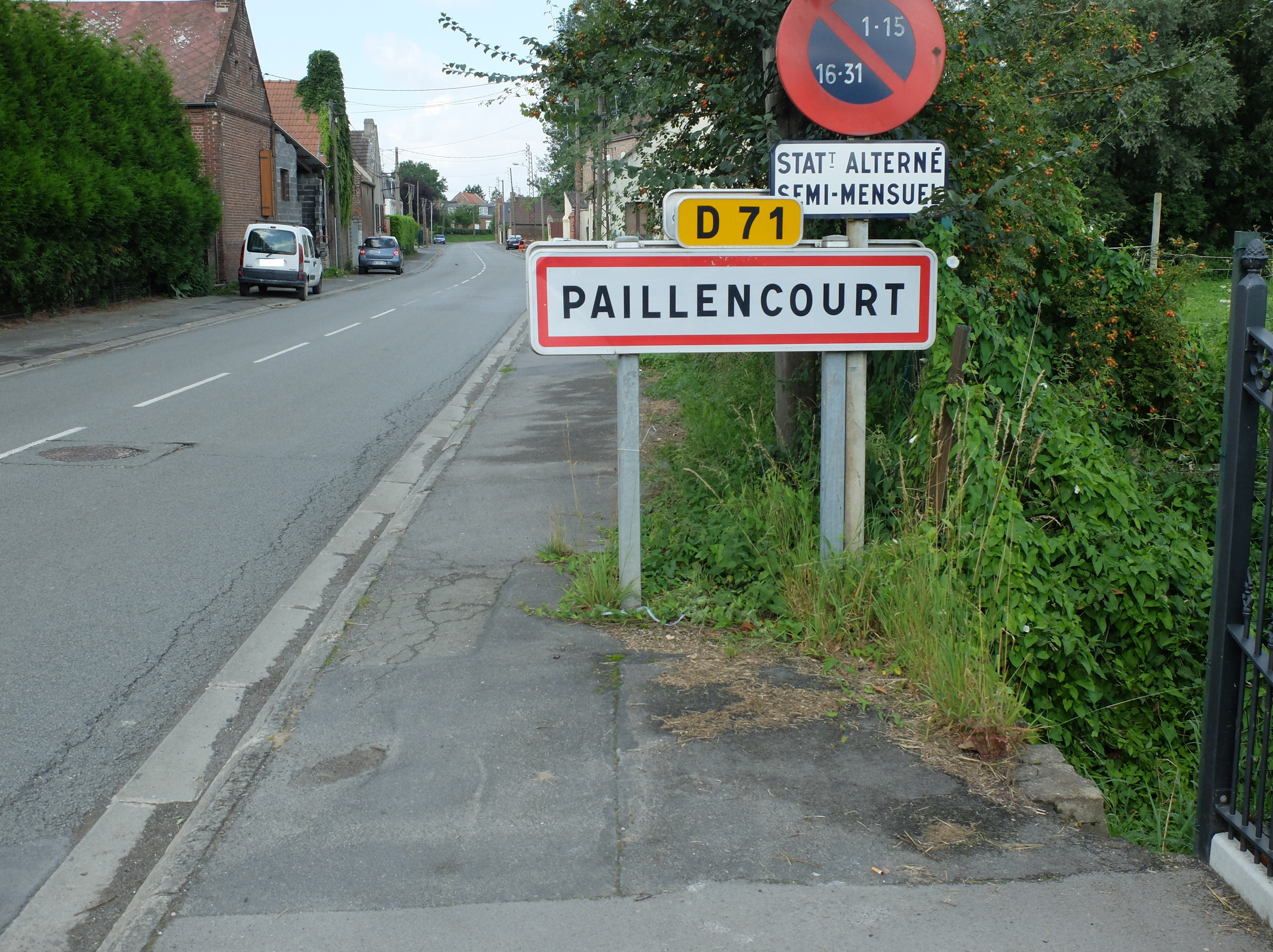
- The road into Paillencourt

- Coat of arms
- Location of Paillencourt
- Location within France Location within Hauts-de-France
- Coordinates: 50°14′54″N 3°16′31″E
- Country: France
- Region: Hauts-de-France
- Department: Nord
- Arrondissement: Cambrai
- Canton: Cambrai
- Intercommunality: CA Cambrai

Government
  - Mayor (2020–2026): Fabrice Lefebvre
- Area^{1}: 7.56 km^{2} (2.92 sq mi)
- Elevation: 40 m (130 ft)
- Highest elevation: 73 m (240 ft)
- Lowest elevation: 32 m (105 ft)
- Population (2023): 1,030
  - Density: 136/km^{2} (353/sq mi)
- Time zone: UTC+01:00 (CET)
  - Summer (DST): UTC+02:00 (CEST)
- INSEE/Postal code: 59455 /59295
- ^{1} French Land Register data, which excludes lakes, ponds, glaciers > 1 km^{2} (0.386 sq mi or 247 acres) and river estuaries.

Paillencourt (French pronunciation: [pajɑ̃kuʁ]) is a commune in the Nord department in northern France.

== Heraldry ==
Arms of Paillencourt	The arms of Paillencourt are blazoned : Gules, 2 leopards argent within a bordure Or.

== See also ==
- Communes of the Nord department
