= Fontaine-Notre-Dame, Nord =

Fontaine-Notre-Dame
- Commune
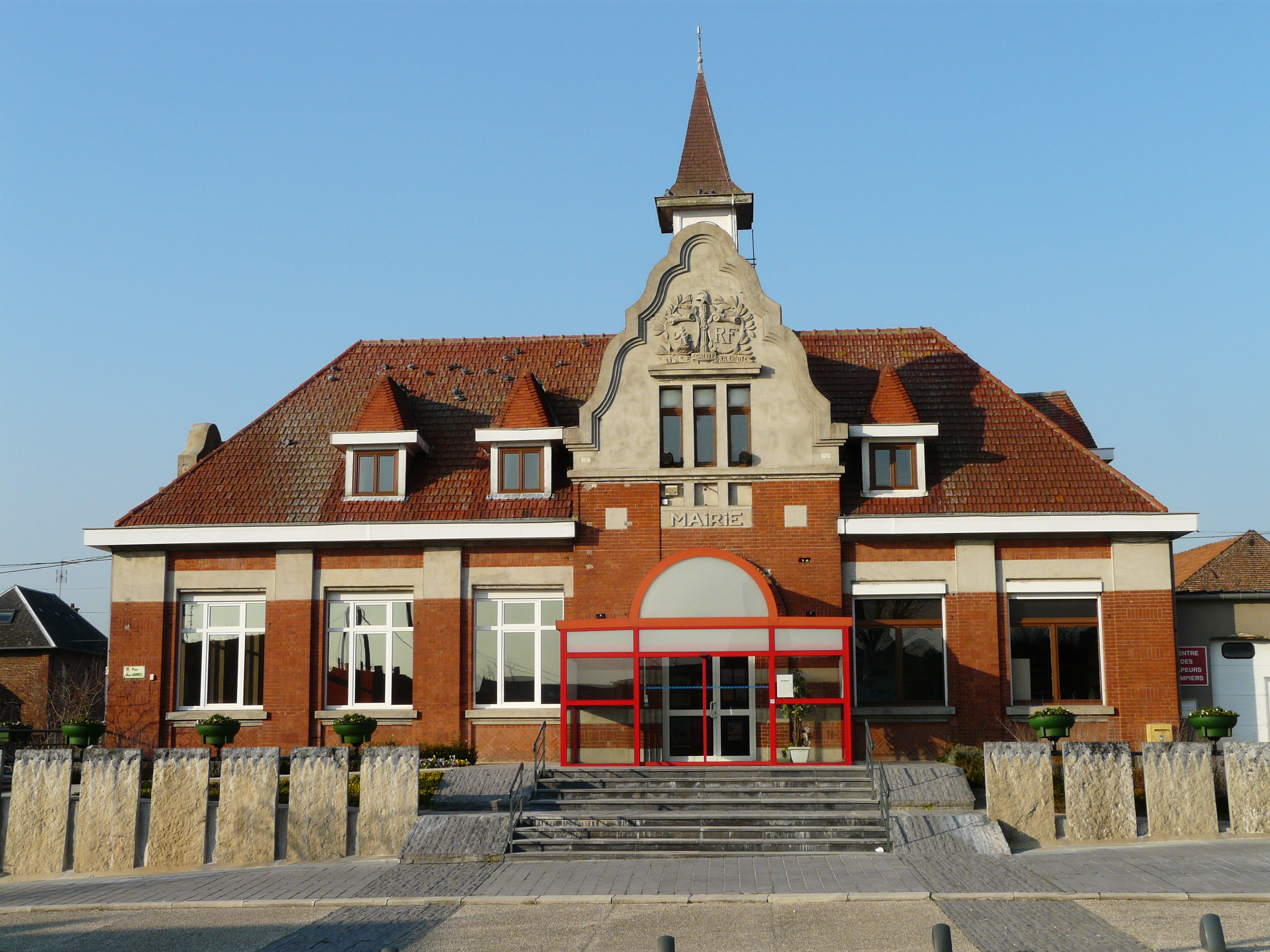
- The town hall in Fontaine-Notre-Dame

- Coat of arms
- Location of Fontaine-Notre-Dame
- Location within France Location within Hauts-de-France
- Coordinates: 50°10′04″N 3°09′38″E
- Country: France
- Region: Hauts-de-France
- Department: Nord
- Arrondissement: Cambrai
- Canton: Cambrai
- Intercommunality: CA Cambrai

Government
  - Mayor (2020–2026): Bruno Ivanec
- Area^{1}: 10.52 km^{2} (4.06 sq mi)
- Elevation: 75 m (246 ft)
- Highest elevation: 117 m (384 ft)
- Lowest elevation: 44 m (144 ft)
- Population (2023): 1,754
  - Density: 166.7/km^{2} (431.8/sq mi)
- Time zone: UTC+01:00 (CET)
  - Summer (DST): UTC+02:00 (CEST)
- INSEE/Postal code: 59244 /59400
- ^{1} French Land Register data, which excludes lakes, ponds, glaciers > 1 km^{2} (0.386 sq mi or 247 acres) and river estuaries.

Fontaine-Notre-Dame is a commune in the Nord department in northern France.

== Heraldry ==
Arms of Fontaine-Notre-Dame	The arms of Fontaine-Notre-Dame are blazoned : Or, a madonna proper holding a Baby Jesus in her left arm, vested gules and azure, seated on a throne sable.

== Fontaine-Notre-Dame in World War I ==
Fontaine-Notre-Dame was the scene of intense fighting during the Battle of Cambrai in World War I.

The battle started on 20 November 1917 when the British army made significant advances (4 miles) by virtue of its extensive use of tanks (300) for the first time. Fontaine-Notre-Dame was initially captured but, as the British advance stalled in the following days, soon lost due to "a vigorous [German] counterattack".

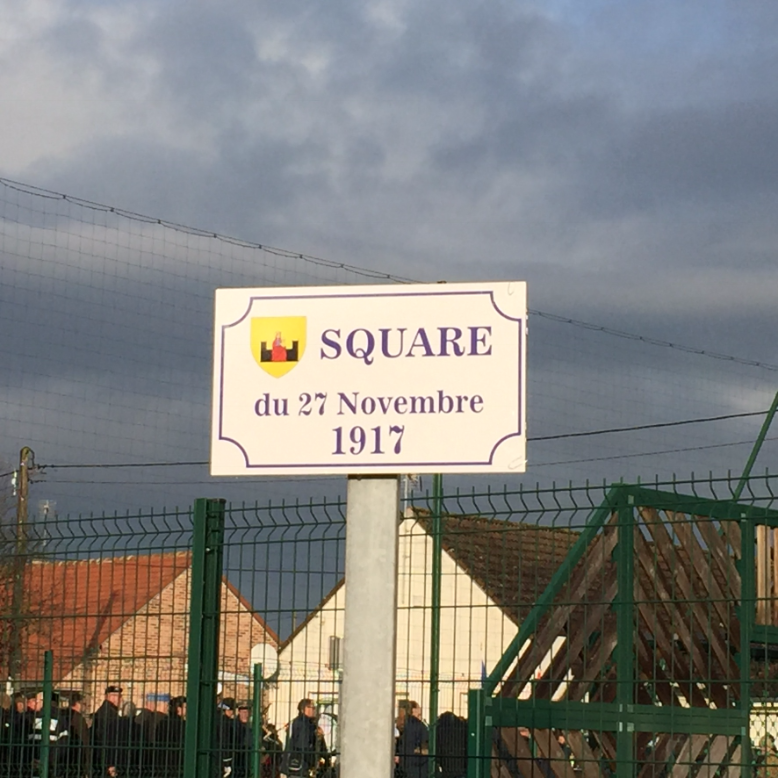
Sign marking Square du 27 Novembre 1917 on the site of the old railway station at its official opening on 25 November 2017

General Julian Byng decided to make one more effort on 27 November to try to recapture Fontaine-Notre-Dame and the neighbouring Bourlon Wood, despite the reservations of divisional commander Major-General Fielding who described the idea as, "a dangerous and impracticable undertaking for which there could be no kind of justification."

The attack commenced at 6.20 a.m. on 27 November 1917 with soldiers of the 3rd Battalion Grenadier Guards heading for Fontaine-Notre-Dame supported by just 14 (late) tanks and no heavy artillery barrage. The machine gun fire was heavier than expected: Harold Dearden, a doctor attached to the Grenadiers, describing it as sounding like, "one continuous scream". Once in Fontaine-Notre-Dame, there followed intense street fighting, one soldier describing the machine gun fire in the main street as "pouring with the volume of water from a fire hose." Nevertheless, by between 7.30 a.m.and 8.30 a.m. most of Fontaine-Notre-Dame belonged to the Guards including the church and the area around railway station.

Having sustained heavy losses, however, and in the face of a German counter-attack starting at 10.00 a.m. the British were forced to retreat to their starting lines. Of the 680 soldiers and 19 officers who attacked Fontaine-Notre-Dame, only 135 soldiers and 6 officers returned. Amongst the dead was Gavin Bowes-Lyon, a first cousin of the future Queen Elizabeth, consort to George VI. Dearden wrote in his diary a few days later, "I have never been more wretched, tired and hungry and dispirited, and at the same time feeling we had been let down somehow by somebody."

== See also ==
- Communes of the Nord department
