= Villers-en-Cauchies =

- Commune
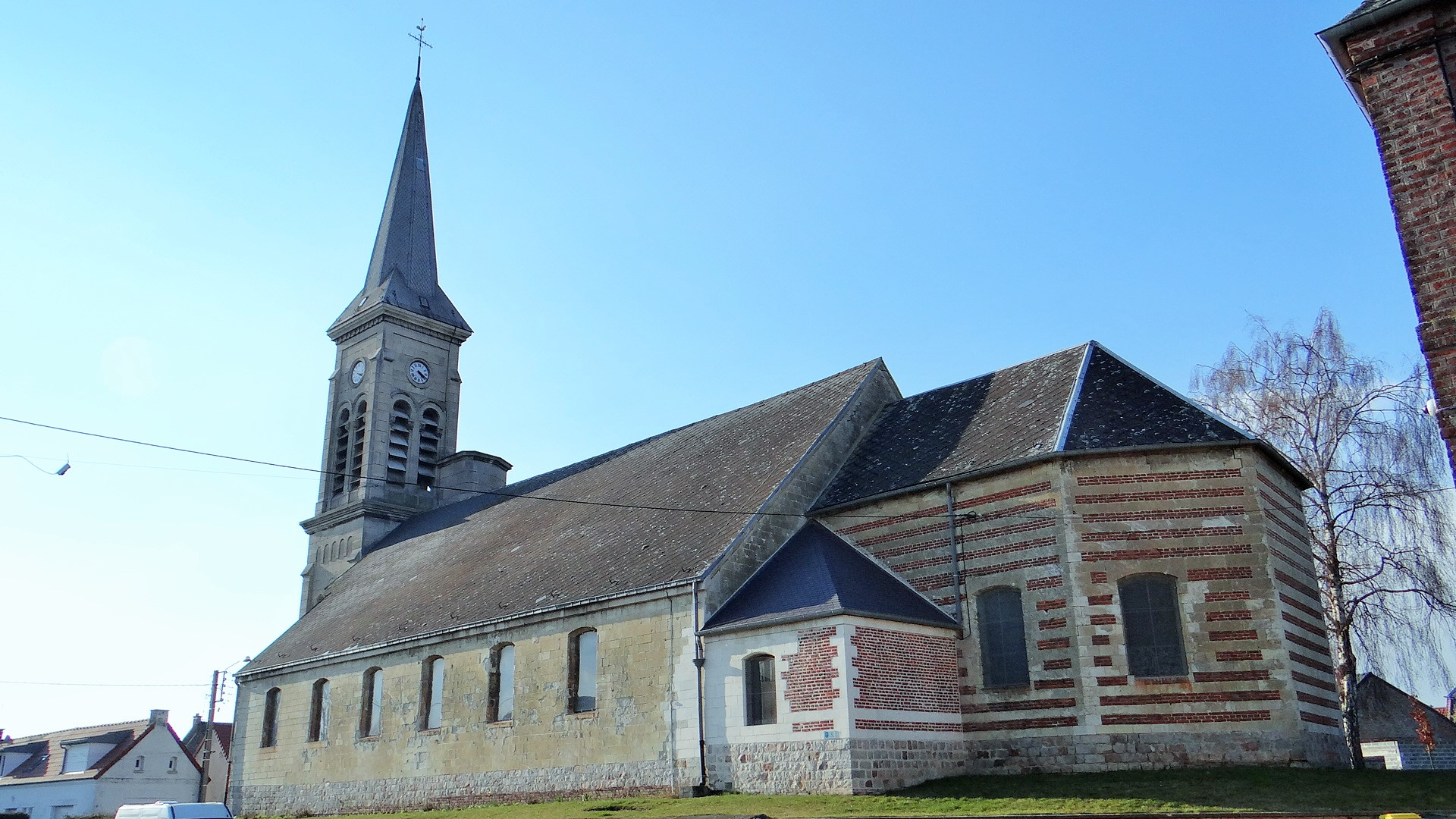
- The church in Villers-en-Cauchies

- Coat of arms
- Location of Villers-en-Cauchies
- Location within France Location within Hauts-de-France
- Coordinates: 50°13′36″N 3°24′06″E
- Country: France
- Region: Hauts-de-France
- Department: Nord
- Arrondissement: Cambrai
- Canton: Caudry
- Intercommunality: CA Cambrai

Government
  - Mayor (2020–2026): Pascal Duez
- Area^{1}: 8.94 km^{2} (3.45 sq mi)
- Elevation: 87 m (285 ft)
- Highest elevation: 92 m (302 ft)
- Lowest elevation: 56 m (184 ft)
- Population (2023): 1,151
  - Density: 129/km^{2} (333/sq mi)
- Time zone: UTC+01:00 (CET)
  - Summer (DST): UTC+02:00 (CEST)
- INSEE/Postal code: 59622 /59188
- ^{1} French Land Register data, which excludes lakes, ponds, glaciers > 1 km^{2} (0.386 sq mi or 247 acres) and river estuaries.

Villers-en-Cauchies (French pronunciation: [vilɛʁ ɑ̃ koʃi]) is a commune in the Nord department in northern France.

== Heraldry ==
| Arms of Villers-en-Cauchies | The arms of Villers-en-Cauchies are blazoned : Azure, a chevron argent between 3 covered cups Or. |

== See also ==
- Communes of the Nord department
