= Communauté d'agglomération de Cambrai =

Cambrai
- Communauté d'agglomération
- Interactive map of Cambrai
- Coordinates: 50°10′N 03°15′E
- Country: France
- Region: Hauts-de-France
- Department: Nord
- No. of communes: {{{nbcomm}}}
- Established: 2017
- Area: 411.3 km^{2} (158.8 sq mi)
- Population (2019): 81,335
  - Density: 197.8/km^{2} (512.2/sq mi)
- Website: www.agglo-cambrai.fr

Communauté d'agglomération de Cambrai is the communauté d'agglomération, an intercommunal structure, centred on the city of Cambrai. It is located in the Nord department, in the Hauts-de-France region, northern France. Created in 2017, its seat is in Cambrai. Its area is 411.3 km^{2}. Its population was 81,335 in 2019, of which 32,176 in Cambrai proper.

== Composition ==
The communauté d'agglomération consists of the following 55 communes:

1. Abancourt
2. Anneux
3. Aubencheul-au-Bac
4. Awoingt
5. Banteux
6. Bantigny
7. Bantouzelle
8. Blécourt
9. Boursies
10. Cagnoncles
11. Cambrai
12. Cantaing-sur-Escaut
13. Cauroir
14. Crèvecœur-sur-l'Escaut
15. Cuvillers
16. Doignies
17. Escaudœuvres
18. Esnes
19. Estrun
20. Eswars
21. Flesquières
22. Fontaine-Notre-Dame
23. Fressies
24. Gonnelieu
25. Gouzeaucourt
26. Haynecourt
27. Hem-Lenglet
28. Honnecourt-sur-Escaut
29. Iwuy
30. Lesdain
31. Marcoing
32. Masnières
33. Mœuvres
34. Naves
35. Neuville-Saint-Rémy
36. Niergnies
37. Noyelles-sur-Escaut
38. Paillencourt
39. Proville
40. Raillencourt-Sainte-Olle
41. Ramillies
42. Ribécourt-la-Tour
43. Rieux-en-Cambrésis
44. Les Rues-des-Vignes
45. Rumilly-en-Cambrésis
46. Sailly-lez-Cambrai
47. Sancourt
48. Séranvillers-Forenville
49. Thun-l'Évêque
50. Thun-Saint-Martin
51. Tilloy-lez-Cambrai
52. Villers-en-Cauchies
53. Villers-Guislain
54. Villers-Plouich
55. Wambaix
