= Battle of Le Cateau =

Part of the First World War

- Part of the Great Retreat on the Western Front of the First World War
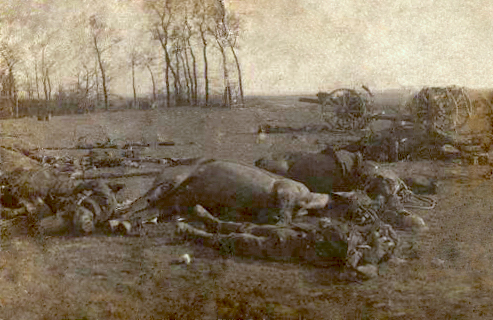
- British dead at the Battle of Le Cateau.
| Date | 26 August 1914 |
| Location | Le Cateau-Cambrésis, France 50°06′15″N 03°32′40″E |
| Result | German victory |

Belligerents
| German Empire | United Kingdom |

Commanders and leaders
| (German Empire) Friedrich Sixt von Armin (German Empire) Georg von der Marwitz | (United Kingdom of Great Britain and Ireland) Sir Horace Smith-Dorrien |

Units involved
| (German Empire) IV Corps (German Empire) Höheres Kavallerie-Kommando 2 | (United Kingdom of Great Britain and Ireland) II Corps |

Strength
| 23 infantry battalions 18 cavalry regiments (9 at half strength); 6 divisional cavalry squadrons 162 guns (27 batteries); 84 machine-guns | 40 infantry battalions 12 cavalry regiments 2 divisional cavalry squadrons 246 guns (41 batteries) c. 80 machine-guns |

Casualties and losses
| 2,900 | 7,812 (700 killed, 2,600 captured); 38 guns |

The Battle of Le Cateau was fought on the Western Front during the First World War on 26 August 1914. The British Expeditionary Force (BEF) and the French Fifth Army had retreated after their defeats at the Battle of Charleroi (21–23 August) and the Battle of Mons (23 August). The British II Corps fought a delaying action at Le Cateau to slow the German pursuit. Most of the BEF was able to continue its retreat to Saint-Quentin.

== Prelude ==
Having retreated from Mons two days earlier, Le Cateau and Mons being 24.8 mi (39.9 km) apart, the British II Corps (General Sir Horace Smith-Dorrien) was exhausted. The corps had become separated from the rest of the BEF because of the unexpected retreat by Sir Douglas Haig, the commander of I Corps, who had fought a rearguard action at Landrecies on 25 August. Following that engagement, where Haig had rallied his troops, revolver in hand, he succumbed to panic, writing to the French High Command about the imminent debacle. He had greatly overestimated German numbers, was "[mentally] completely destroyed" – as described by James Edmonds, Chief of Staff of the 4th Division. Instead of reinforcing Smith-Dorrien at Le Cateau, he retreated further inland, marching for five days.

Ignorant of the manoeuvre of I Corps, Smith-Dorrien intended to continue marching, as mentioned by Wilkinson Bird, Colonel of the Royal Irish Fusiliers. Early on 26 August Smith-Dorrien changed his mind, seeing the exhaustion of his troops and the disorder that could occur should the marching continue. Edmund Allenby, commander of the II Corps' cavalry, claimed that both his men and the horses were "almost finished" and that battle at Le Cateau was inevitable, the enemy being so close. Sir Horace agreed. At 07:00 he received a call from Henry Wilson at BEF HQ, ordering him to continue the retreat; he refused the order, confirming that the men were already fighting.

== Battle ==
On the morning of 26 August, the Germans arrived and attacked II Corps. Unlike the Battle of Mons, where the majority of casualties inflicted by the British were from rifle fire, Le Cateau was an artillery battle with the devastating results that modern quick-firing artillery firing shrapnel shells could have on infantry advancing in the open. The British deployed their artillery about 160–660 feet (50–200 m) behind the infantry, while the German artillery used indirect fire from concealed positions. With the guns so close to the infantry, the British had unintentionally increased the effectiveness of the German artillery-fire, because shells aimed at the British infantry could just as easily hit the British guns.

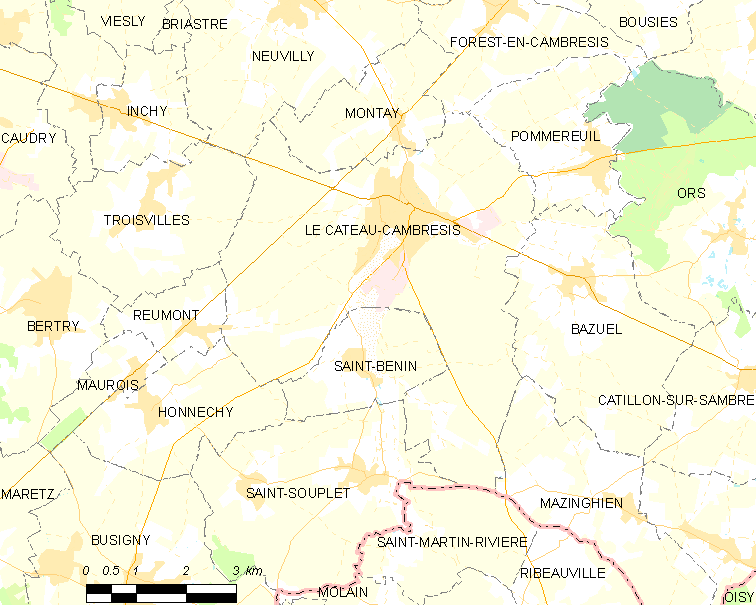
Modern map of the Le Cateau area (commune FR insee code 59136)

The British 5th Division was on the right flank, on the southern side of the Le Cateau–Cambrai road between Inchy and Le Cateau. The 3rd Division was in the centre, between Caudry and Inchy and the 4th Division was on the left flank, on the north bank of the Warnelle. The road was sunken in places, providing inadequate long-range firing positions and in many places the Germans could close up to the British positions unobserved. On the right flank, west of Le Cateau, the Germans marched along the road from the north to Le Cateau. The British were on a forward slope and suffered many casualties during the withdrawal.

At 03:30, Smith-Dorrien decided to "strike the enemy hard and after he had done so, continue the retreat" but the purpose of the operation was unclear to his subordinates. A "hold at all costs" mentality was evident in the 5th Division on the British right flank. The commander of the 2nd Battalion, King's Own Yorkshire Light Infantry, was given a written order that "There will now be NO retirement for the fighting troops; fill up your trenches, with water, food and ammunition as far as you can". The order was confirmed by a colonel from the II Corps staff. The delaying action never occurred because the order arrived at the front line at about the same time as the Germans, in some places later. Nor were the conditions of a doctrinal delay observed, such as refusing to let British units be pinned down. Smith-Dorrien did not choose positions with adequate fields-of-fire and with prepared and hidden routes of withdrawal.

Holding their ground despite many casualties, around noon, the British right and then the left flank began to collapse. The arrival of the Corps de cavalerie Sordet (French Cavalry Corps, General André Sordet) provided a shield for the British left flank and enabled the British to slip away, despite German attempts to infiltrate and outflank them. That night, the British and French withdrew to St Quentin.

== Aftermath ==
=== Analysis ===
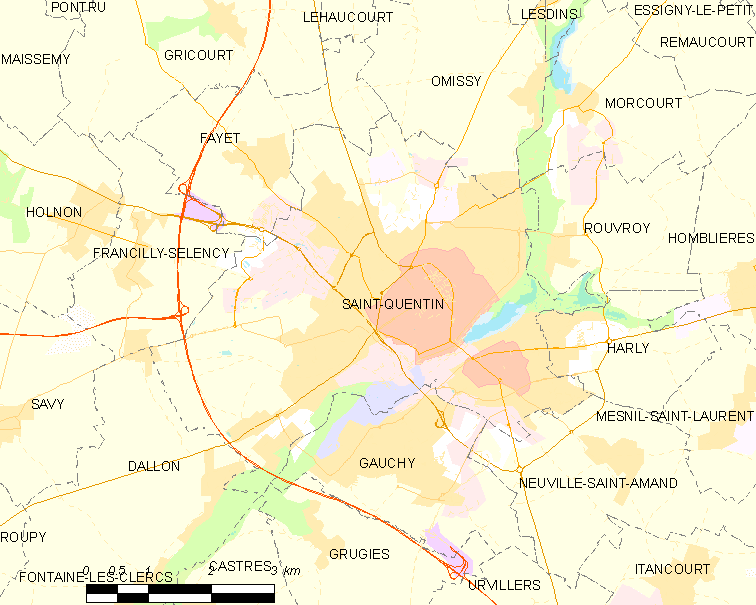
Modern map of the St Quentin area.

According to Der Weltkrieg, the German official history, Lieutenant-General Friedrich Sixt von Armin, the commander of IV Corps, issued an order at 11:15 that co-ordinated the encounter battle but there is no evidence of German command above the divisional level. About 75 per cent of the troops of IV Corps were in contact before they received the order and the rest never got to the battlefield. Sixt von Armin had no authority over II Cavalry Corps, which fought independently.

The Germans were pleased with their victory. The historian of Infantry Regiment 93 wrote

The battle of Beaumont-Inchy will always be one of the most glorious days in the history of the regiment, which demonstrated that in a frontal attack against an enemy that was heretofore considered unbeatable, the crack troops of the British Army, the 93rd was not merely their equal, it was superior." 75th Field Artillery Regiment said that the battle "strengthened the self-confidence of the German troops ... all the more so because the British army was made up almost exclusively of long-service active army troops, who were superbly trained and equipped.

— Historian, IR 93

German satisfaction in part arose from a mistaken belief that they had defeated the BEF, not II Corps and a cavalry brigade. It was this mistake which allowed II Corps to retire as German troops were given a night of rest instead of being sent to pursue the British forces. Although credited at the time by Field Marshal Sir John French for having saved the BEF, he later criticised Smith-Dorrien. In 2013, the historian, Spencer Jones, wrote that strategically, the stand of II Corps achieved Smith-Dorrien's aim of relieving pressure on the retreat. For the remainder of the campaign II Corps was not seriously troubled by the German pursuit. To that extent Jones concluded that the battle was 'a crucial, albeit bloody, victory for the BEF'.

=== Casualties ===
In 1926, James Edmonds, the British official historian, wrote that of the 40,000 British troops who fought at Le Cateau, 7,812 became casualties, 2,600 being taken prisoner. Thirty-eight guns were abandoned, most having their breech blocks removed and sights disabled by the gun crews. In 2008 Cave and Sheldon speculated that German casualties "are not likely to have been any more than 2,000". In 2011, Terry Zuber wrote that having suffered 7,000 casualties and with another 2,500–3,000 footsore and exhausted men having to be evacuated to Le Mans to recuperate, II Corps was not battle-worthy for at least two days. Zuber wrote that the Germans suffered 2,900 casualties. In 2008, Antony Bird wrote that the Commonwealth War Graves Commission counted 1,200 British troops killed and gave a total of 7,812 casualties.

=== Subsequent events ===
II Corps retreated on the morning of 27 August and in two days of marching, broke contact with the Germans. The Second Battle of Le Cateau took place in much the same area from 5 to 11 October 1918. The Entente captured the St. Quentin–Cambrai railway, 12,000 prisoners and 250 guns for 536 casualties.

== See also ==
- Retreat from Mons
- La Ferté-sous-Jouarre memorial
