= Thun-l'Évêque =

- Commune
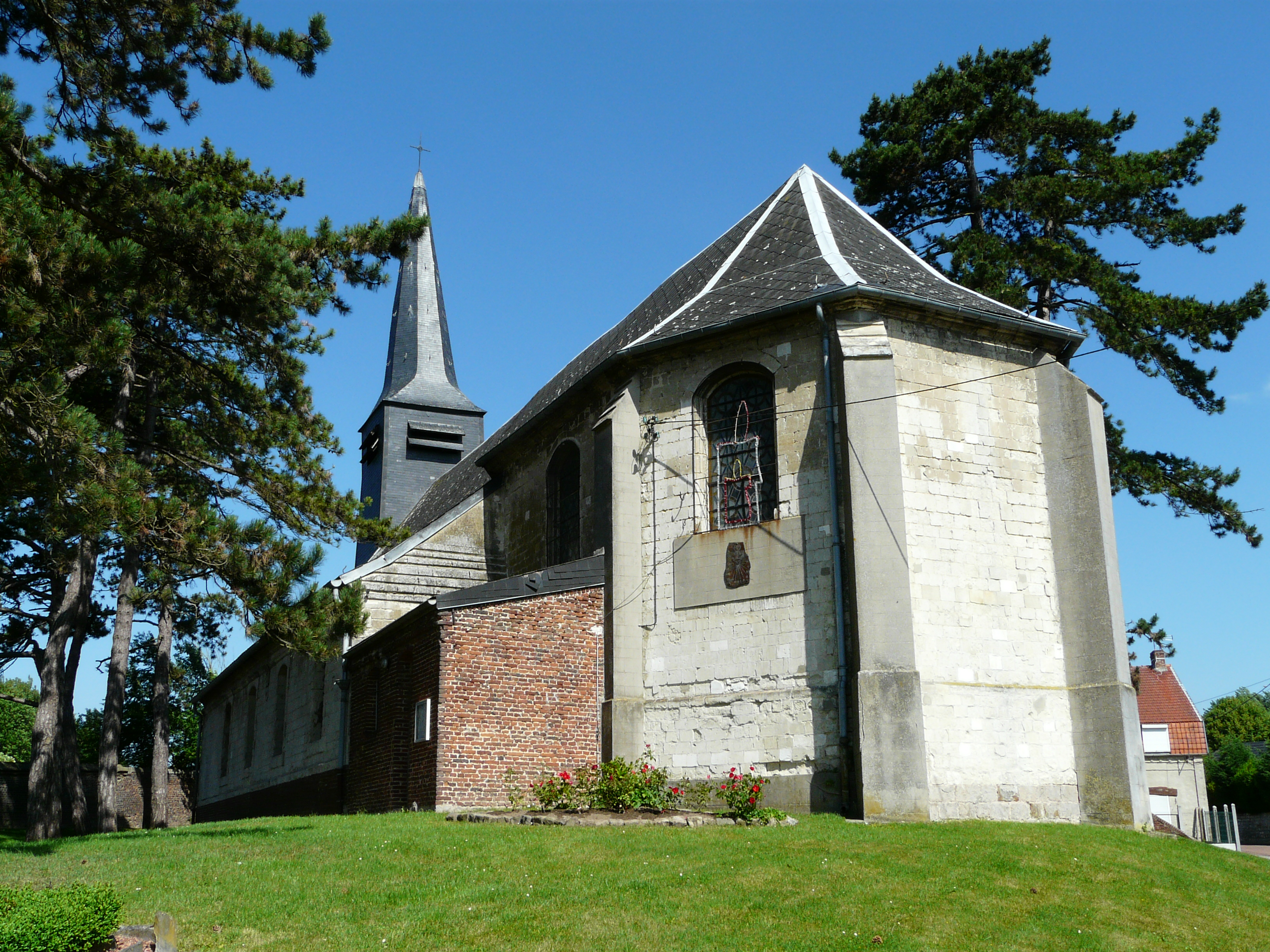
- The church in Thun-l'Évêque

- Coat of arms
- Location of Thun-l'Évêque
- Location within France Location within Hauts-de-France
- Coordinates: 50°13′38″N 3°17′20″E
- Country: France
- Region: Hauts-de-France
- Department: Nord
- Arrondissement: Cambrai
- Canton: Cambrai
- Intercommunality: CA Cambrai

Government
  - Mayor (2020–2026): Jacques Denoyelle
- Area^{1}: 5.69 km^{2} (2.20 sq mi)
- Elevation: 84 m (276 ft)
- Highest elevation: 76 m (249 ft)
- Lowest elevation: 36 m (118 ft)
- Population (2023): 788
  - Density: 138/km^{2} (359/sq mi)
- Time zone: UTC+01:00 (CET)
  - Summer (DST): UTC+02:00 (CEST)
- INSEE/Postal code: 59593 /59141
- ^{1} French Land Register data, which excludes lakes, ponds, glaciers > 1 km^{2} (0.386 sq mi or 247 acres) and river estuaries.

Thun-l'Évêque (French pronunciation: [tœ̃ levɛk]) is a commune in the Nord department in northern France.

== Heraldry ==
Arms of Thun-l'Évêque	The arms of Thun-l'Évêque are blazoned : Or, 3 lions azure, on a chief gules, a demi-'Notre-Dame-de-Grâce de carnation' issuant from the line of division, vested gules and azure and holding in her left arm the Baby Jesus. (Boursies, Cattenières, Carnières, Estrun, Maresches, Onnaing, Ors, Orsinval, Thun-l'Évêque and originally, Notre-Dame de Cambrai, use the same arms.)

== See also ==
- Communes of the Nord department
