= Boursies =

- Commune
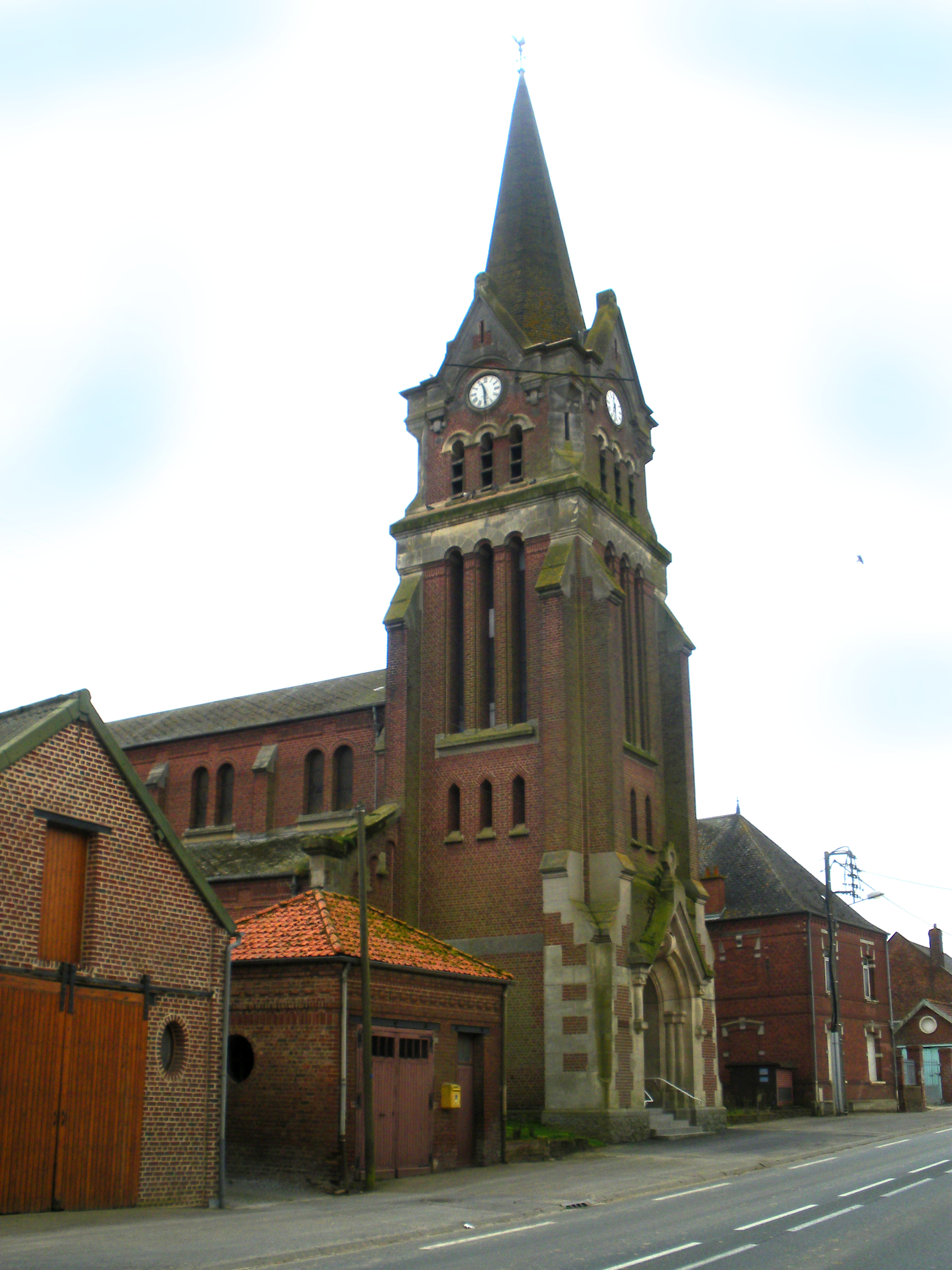
- The church in Boursies

- Coat of arms
- Location of Boursies
- Location within France Location within Hauts-de-France
- Coordinates: 50°08′27″N 3°02′02″E
- Country: France
- Region: Hauts-de-France
- Department: Nord
- Arrondissement: Cambrai
- Canton: Cambrai
- Intercommunality: CA Cambrai

Government
  - Mayor (2020–2026): Slimane Rahem
- Area^{1}: 7.62 km^{2} (2.94 sq mi)
- Elevation: 90 m (300 ft)
- Highest elevation: 103 m (338 ft)
- Lowest elevation: 64 m (210 ft)
- Population (2023): 360
  - Density: 47/km^{2} (120/sq mi)
- Time zone: UTC+01:00 (CET)
  - Summer (DST): UTC+02:00 (CEST)
- INSEE/Postal code: 59097 /59400
- ^{1} French Land Register data, which excludes lakes, ponds, glaciers > 1 km^{2} (0.386 sq mi or 247 acres) and river estuaries.

Boursies (French pronunciation: [buʁsi]) is a commune in the Nord department in northern France.

== Population ==
Historical population
Year	Pop.	±% p.a.
1968	318	—
1975	285	−1.55%
1982	239	−2.48%
1990	243	+0.21%
1999	285	+1.79%
2007	304	+0.81%
2012	347	+2.68%
2017	394	+2.57%
2023	360	−1.49%
Source: INSEE

== Heraldry ==
Arms of Boursies	The arms of Boursies are blazoned : Or, 3 lions azure, on a chief gules, a demi-'Notre-Dame-de-Grâce de carnation' issuant from the line of division, vested gules and azure and holding in her left arm the Baby Jesus. (Boursies, Cattenières, Carnières, Estrun, Maresches, Onnaing, Ors, Orsinval, Thun-l'Évêque and originally, Notre-Dame de Cambrai, use the same arms.)

== See also ==
- Communes of the Nord department
