= Estrun =

- Commune
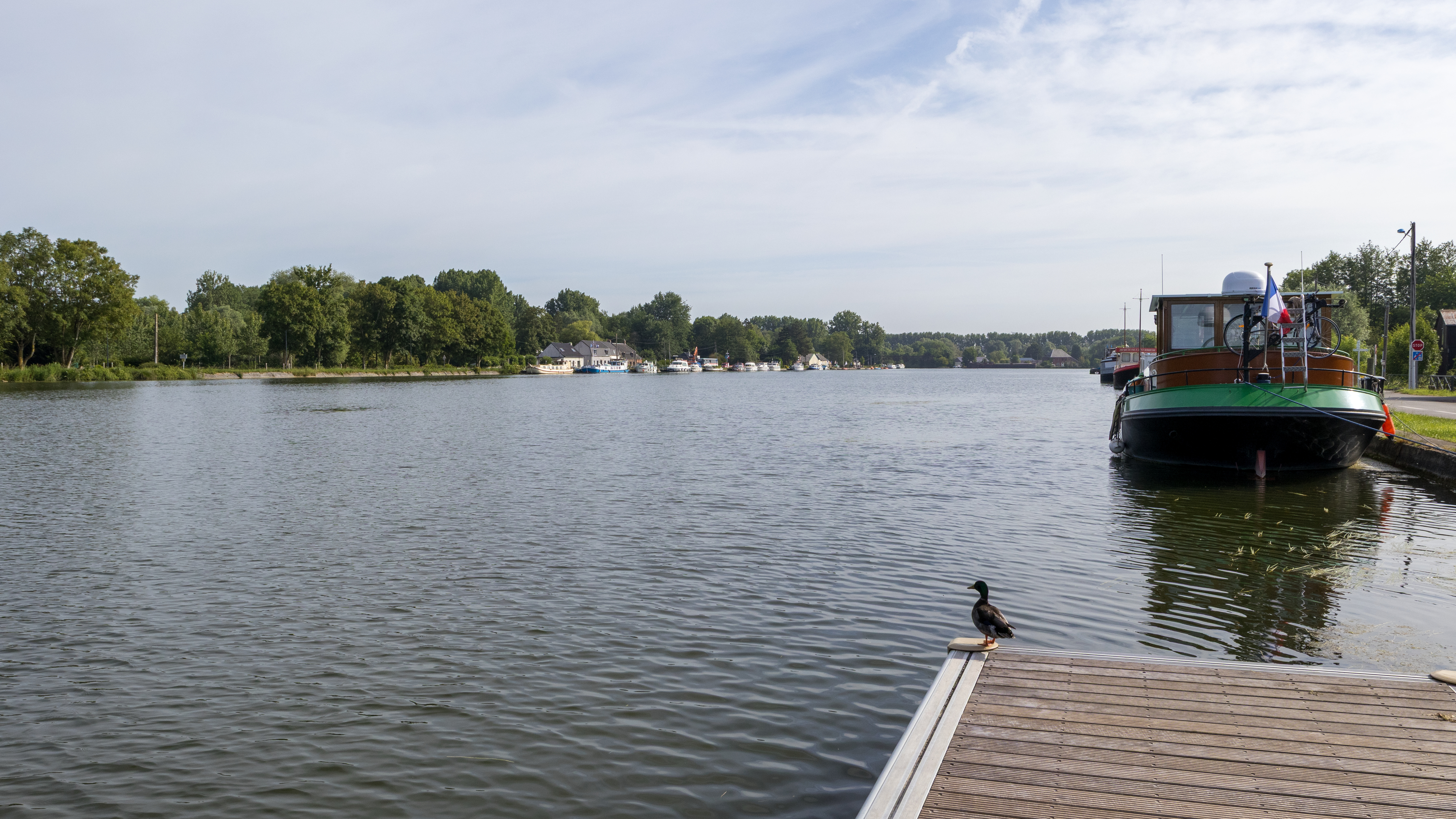
- The canal basin in Estrun

- Coat of arms
- Location of Estrun
- Location within France Location within Hauts-de-France
- Coordinates: 50°14′55″N 3°17′42″E
- Country: France
- Region: Hauts-de-France
- Department: Nord
- Arrondissement: Cambrai
- Canton: Cambrai
- Intercommunality: CA Cambrai

Government
  - Mayor (2020–2026): Jean-Luc Fasciaux
- Area^{1}: 2.82 km^{2} (1.09 sq mi)
- Elevation: 52 m (171 ft)
- Highest elevation: 72 m (236 ft)
- Lowest elevation: 34 m (112 ft)
- Population (2023): 725
  - Density: 257/km^{2} (666/sq mi)
- Time zone: UTC+01:00 (CET)
  - Summer (DST): UTC+02:00 (CEST)
- INSEE/Postal code: 59219 /59295
- ^{1} French Land Register data, which excludes lakes, ponds, glaciers > 1 km^{2} (0.386 sq mi or 247 acres) and river estuaries.

Estrun (French pronunciation: [etʁœ̃], before 1994: Étrun) is a commune in the Nord department in northern France.

== Heraldry ==
Arms of Estrun	The arms of Estrun are blazoned : Or, 3 lions azure, on a chief gules, a demi-'Notre-Dame-de-Grâce de carnation' issuant from the line of division, vested gules and azure and holding in her left arm the Baby Jesus. (Boursies, Cattenières, Carnières, Estrun, Maresches, Onnaing, Ors, Orsinval, Thun-l'Évêque and originally, Notre-Dame de Cambrai, use the same arms.)

== See also ==
- Communes of the Nord department
