= Maresches =

- Commune
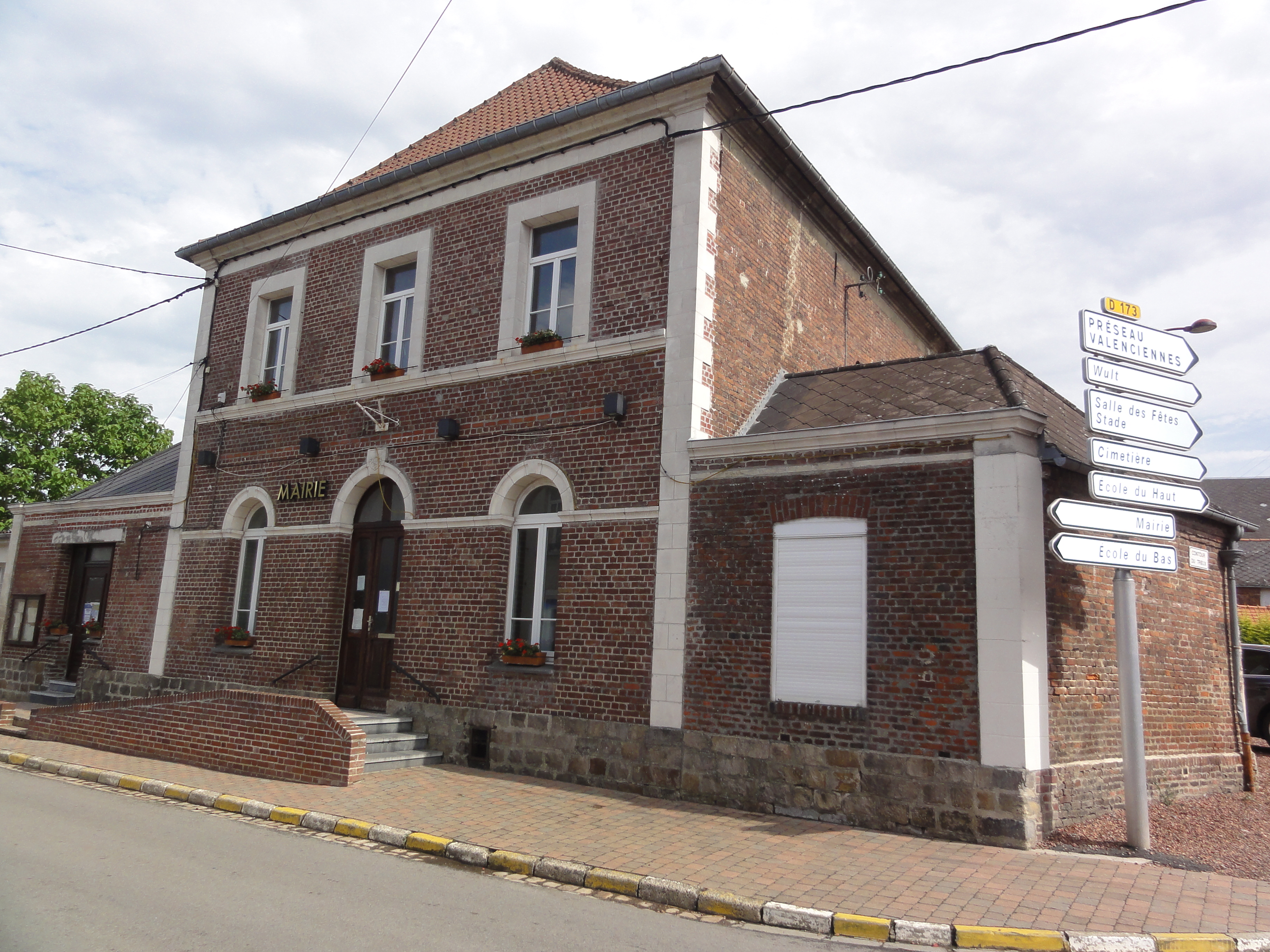
- The town hall in Maresches

- Coat of arms
- Location of Maresches
- Location within France Location within Hauts-de-France
- Coordinates: 50°17′36″N 3°34′32″E
- Country: France
- Region: Hauts-de-France
- Department: Nord
- Arrondissement: Avesnes-sur-Helpe
- Canton: Avesnes-sur-Helpe
- Intercommunality: CC Pays de Mormal

Government
  - Mayor (2020–2026): Jean-Noël Brichant
- Area^{1}: 4.78 km^{2} (1.85 sq mi)
- Elevation: 100 m (330 ft)
- Highest elevation: 106 m (348 ft)
- Lowest elevation: 49 m (161 ft)
- Population (2023): 808
  - Density: 169/km^{2} (438/sq mi)
- Time zone: UTC+01:00 (CET)
  - Summer (DST): UTC+02:00 (CEST)
- INSEE/Postal code: 59381 /59990
- ^{1} French Land Register data, which excludes lakes, ponds, glaciers > 1 km^{2} (0.386 sq mi or 247 acres) and river estuaries.

Maresches (French pronunciation: [maʁɛʃ]) is a commune in the Nord department in northern France.

== History ==
During World War I the Germans occupied Maresches. Private A S Bullock, in a posthumously published memoir, recalls going over the top to drive them back, describing 'the tremendous artillery bombardment'. He recalls, 'The noise was terrific and the only thing that could be heard above the shells, which were bursting everywhere, was the crackling of the Vickers machine guns.' Bullock notes that this was the fourth time he went over the top. He remembers, perhaps significantly, 'I had the Lewis gun, and the team stayed with me'. He records struggling to carry the 40 lb gun over a barbed wire entanglement at night during a poison gas attack, and having to remove his gas mask to avoid getting left behind. He also reports an incident of bravery and ferocity by one Corporal Wilcox who later received the Victoria Cross.

== Heraldry ==
Arms of Maresches	The arms of Maresches are blazoned : Or, 3 lions azure, on a chief gules, a demi-'Notre-Dame-de-Grâce de carnation' issuant from the line of division, vested gules and azure and holding in her left arm the Baby Jesus. (Boursies, Cattenières, Carnières, Estrun, Maresches, Onnaing, Ors, Orsinval, Thun-l'Évêque and originally, Notre-Dame de Cambrai, use the same arms.)

== See also ==
- Communes of the Nord department
