= Ors =

- Commune
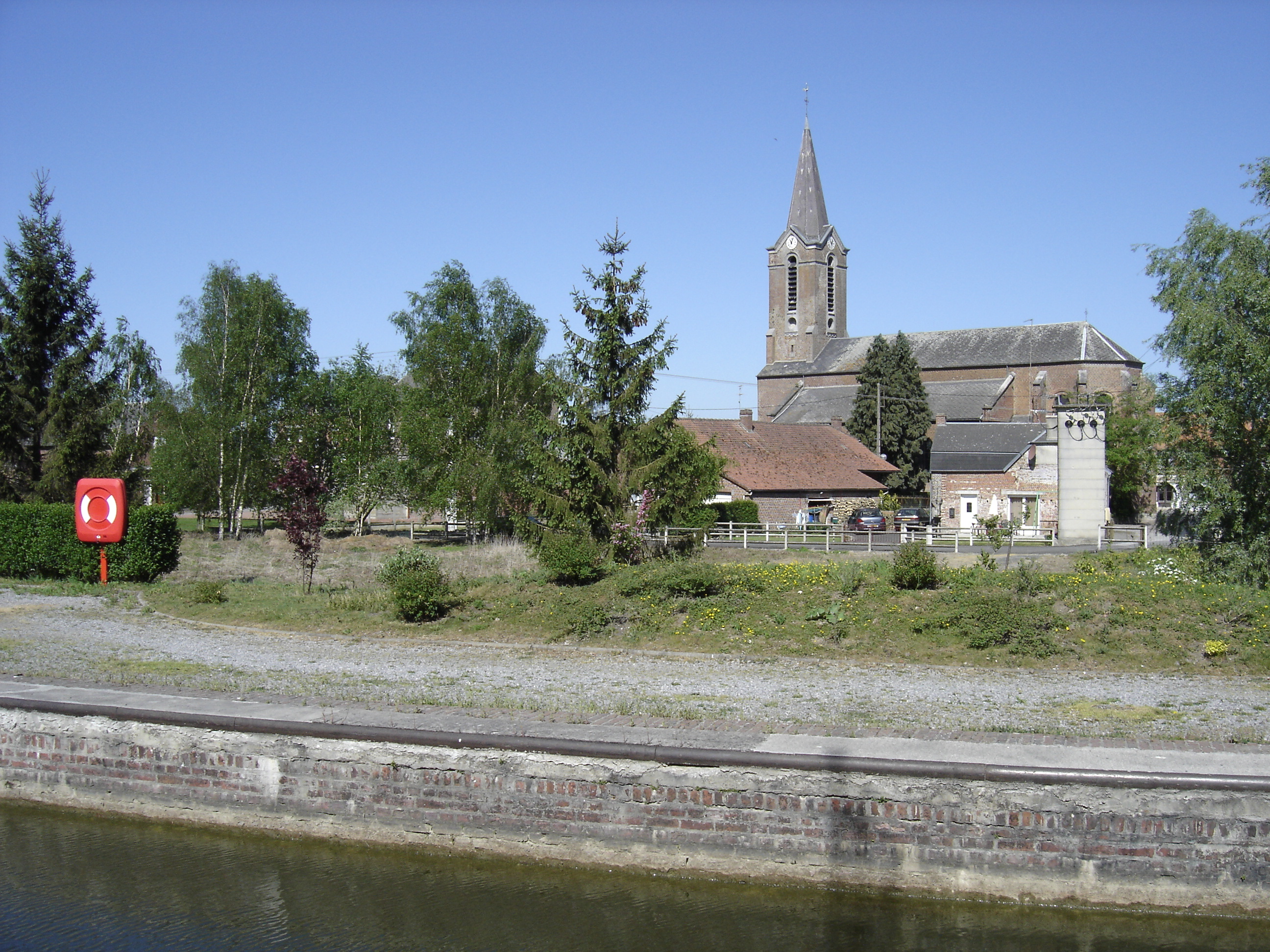
- Center of the village, canal, and church

- Coat of arms
- Location of Ors
- Location within France Location within Hauts-de-France
- Coordinates: 50°06′01″N 3°38′05″E
- Country: France
- Region: Hauts-de-France
- Department: Nord
- Arrondissement: Cambrai
- Canton: Le Cateau-Cambrésis
- Intercommunality: CA Caudrésis–Catésis

Government
  - Mayor (2020–2026): Jacky Duminy
- Area^{1}: 17.76 km^{2} (6.86 sq mi)
- Elevation: 159 m (522 ft)
- Highest elevation: 167 m (548 ft)
- Lowest elevation: 133 m (436 ft)
- Population (2023): 644
  - Density: 36.3/km^{2} (93.9/sq mi)
- Time zone: UTC+01:00 (CET)
  - Summer (DST): UTC+02:00 (CEST)
- INSEE/Postal code: 59450 /59360
- ^{1} French Land Register data, which excludes lakes, ponds, glaciers > 1 km^{2} (0.386 sq mi or 247 acres) and river estuaries.

Ors (French pronunciation: [ɔʁ(s)]) is a commune in the Nord department in northern France.

It is located on the Sambre–Oise Canal, in a small wood called Bois l'Évêque.

== History ==
The commune was an area of intense fighting in November 1918 for control of the canal. Second Lieutenant Wilfred Owen was killed in action there, a week before the Armistice, and is buried at the Communal Cemetery beside many of his men. The village's new (2014) primary school is named for Owen.

Ors is famous for its yearly water jousting competition on the canal every August 15.

=== Heraldry ===
| Arms of Ors | The arms of Ors are blazoned : Or, 3 lions azure, on a chief gules, a demi-'Notre-Dame-de-Grâce de carnation' issuant from the line of division, vested gules and azure and holding in her left arm the Baby Jesus. (Boursies, Cattenières, Carnières, Estrun, Maresches, Onnaing, Ors, Orsinval, Thun-l'Évêque and originally, Notre-Dame de Cambrai, use the same arms.) |

== Monuments ==
The church, Église de l'Assomption, was built from 1851 to 1872.

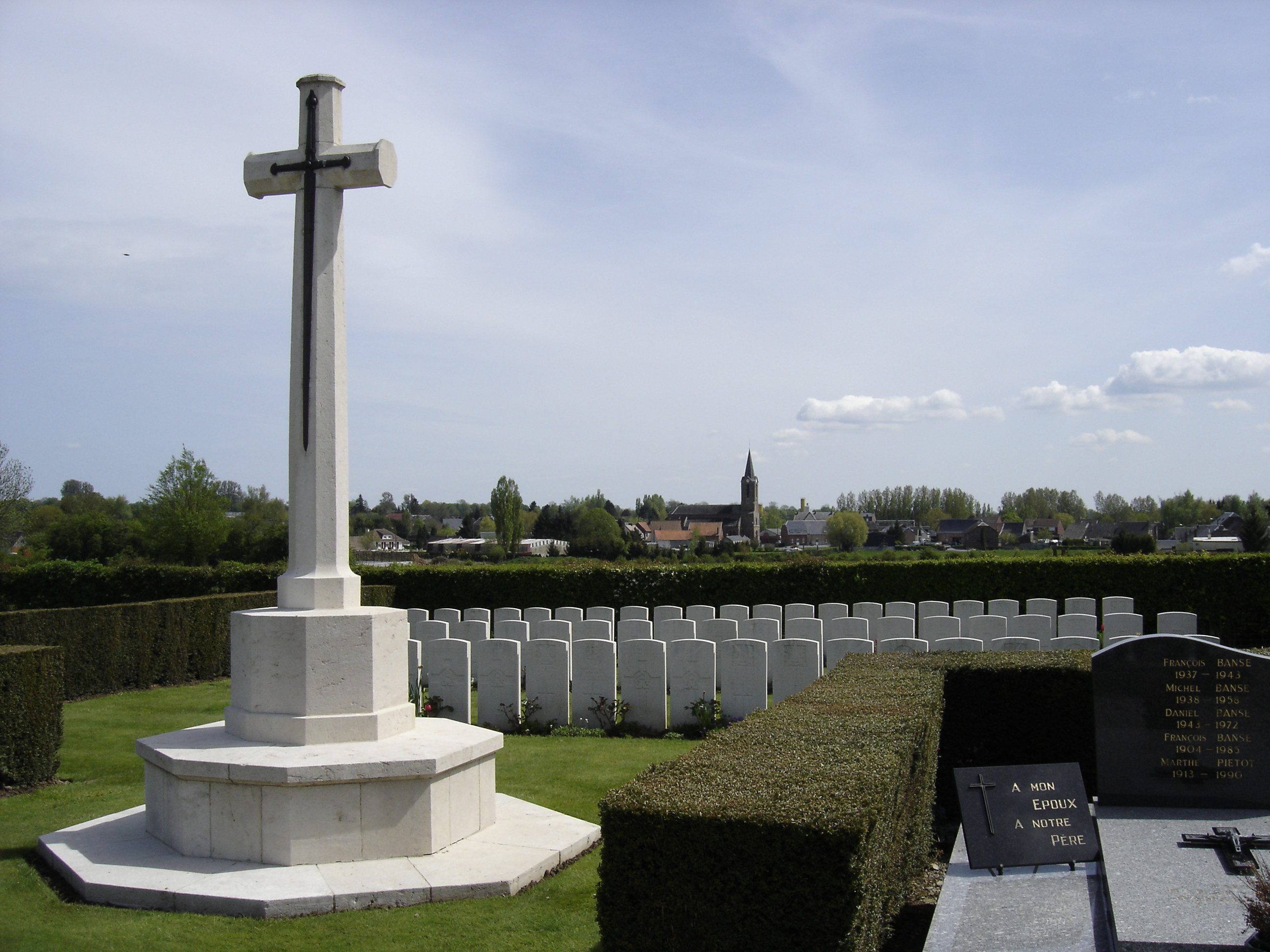
Ors Communal Cemetery

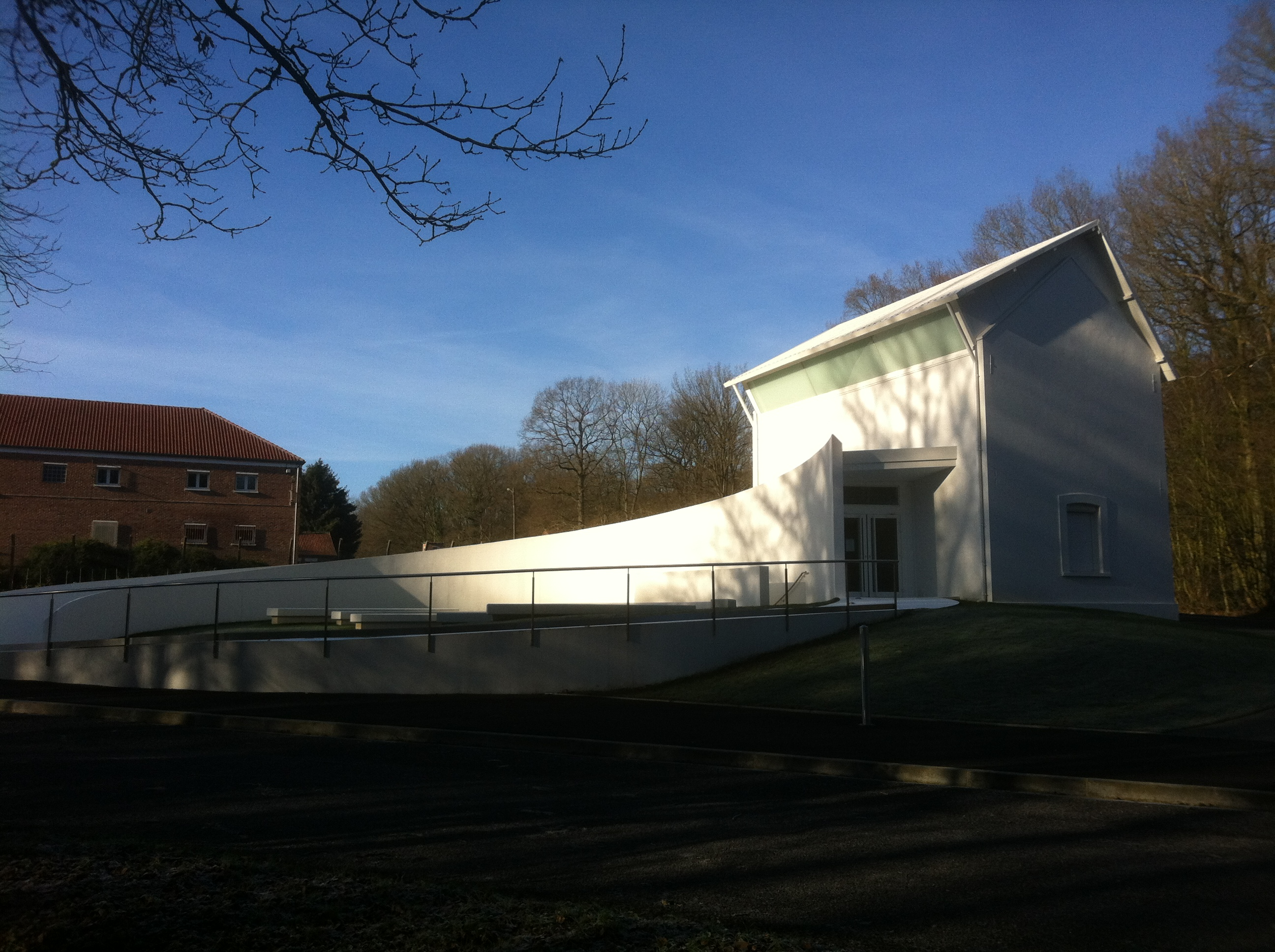
The Wilfred Owen Memorial in Ors

== See also ==
- Communes of the Nord department
