= Onnaing =

- Commune
- Coat of arms
- Location of Onnaing
- Location within France Location within Hauts-de-France
- Coordinates: 50°23′18″N 3°35′56″E
- Country: France
- Region: Hauts-de-France
- Department: Nord
- Arrondissement: Valenciennes
- Canton: Anzin
- Intercommunality: CA Valenciennes Métropole

Government
  - Mayor (2020–2026): Xavier Jouanin
- Area^{1}: 12.97 km^{2} (5.01 sq mi)
- Elevation: 27 m (89 ft)
- Highest elevation: 68 m (223 ft)
- Lowest elevation: 16 m (52 ft)
- Population (2023): 8,479
  - Density: 653.7/km^{2} (1,693/sq mi)
- Time zone: UTC+01:00 (CET)
  - Summer (DST): UTC+02:00 (CEST)
- INSEE/Postal code: 59447 /59264
- ^{1} French Land Register data, which excludes lakes, ponds, glaciers > 1 km^{2} (0.386 sq mi or 247 acres) and river estuaries.

Onnaing (French pronunciation: [ɔnɛ̃]) is a commune in the Nord department in northern France. Onnaing is home to Toyota Motor Manufacturing France, where the Toyota Yaris and Yaris Cross are assembled.

== Population ==
Historical population
Year	Pop.	±% p.a.
1968	9,673	—
1975	9,715	+0.06%
1982	9,157	−0.84%
1990	9,173	+0.02%
1999	8,779	−0.49%
2007	8,682	−0.14%
2012	8,715	+0.08%
2017	8,797	+0.19%
2023	8,479	−0.61%
Source: INSEE

== Heraldry ==
Arms of Onnaing	The arms of Onnaing are blazoned : Or, 3 lions azure, on a chief gules, a demi-'Notre-Dame-de-Grâce de carnation' issuant from the line of division, vested gules and azure and holding in her left arm the Baby Jesus. (Boursies, Cattenières, Carnières, Estrun, Maresches, Onnaing, Ors, Orsinval, Thun-l'Évêque and originally, Notre-Dame de Cambrai, use the same arms.)

== See also ==
- Communes of the Nord department
