= Orsinval =

- Commune
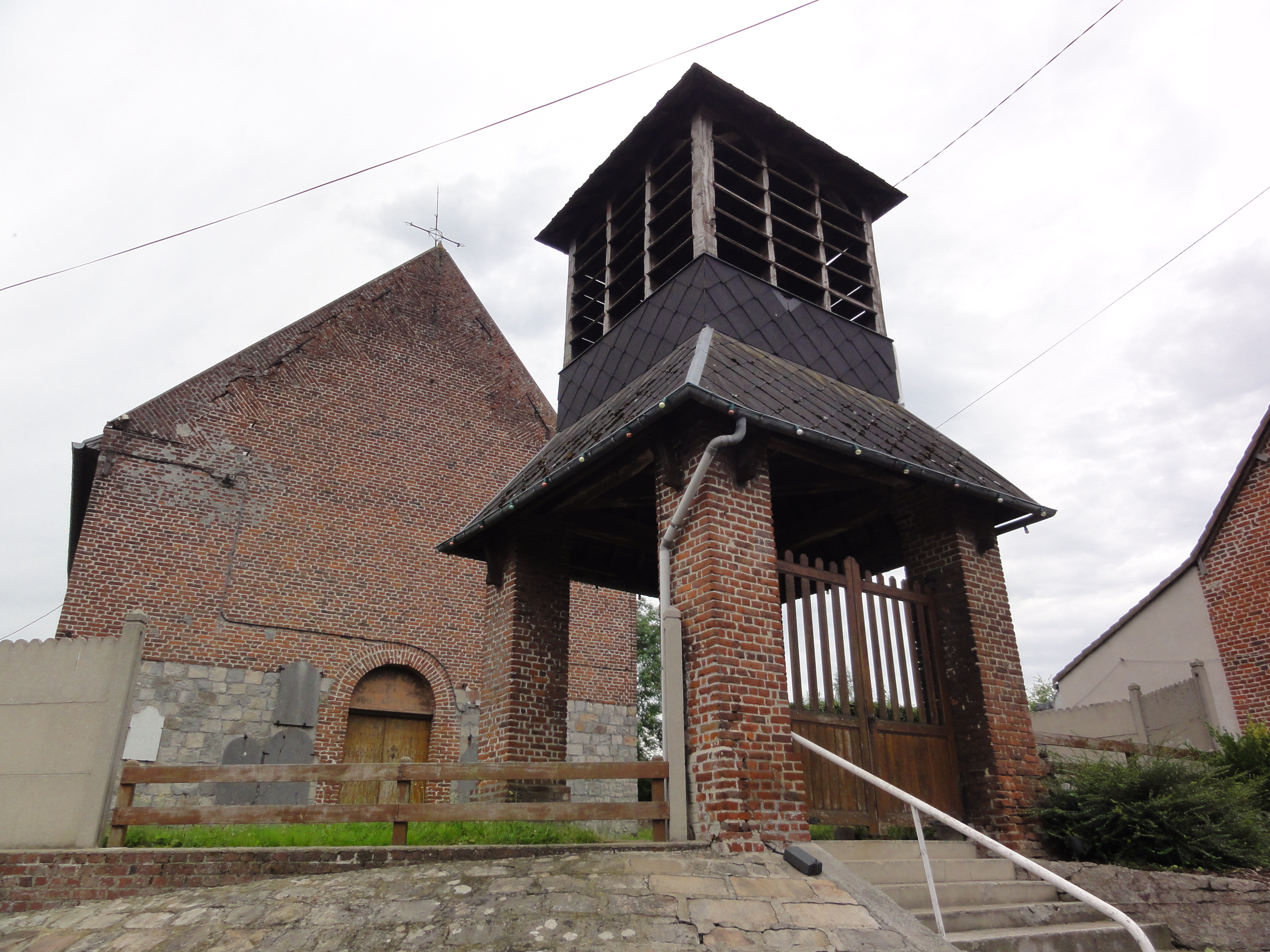
- The church bell tower in Orsinval

- Coat of arms
- Location of Orsinval
- Location within France Location within Hauts-de-France
- Coordinates: 50°16′28″N 3°37′53″E
- Country: France
- Region: Hauts-de-France
- Department: Nord
- Arrondissement: Avesnes-sur-Helpe
- Canton: Avesnes-sur-Helpe
- Intercommunality: CC du pays de Mormal

Government
  - Mayor (2020–2026): Valérie Cochez
- Area^{1}: 3.34 km^{2} (1.29 sq mi)
- Elevation: 98 m (322 ft)
- Highest elevation: 123 m (404 ft)
- Lowest elevation: 74 m (243 ft)
- Population (2023): 564
  - Density: 169/km^{2} (437/sq mi)
- Time zone: UTC+01:00 (CET)
  - Summer (DST): UTC+02:00 (CEST)
- INSEE/Postal code: 59451 /59530
- ^{1} French Land Register data, which excludes lakes, ponds, glaciers > 1 km^{2} (0.386 sq mi or 247 acres) and river estuaries.

Orsinval (French pronunciation: [ɔʁsɛ̃val]) is a commune in the Nord department in northern France.

== Heraldry ==
Arms of Orsinval	The arms of Orsinval are blazoned : Or, 3 lions azure, on a chief gules, a demi-'Notre-Dame-de-Grâce de carnation' issuant from the line of division, vested gules and azure and holding in her left arm the Baby Jesus. (Boursies, Cattenières, Carnières, Estrun, Maresches, Onnaing, Ors, Orsinval, Thun-l'Évêque and originally, Notre-Dame de Cambrai, use the same arms.)

== See also ==
- Communes of the Nord department
