= Maurois station =

Railway station in France

Maurois
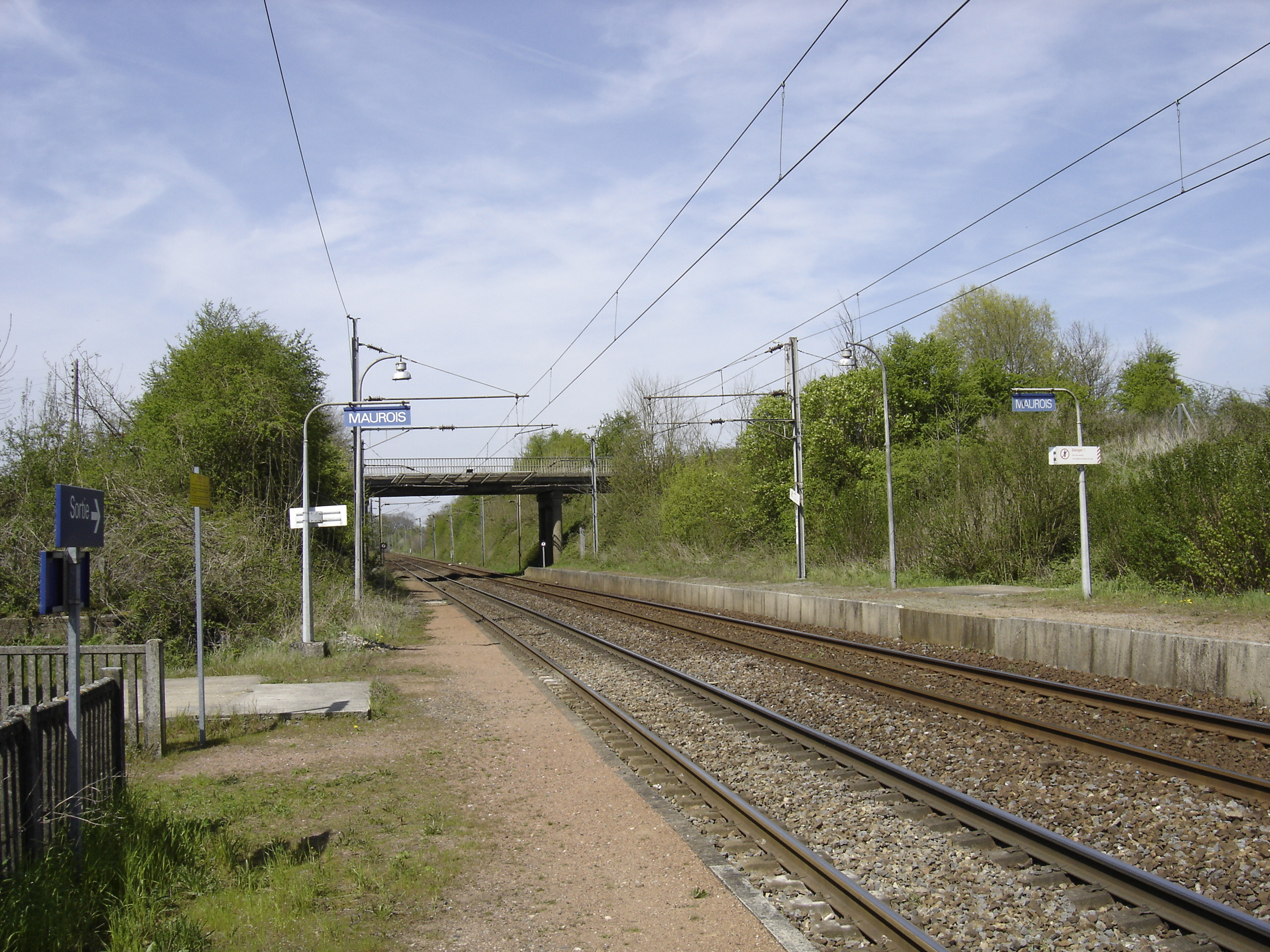

General information
- Location: Maurois
- Coordinates: 50°4′3″N 3°27′22″E
- Owner: RFF/SNCF
- Line: Busigny–Somain railway
- Platforms: 2
- Tracks: 2

Other information
- Station code: 87345546

Services
Preceding station	TER Hauts-de-France	Following station
Bertry towards Douai	Proxi P40	Busigny towards Saint-Quentin
Location

Maurois is a railway station located in the commune of Maurois in the Nord department, France. It is located near the D932 highway. The station is served by TER Hauts-de-France trains (Douai - Saint-Quentin line). There is no passenger building.

== See also ==
- List of SNCF stations in Hauts-de-France
