= Wambaix station =

Railway station in Wambaix, France

Wambaix
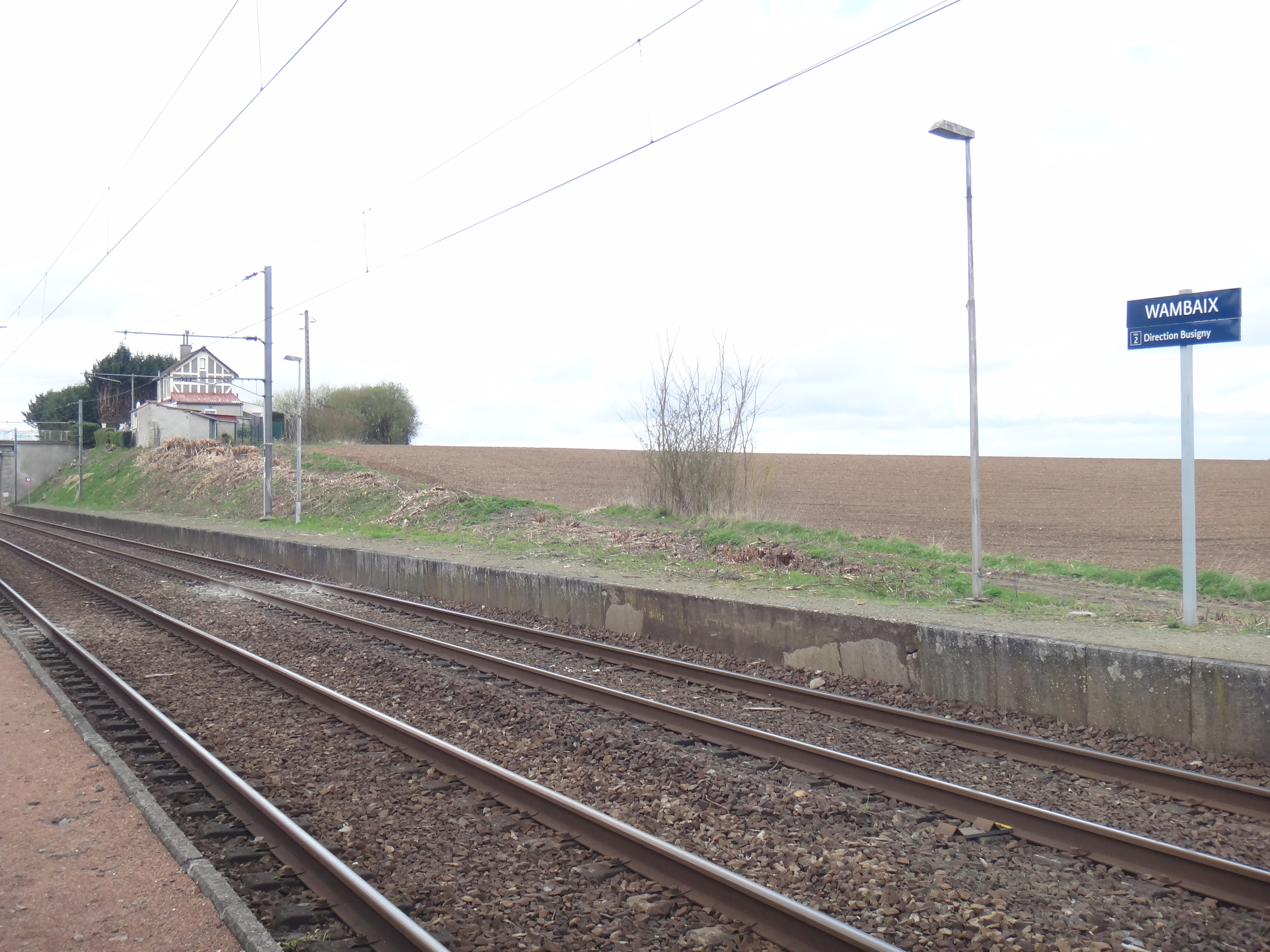

General information
- Location: Wambaix
- Coordinates: 50°8′2″N 3°18′41″E
- Owner: RFF/SNCF
- Line: Busigny–Somain railway

Other information
- Station code: 87345595

Services
Preceding station	TER Hauts-de-France	Following station
Cambrai towards Douai	Proxi P40	Cattenières towards Saint-Quentin
Location

Wambaix is a railway station located in the commune of Wambaix in the Nord department, France. The station is served by TER Hauts-de-France trains (Douai - Saint-Quentin).

== See also ==
- List of SNCF stations in Hauts-de-France
