= Cattenières station =

Railway station in France

Cattenières
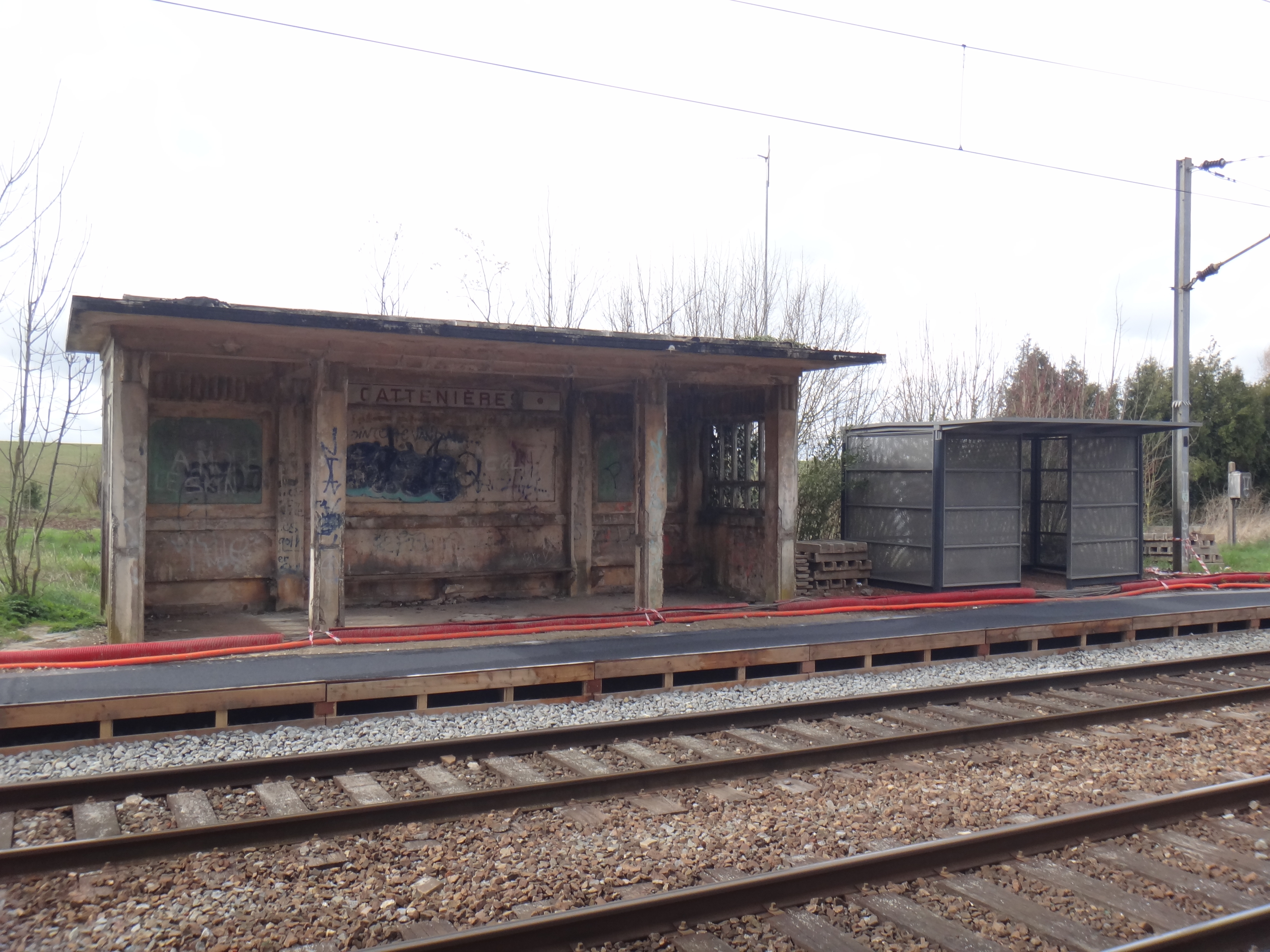

General information
- Location: Cattenières
- Coordinates: 50°7′42″N 3°20′1″E
- Owner: RFF/SNCF
- Line: Busigny–Somain railway

Other information
- Station code: 87345587

History
- Opened: 1858

Services
| Preceding station | TER Hauts-de-France | Following station |
|---|---|---|
| Wambaix towards Douai | Proxi P40 | Caudry towards Saint-Quentin |
Location

Cattenières is a railway station located in the commune of Cattenières in the Nord department, France. The station is served by TER Hauts-de-France trains (Douai - Saint-Quentin). Its elevation is 103 m.

== See also ==
- List of SNCF stations in Hauts-de-France
