= Busigny station =

Railway station in Busigny, France

Coordinates: 50°2′23″N 3°26′46″E

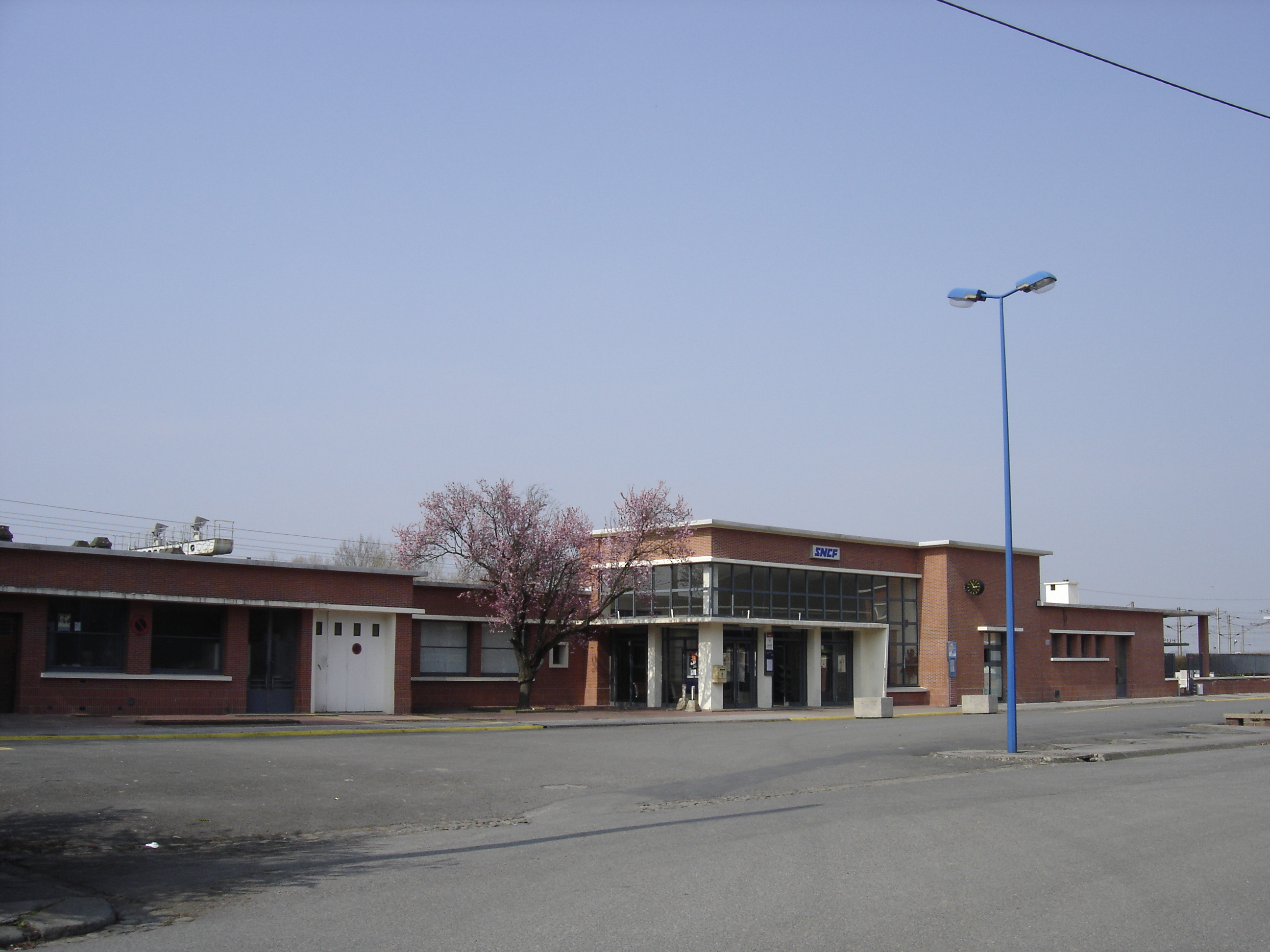
Busigny station

Busigny is a railway station serving the town Busigny, Nord department, northern France. It is situated on the Creil–Jeumont railway.

The station is served by regional trains to Cambrai, Amiens, Saint-Quentin and Maubeuge.

Preceding station	TER Hauts-de-France	Following station
Caudry towards Cambrai	Krono K13	Saint-Quentin towards Paris-Nord
Le Cateau towards Maubeuge	Krono K13	Saint-Quentin towards Paris-Nord
Caudry towards Lille-Flandres	Krono K40	Saint-Quentin Terminus
Maurois towards Douai	Proxi P40	Bohain towards Saint-Quentin
Bohain towards Saint-Quentin	Proxi P62	Le Cateau towards Aulnoye-Aymeries
