= Caudry station =

French railway station

Caudry
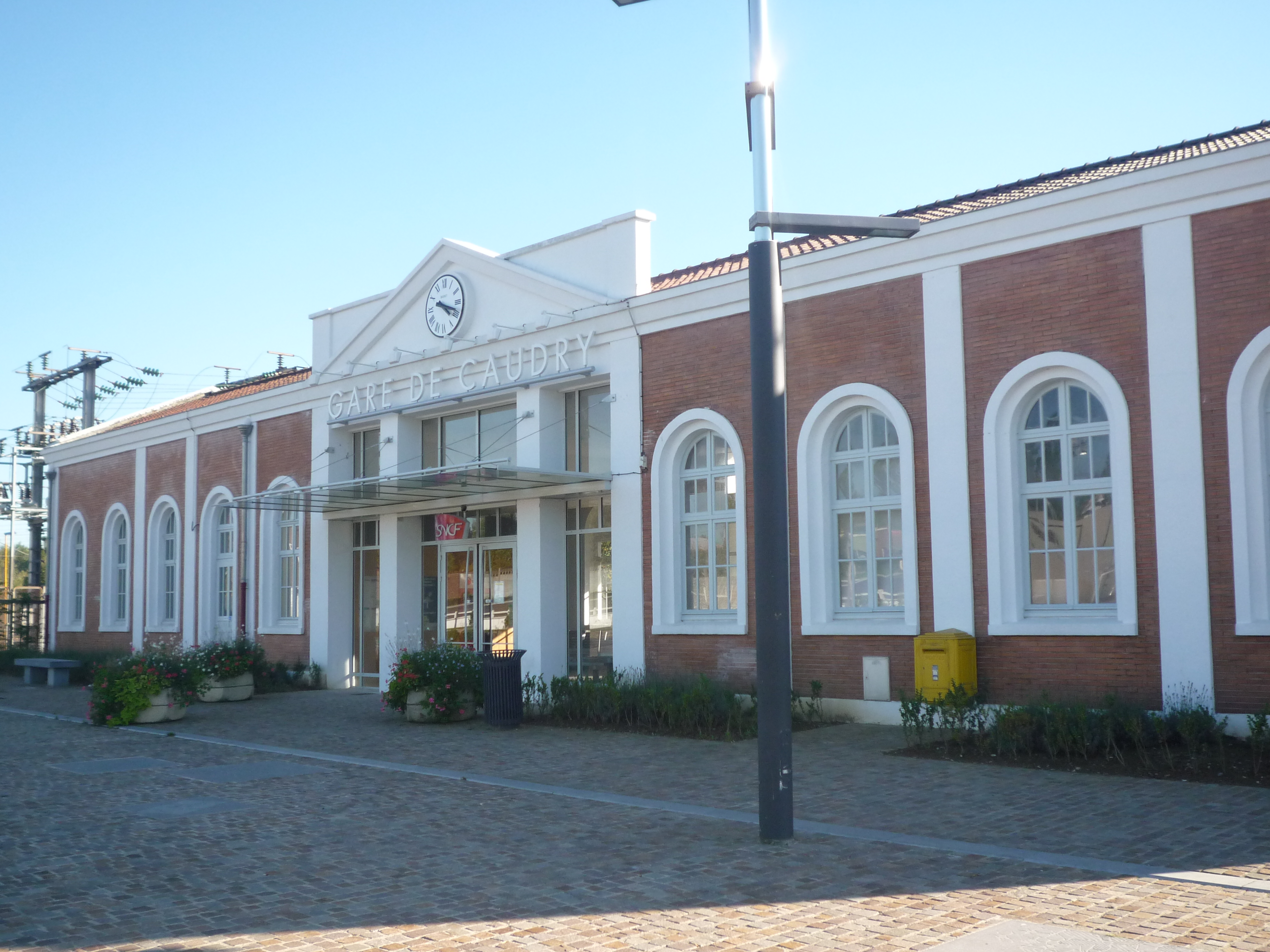
- Station entrance

General information
- Location: Rue de la Gare; 59540 Caudry
- Coordinates: 50°6′41″N 3°24′35″E
- Owner: RFF/SNCF
- Line: Lille Flandres-Chauny line

Other information
- Station code: 87345561

History
- Opened: 1858

Services
Preceding station	TER Hauts-de-France	Following station
Cambrai Terminus	Krono K13	Busigny towards Paris-Nord
Cambrai towards Lille-Flandres	Krono K40	Busigny towards Saint-Quentin
Cattenières towards Douai	Proxi P40	Bertry towards Saint-Quentin
Location

Caudry is a railway station located in the commune of Caudry in the Nord department, France. The station is served by TER Hauts-de-France trains (Lille-Flandres - Saint-Quentin line).

Caudry was formerly connected by secondary lines with Saint-Quentin via Le Catelet, Cambrai, Denain via Quiévy and Saint-Aubert and Catillon via Le Quesnoy. It was part of the metre gauge system of the Chemin de fer du Cambrésis.

== See also ==
- List of SNCF stations in Hauts-de-France
