= Bertry station =

French railway station

Bertry
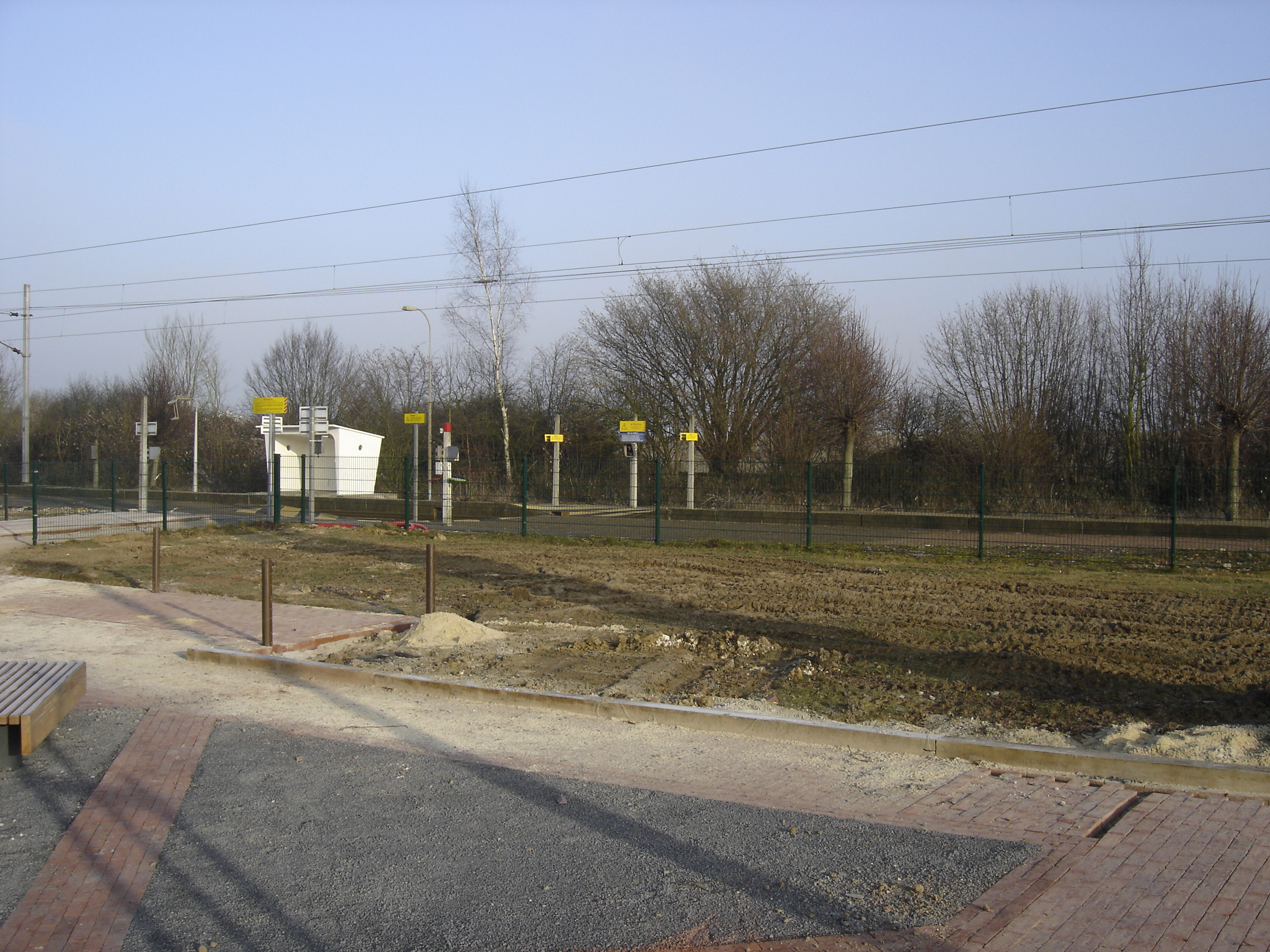

General information
- Location: Bertry
- Coordinates: 50°5′28″N 3°26′55″E
- Owner: SNCF
- Operator: SNCF
- Line: Busigny–Somain railway

Other information
- Station code: 87345553

History
- Opened: 1858

Services
Preceding station	TER Hauts-de-France	Following station
Caudry towards Douai	Proxi P40	Maurois towards Saint-Quentin
Location

Bertry station (French: Gare de Bertry) is a railway station located in the commune of Bertry in the Nord department, France. The station is served by TER Hauts-de-France trains (Douai–Saint-Quentin line).

The old station building was demolished in 2006 during a major redevelopment of the site and replaced by a car park for the station.

== See also ==
- List of SNCF stations in Hauts-de-France
