= Le Cateau station =

Railway station in France

Le Cateau
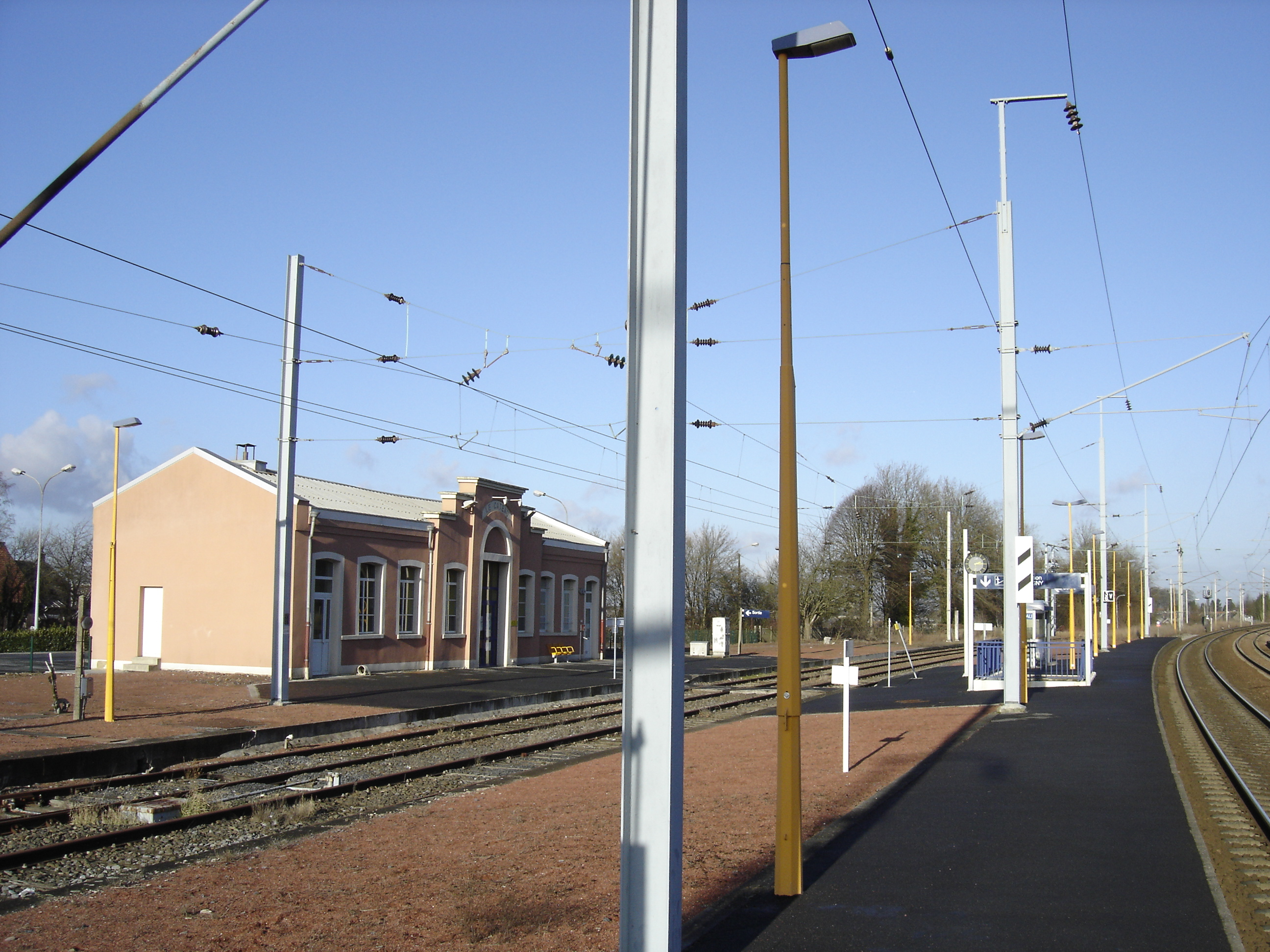

General information
- Location: Le Cateau-Cambrésis
- Coordinates: 50°5′29″N 3°32′24″E
- Owner: RFF/SNCF
- Line: Creil–Jeumont railway
- Platforms: 2
- Tracks: 2

Other information
- Station code: 87295220

Services
Preceding station	TER Hauts-de-France	Following station
Aulnoye-Aymeries towards Maubeuge	Krono K13	Busigny towards Paris-Nord
Busigny towards Saint-Quentin	Proxi P62	Ors towards Aulnoye-Aymeries
Location

Le Cateau is a railway station serving the town Le Cateau-Cambrésis, Nord department, northern France. It is situated on the Creil–Jeumont railway. It was used as a de-training point during the First World War.

The station is served by regional trains to Paris, Saint-Quentin and Maubeuge.
