= Bévillers =

- Commune
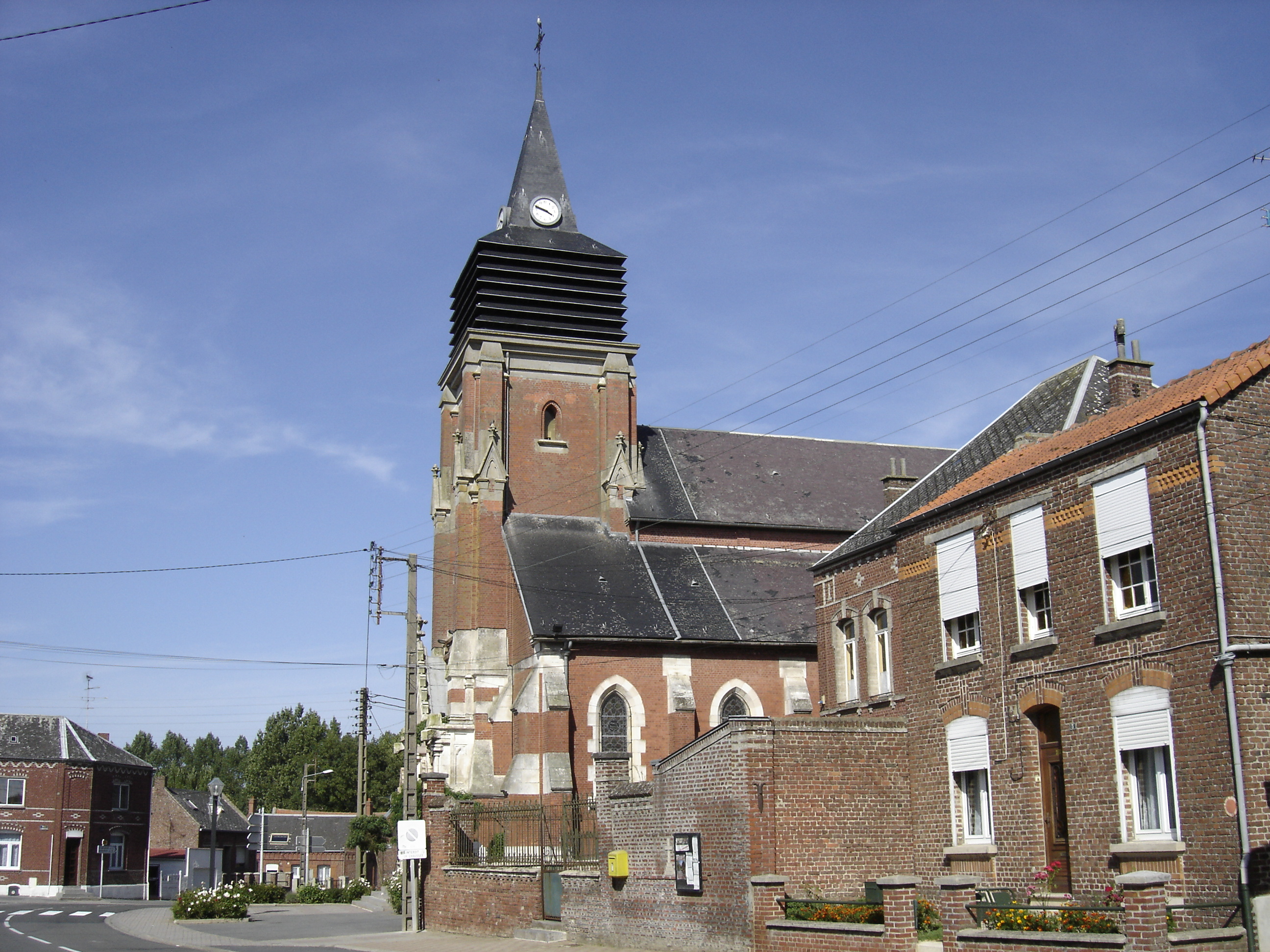
- The church in Bévillers

- Coat of arms
- Location of Bévillers
- Location within France Location within Hauts-de-France
- Coordinates: 50°09′30″N 3°23′25″E
- Country: France
- Region: Hauts-de-France
- Department: Nord
- Arrondissement: Cambrai
- Canton: Caudry
- Intercommunality: CA Caudrésis–Catésis

Government
  - Mayor (2020–2026): Pierre-Henri Dudant
- Area^{1}: 4.79 km^{2} (1.85 sq mi)
- Elevation: 116 m (381 ft)
- Highest elevation: 121 m (397 ft)
- Lowest elevation: 83 m (272 ft)
- Population (2023): 529
  - Density: 110/km^{2} (286/sq mi)
- Time zone: UTC+01:00 (CET)
  - Summer (DST): UTC+02:00 (CEST)
- INSEE/Postal code: 59081 /59217
- ^{1} French Land Register data, which excludes lakes, ponds, glaciers > 1 km^{2} (0.386 sq mi or 247 acres) and river estuaries.

Bévillers is a commune in the Nord department in northern France.

== Population ==
Historical population
Year	Pop.	±% p.a.
1968	586	—
1975	534	−1.32%
1982	525	−0.24%
1990	584	+1.34%
1999	565	−0.37%
2007	575	+0.22%
2012	543	−1.14%
2017	562	+0.69%
2023	529	−1.00%
Source: INSEE

== Heraldry ==
Arms of Bévillers	The arms of Bévillers are blazoned : Azure, a wyvern Or, langued gules. (Bévillers, Honnechy, Ramillies and Wambaix use the same arms.)

== See also ==
- Communes of the Nord department
