= Ramillies, Nord =

Ramillies
- Commune
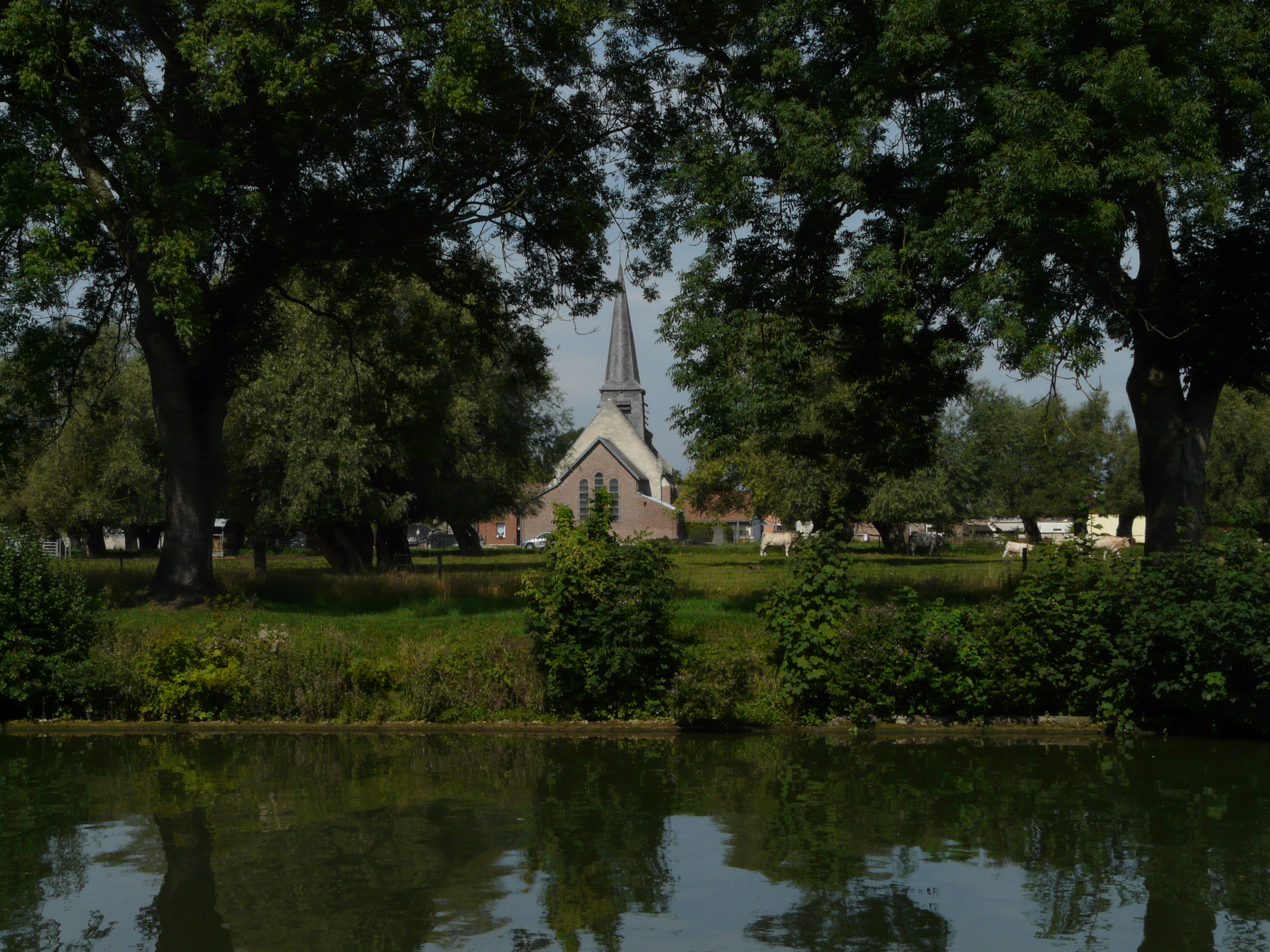
- The church in Ramillies

- Coat of arms
- Location of Ramillies
- Location within France Location within Hauts-de-France
- Coordinates: 50°12′22″N 3°15′41″E
- Country: France
- Region: Hauts-de-France
- Department: Nord
- Arrondissement: Cambrai
- Canton: Cambrai
- Intercommunality: CA Cambrai

Government
  - Mayor (2020–2026): Olivier Delsaux
- Area^{1}: 5.11 km^{2} (1.97 sq mi)
- Elevation: 42 m (138 ft)
- Highest elevation: 81 m (266 ft)
- Lowest elevation: 39 m (128 ft)
- Population (2023): 579
  - Density: 113/km^{2} (293/sq mi)
- Time zone: UTC+01:00 (CET)
  - Summer (DST): UTC+02:00 (CEST)
- INSEE/Postal code: 59492 /59161
- ^{1} French Land Register data, which excludes lakes, ponds, glaciers > 1 km^{2} (0.386 sq mi or 247 acres) and river estuaries.

Ramillies is a commune in the Nord department in northern France.

== Heraldry ==
Arms of Ramillies	The arms of Ramillies are blazoned : Azure, a wyvern Or, langued gules. (Bévillers, Honnechy, Ramillies and Wambaix use the same arms.)

== See also ==
- Communes of the Nord department
