= Le Cateau-Cambrésis =

- Commune
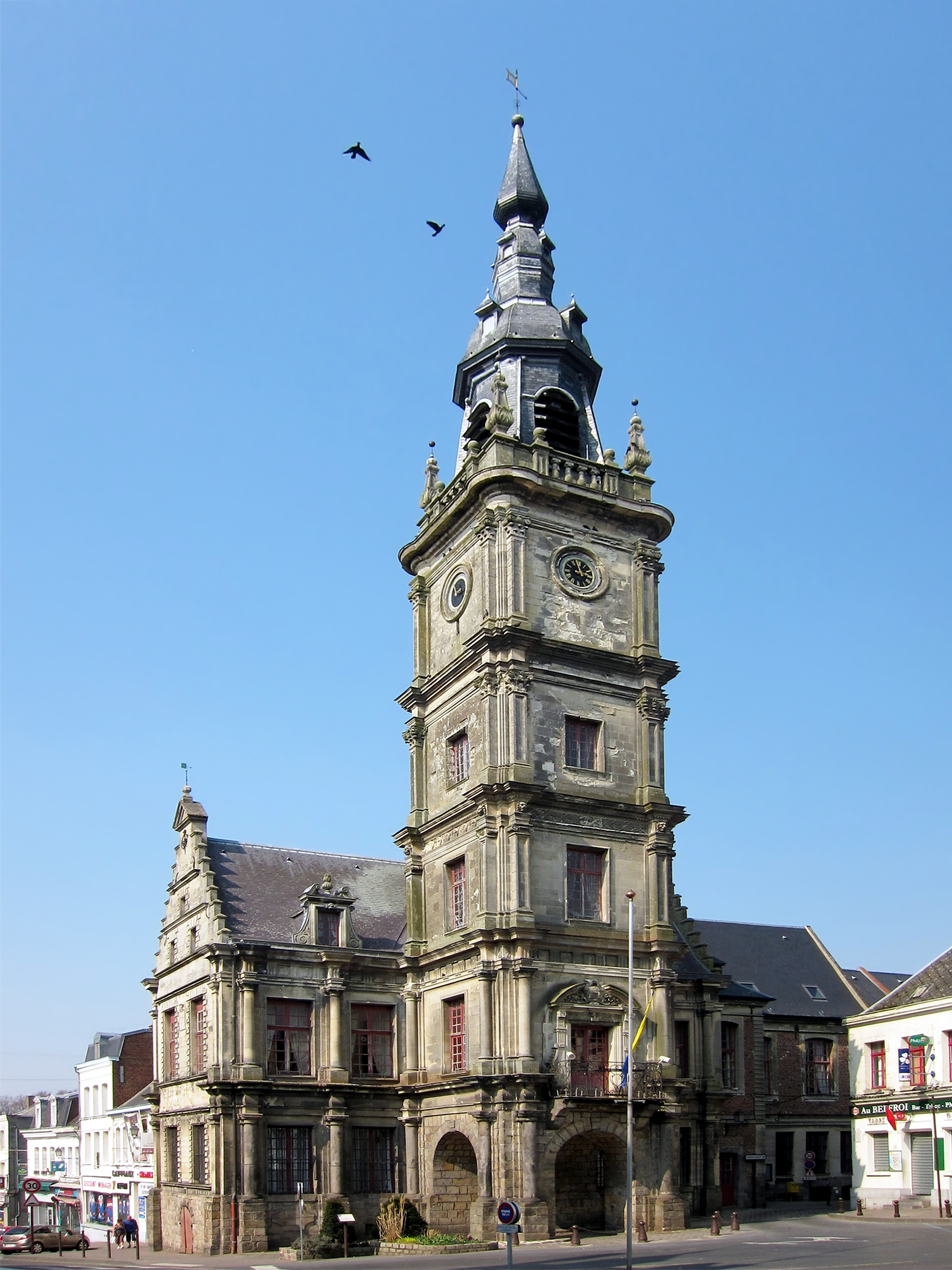
- Belfry of Le Cateau

- Coat of arms
- Location of Le Cateau-Cambrésis
- Location within France Location within Hauts-de-France
- Coordinates: 50°06′15″N 3°32′40″E
- Country: France
- Region: Hauts-de-France
- Department: Nord
- Arrondissement: Cambrai
- Canton: Le Cateau-Cambrésis
- Intercommunality: CA Caudrésis–Catésis

Government
  - Mayor (2020–2026): Serge Siméon
- Area^{1}: 27.24 km^{2} (10.52 sq mi)
- Elevation: 96 m (315 ft)
- Highest elevation: 157 m (515 ft)
- Lowest elevation: 84 m (276 ft)
- Population (2023): 6,764
  - Density: 248.3/km^{2} (643.1/sq mi)
- Time zone: UTC+01:00 (CET)
  - Summer (DST): UTC+02:00 (CEST)
- INSEE/Postal code: 59136 /59360
- Website: lecateau.fr
- ^{1} French Land Register data, which excludes lakes, ponds, glaciers > 1 km^{2} (0.386 sq mi or 247 acres) and river estuaries.

Le Cateau-Cambrésis (French pronunciation: [lə kato kɑ̃bʁezi], before 1977: Le Cateau) is a commune in the Nord department in northern France. The term Cambrésis indicates that it lies in the county of that name which fell to the Prince-Bishop of Cambrai. Le Cateau station has rail connections to Paris, Maubeuge and Saint-Quentin.

== History ==
- The Peace of Cateau-Cambrésis, ending the Italian Wars, was agreed there on 2–3 April 1559.
- Until 1678, the city belonged to the Spanish Netherlands. France conquered the city officially by the treaty of Nijmegen signed in 1678.
- On 29 March 1794, allied forces defeated French forces at Le Cateau.
- Le Cateau formed the right wing of the front of II Corps of the British Expeditionary Force at the Battle of Le Cateau on 26 August 1914, during its withdrawal from the Battle of Mons.

=== Heraldry ===
Arms of Cateau-Cambrésis	The arms of Cateau-Cambrésis are blazoned : Azure, a 3-towered castle or.

== Population ==
Historical population
Year	Pop.	±% p.a.
1968	9,114	—
1975	8,804	−0.49%
1982	8,256	−0.91%
1990	7,703	−0.86%
1999	7,460	−0.36%
2007	7,102	−0.61%
2012	7,058	−0.12%
2017	6,933	−0.36%
2023	6,764	−0.41%
Source: INSEE

== Climate ==
Le Cateau-Cambrésis can be described as having a temperate oceanic climate; summers do normally not reach high average temperatures, while winters can occasionally fall below freezing temperatures, though with averages still well above the freezing mark. Precipitation is plentiful year round.

The below chart displays climate data for Cambrai, the ancient capital of Cambrésis, located 20 km to the west of Le Cateau-Cambrésis.

Climate data for Cambrai (1991–2020 normals, extremes 1954–present)
Month	Jan	Feb	Mar	Apr	May	Jun	Jul	Aug	Sep	Oct	Nov	Dec	Year
Record high °C (°F)	14.9 (58.8)	18.6 (65.5)	23.3 (73.9)	27.6 (81.7)	30.9 (87.6)	34.7 (94.5)	41.8 (107.2)	38.2 (100.8)	34.7 (94.5)	28.6 (83.5)	19.5 (67.1)	16.2 (61.2)	41.8 (107.2)
Mean daily maximum °C (°F)	6.2 (43.2)	7.3 (45.1)	11.1 (52.0)	15.0 (59.0)	18.4 (65.1)	21.4 (70.5)	23.8 (74.8)	23.8 (74.8)	20.3 (68.5)	15.3 (59.5)	10.0 (50.0)	6.7 (44.1)	14.9 (58.8)
Daily mean °C (°F)	3.8 (38.8)	4.4 (39.9)	7.2 (45.0)	10.1 (50.2)	13.5 (56.3)	16.4 (61.5)	18.6 (65.5)	18.6 (65.5)	15.5 (59.9)	11.6 (52.9)	7.2 (45.0)	4.4 (39.9)	10.9 (51.6)
Mean daily minimum °C (°F)	1.3 (34.3)	1.5 (34.7)	3.3 (37.9)	5.2 (41.4)	8.6 (47.5)	11.4 (52.5)	13.4 (56.1)	13.3 (55.9)	10.8 (51.4)	8.0 (46.4)	4.5 (40.1)	2.0 (35.6)	6.9 (44.4)
Record low °C (°F)	−19.8 (−3.6)	−17.2 (1.0)	−11.4 (11.5)	−4.5 (23.9)	−1.3 (29.7)	1.2 (34.2)	4.5 (40.1)	5.0 (41.0)	0.8 (33.4)	−5.4 (22.3)	−9.0 (15.8)	−12.8 (9.0)	−19.8 (−3.6)
Average precipitation mm (inches)	54.1 (2.13)	47.9 (1.89)	50.0 (1.97)	42.7 (1.68)	56.7 (2.23)	63.7 (2.51)	67.7 (2.67)	67.7 (2.67)	56.5 (2.22)	63.6 (2.50)	62.6 (2.46)	69.7 (2.74)	702.9 (27.67)
Average precipitation days (≥ 1.0 mm)	10.9	10.4	9.9	8.9	9.6	9.3	9.8	9.4	9.3	10.8	12.1	12.2	122.7
Source: Meteociel

== Matisse Museum ==
The Musée Départemental Henri Matisse installed in the Palais Fénelon in the center of Le Cateau boasts the third largest collection of Matisse works in France.

== Notable people ==
Births:

- Henri Matisse, artist
- Marshal Mortier
- Pierre Nord
- Raymond Poïvet, one of the creators of the French science fiction comics Les Pionniers de l'Espérance

Pierre Mauroy was a high school student in Le Cateau, and later its representative at the general council for the Nord department.

Arthur Henri Lefort Des Ylouses, artist

== Gallery ==
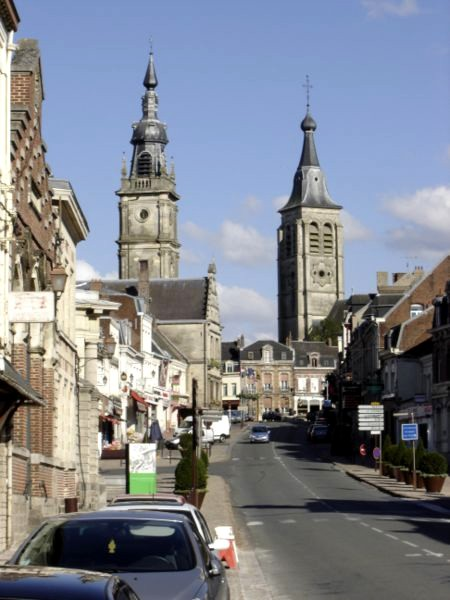

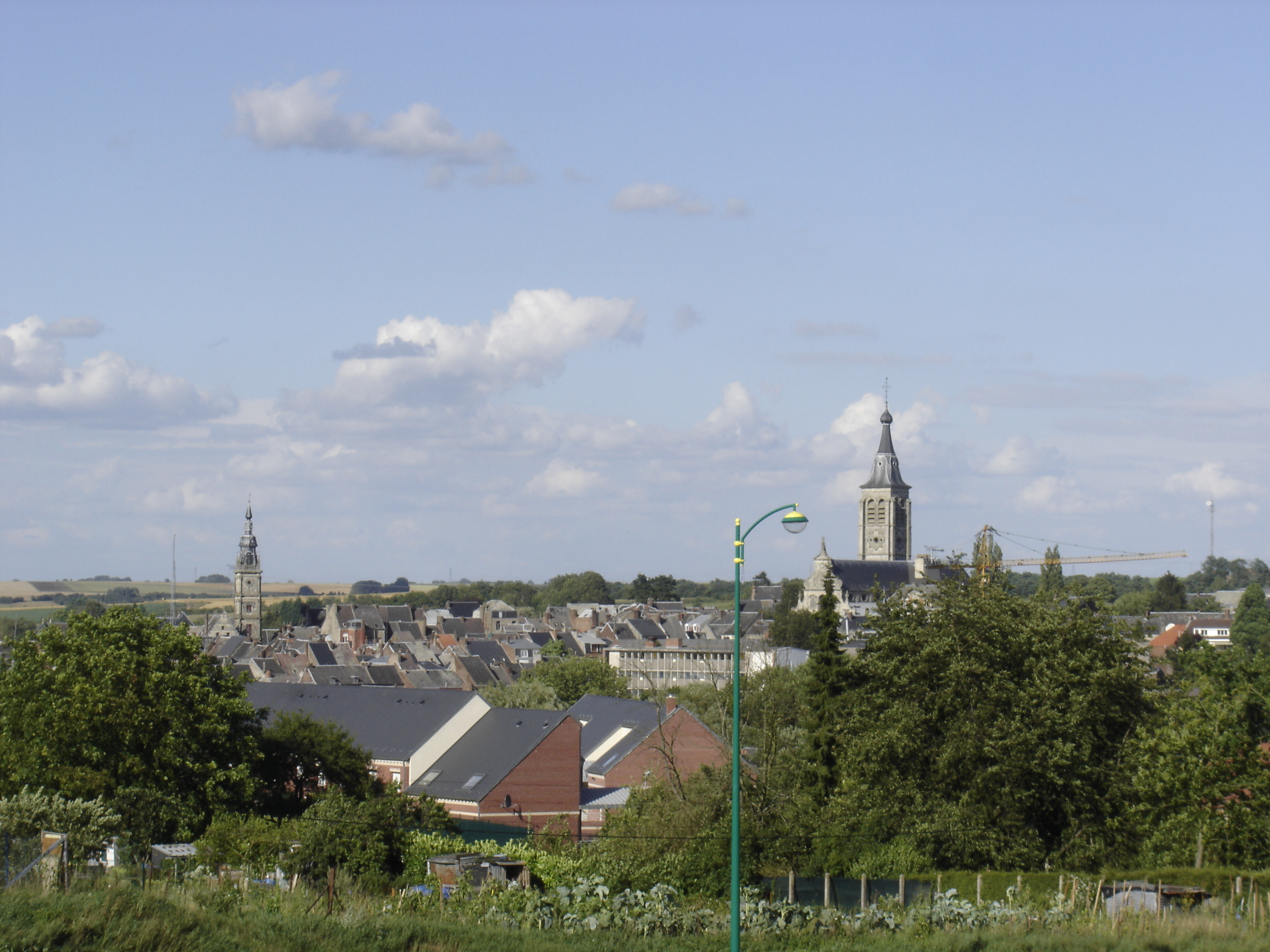

== See also ==
- Communes of the Nord department
