= Wambaix =

- Commune
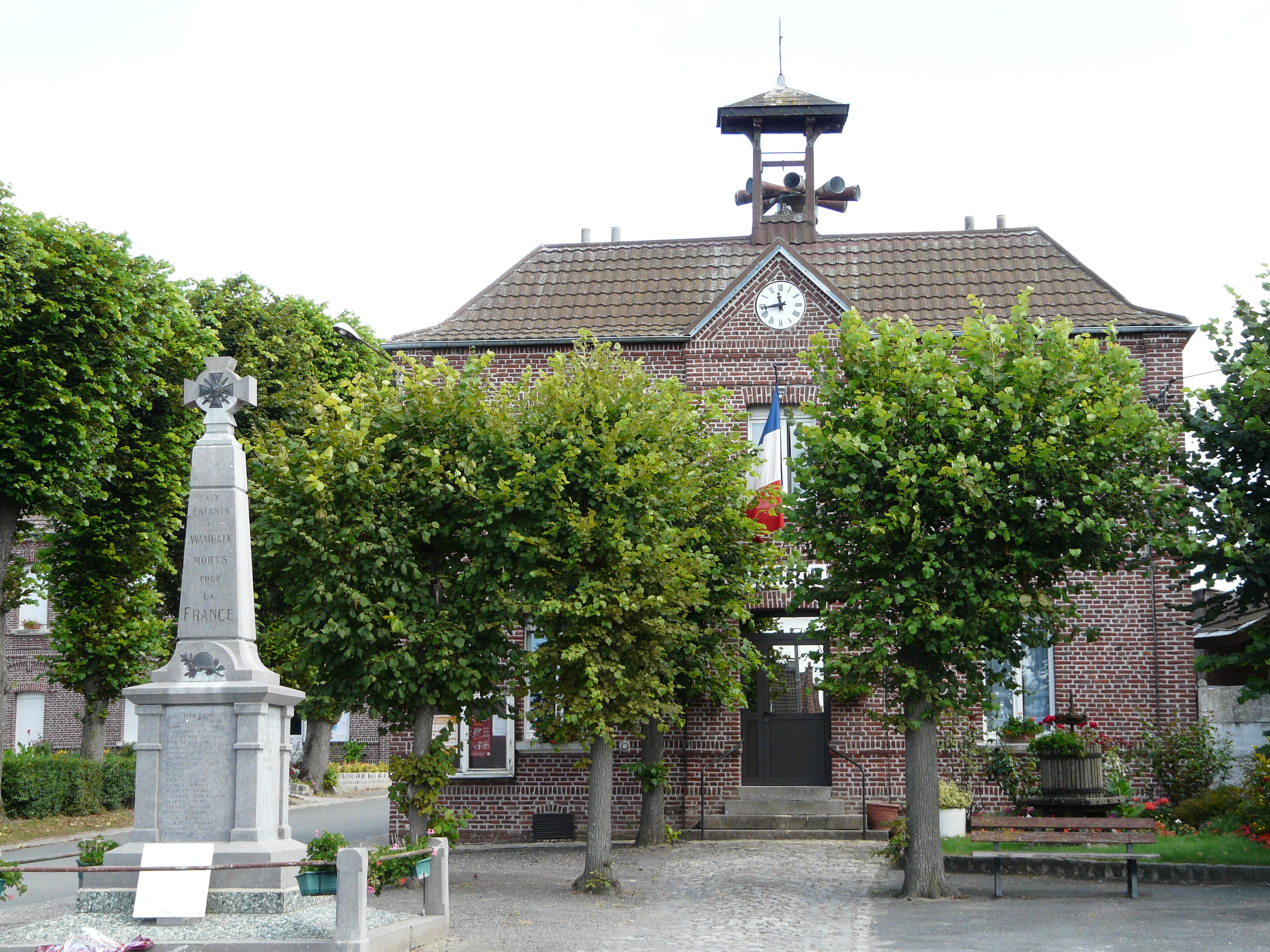
- The town hall in Wambaix

- Coat of arms
- Location of Wambaix
- Location within France Location within Hauts-de-France
- Coordinates: 50°07′47″N 3°18′21″E
- Country: France
- Region: Hauts-de-France
- Department: Nord
- Arrondissement: Cambrai
- Canton: Le Cateau-Cambrésis
- Intercommunality: Cambrai

Government
  - Mayor (2020–2026): Romain Manesse
- Area^{1}: 6.17 km^{2} (2.38 sq mi)
- Elevation: 102 m (335 ft)
- Highest elevation: 123 m (404 ft)
- Lowest elevation: 75 m (246 ft)
- Population (2023): 381
  - Density: 61.8/km^{2} (160/sq mi)
- Time zone: UTC+01:00 (CET)
  - Summer (DST): UTC+02:00 (CEST)
- INSEE/Postal code: 59635 /59400
- ^{1} French Land Register data, which excludes lakes, ponds, glaciers > 1 km^{2} (0.386 sq mi or 247 acres) and river estuaries.

Wambaix (French pronunciation: [wɑ̃bɛ]) is a commune in the Nord department in northern France. Wambaix station has rail connections to Douai, Cambrai and Saint-Quentin.

== Heraldry ==
Arms of Wambaix	The arms of Wambaix are blazoned : Azure, a wyvern Or, langued gules. (Bévillers, Honnechy, Ramillies and Wambaix use the same arms.)

== Population ==
Historical population
Year	Pop.	±% p.a.
1968	345	—
1975	298	−2.07%
1982	334	+1.64%
1990	346	+0.44%
1999	332	−0.46%
2007	302	−1.18%
2012	331	+1.85%
2017	374	+2.47%
2023	381	+0.31%
Source: INSEE

== See also ==
- Communes of the Nord department
