= Bertry =

- Commune
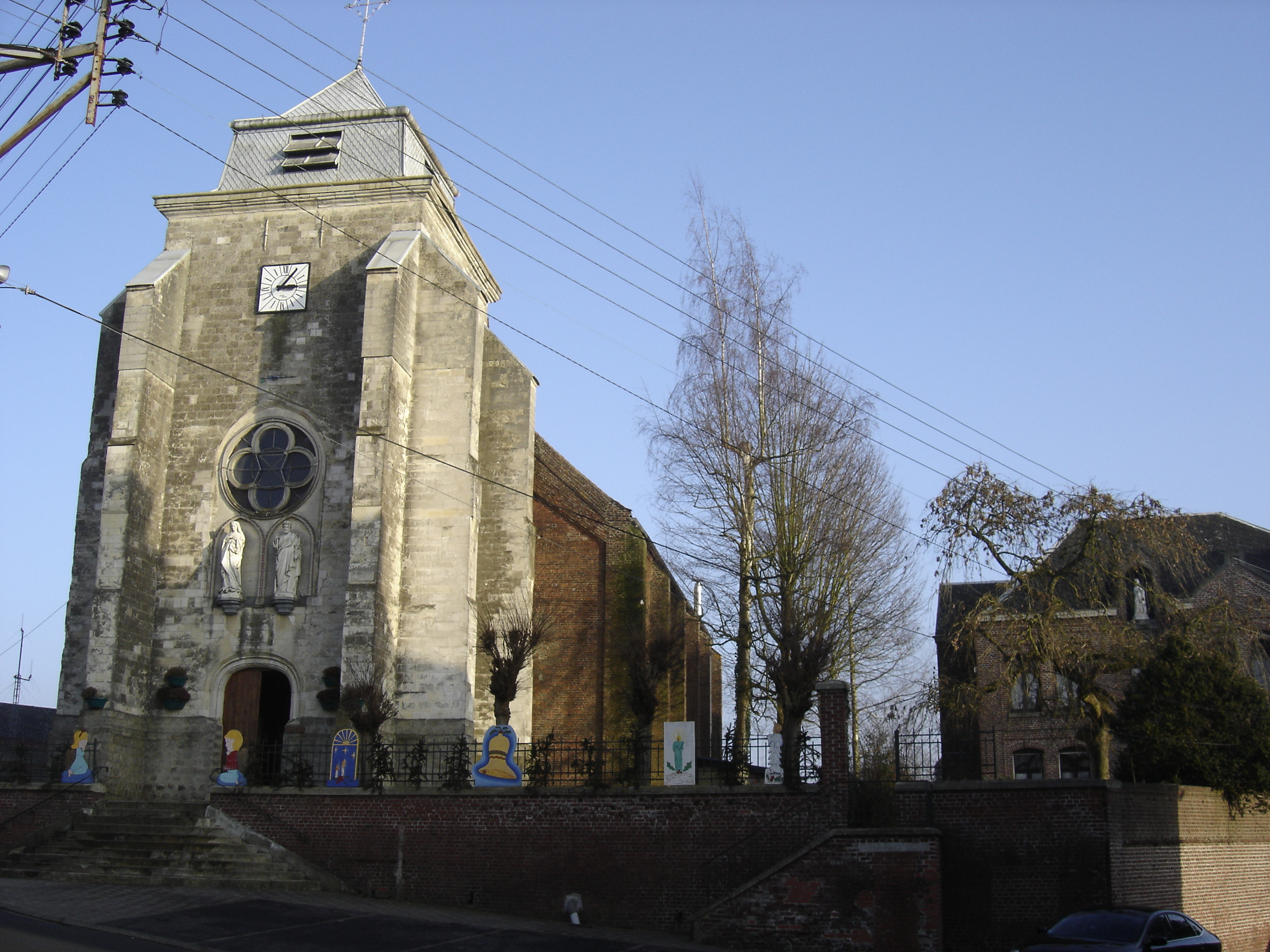
- The church in Bertry

- Coat of arms
- Location of Bertry
- Location within France Location within Hauts-de-France
- Coordinates: 50°05′16″N 3°26′36″E
- Country: France
- Region: Hauts-de-France
- Department: Nord
- Arrondissement: Cambrai
- Canton: Le Cateau-Cambrésis
- Intercommunality: CA Caudrésis–Catésis

Government
  - Mayor (2020–2026): Jacques Olivier
- Area^{1}: 8.54 km^{2} (3.30 sq mi)
- Elevation: 131 m (430 ft)
- Highest elevation: 152 m (499 ft)
- Lowest elevation: 119 m (390 ft)
- Population (2023): 2,140
  - Density: 251/km^{2} (649/sq mi)
- Time zone: UTC+01:00 (CET)
  - Summer (DST): UTC+02:00 (CEST)
- INSEE/Postal code: 59074 /59980
- ^{1} French Land Register data, which excludes lakes, ponds, glaciers > 1 km^{2} (0.386 sq mi or 247 acres) and river estuaries.

Bertry (French pronunciation: [bɛʁtʁi]) is a commune in the Nord, which is known as the most populous department in northern France. Bertry station has rail connections to Douai and Saint-Quentin.

== Population ==
Historical population

Year	Pop.	±% p.a.
1793	1,169	—
1821	1,332	+0.47%
1846	2,273	+2.16%
1872	3,010	+1.09%
1901	3,031	+0.02%
1926	3,009	−0.03%
1946	2,640	−0.65%
1962	2,657	+0.04%
1968	2,526	−0.84%

Year	Pop.	±% p.a.
1975	2,295	−1.36%
1982	2,089	−1.33%
1990	2,119	+0.18%
1999	2,257	+0.70%
2007	2,212	−0.25%
2012	2,255	+0.39%
2017	2,177	−0.70%
2023	2,140	−0.29%

Source: EHESS and INSEE (1968–2023)

== Heraldry ==
Arms of Bertry	The arms of Bertry are blazoned : Azure, a chevron between 2 mullets of 6 and a trefoil Or. (Bertry and Troisvilles use the same arms.)

== See also ==
- Communes of the Nord department
