= Honnechy =

- Commune
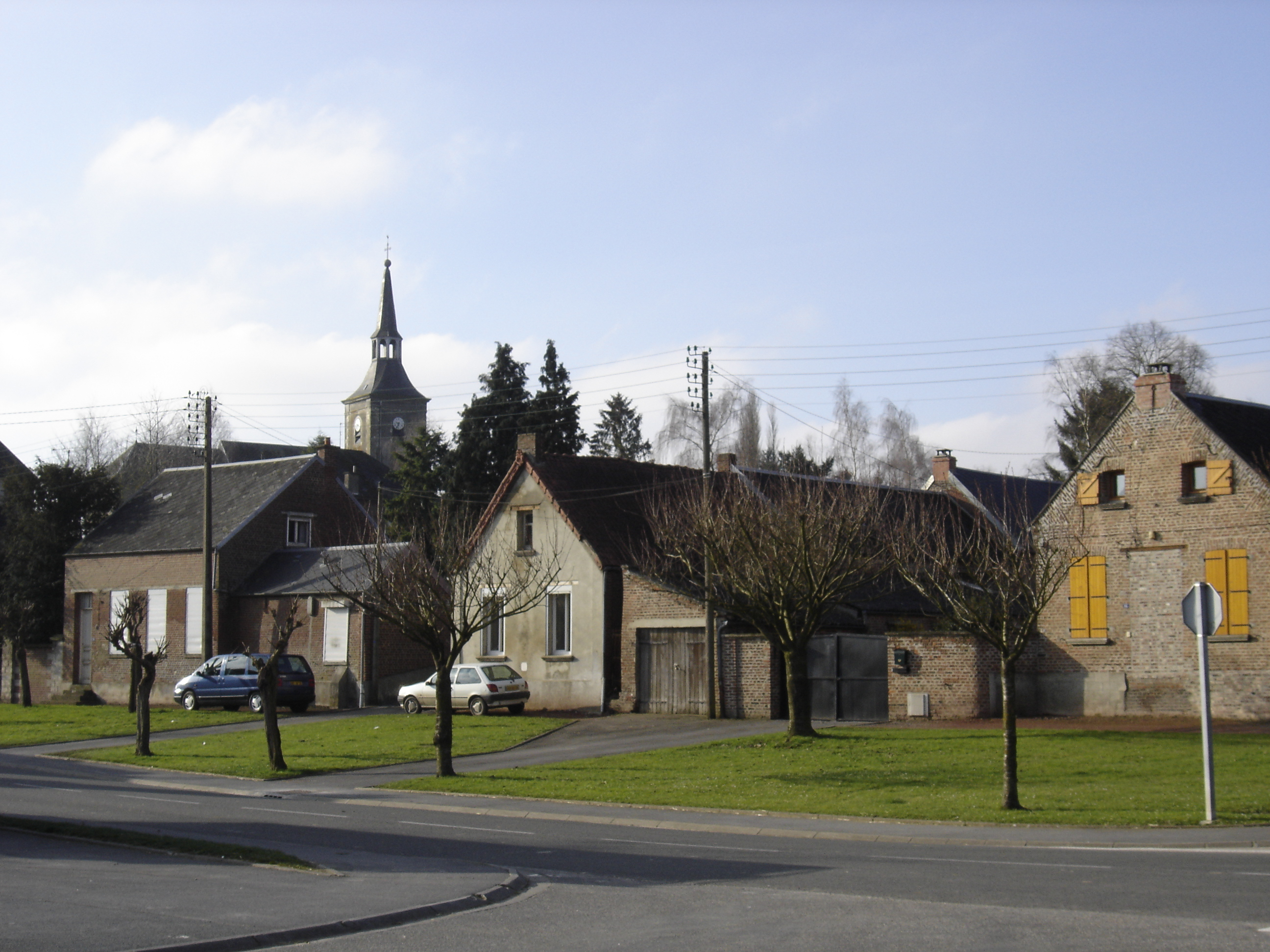
- A view within Honnechy

- Coat of arms
- Location of Honnechy
- Location within France Location within Hauts-de-France
- Coordinates: 50°04′09″N 3°28′20″E
- Country: France
- Region: Hauts-de-France
- Department: Nord
- Arrondissement: Cambrai
- Canton: Le Cateau-Cambrésis
- Intercommunality: CA Caudrésis–Catésis

Government
  - Mayor (2020–2026): Bertrand Lefebvre
- Area^{1}: 6.53 km^{2} (2.52 sq mi)
- Highest elevation: 151 m (495 ft)
- Lowest elevation: 113 m (371 ft)
- Population (2023): 541
  - Density: 82.8/km^{2} (215/sq mi)
- Time zone: UTC+01:00 (CET)
  - Summer (DST): UTC+02:00 (CEST)
- INSEE/Postal code: 59311 /59360
- ^{1} French Land Register data, which excludes lakes, ponds, glaciers > 1 km^{2} (0.386 sq mi or 247 acres) and river estuaries.

Honnechy (French pronunciation: [ɔnʃi]) is a commune in the Nord department in northern France.

== Heraldry ==
Arms of Honnechy	The arms of Honnechy are blazoned : Azure, a wyvern Or, langued gules. (Bévillers, Honnechy, Ramillies and Wambaix use the same arms.)

== See also ==
- Communes of the Nord department
