= Cambrai station =

Railway station in France

Coordinates: 50°10′36″N 3°14′29″E

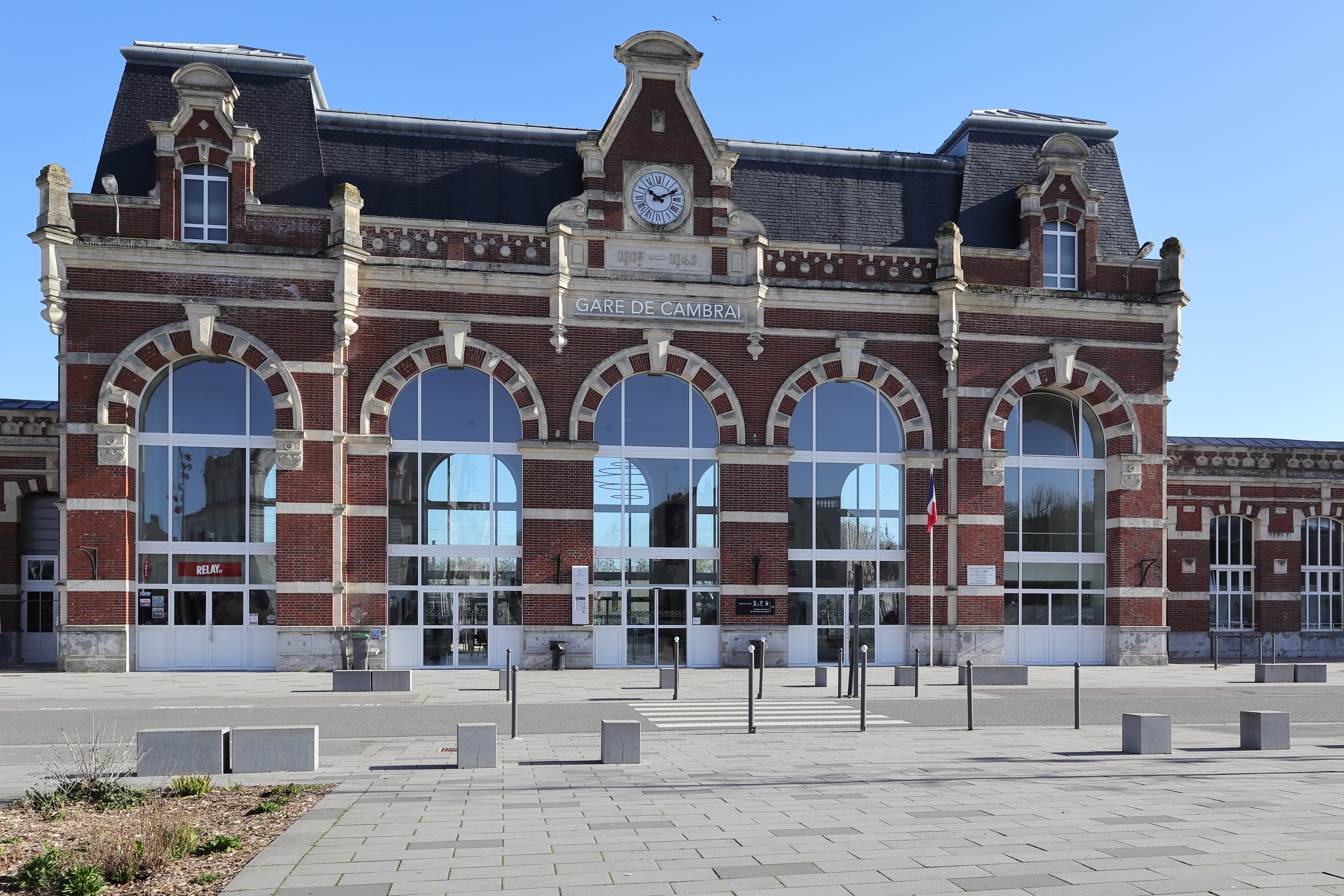
Cambrai station

Cambrai is a railway station serving the town of Cambrai, Nord department, in northern France.

== Services ==
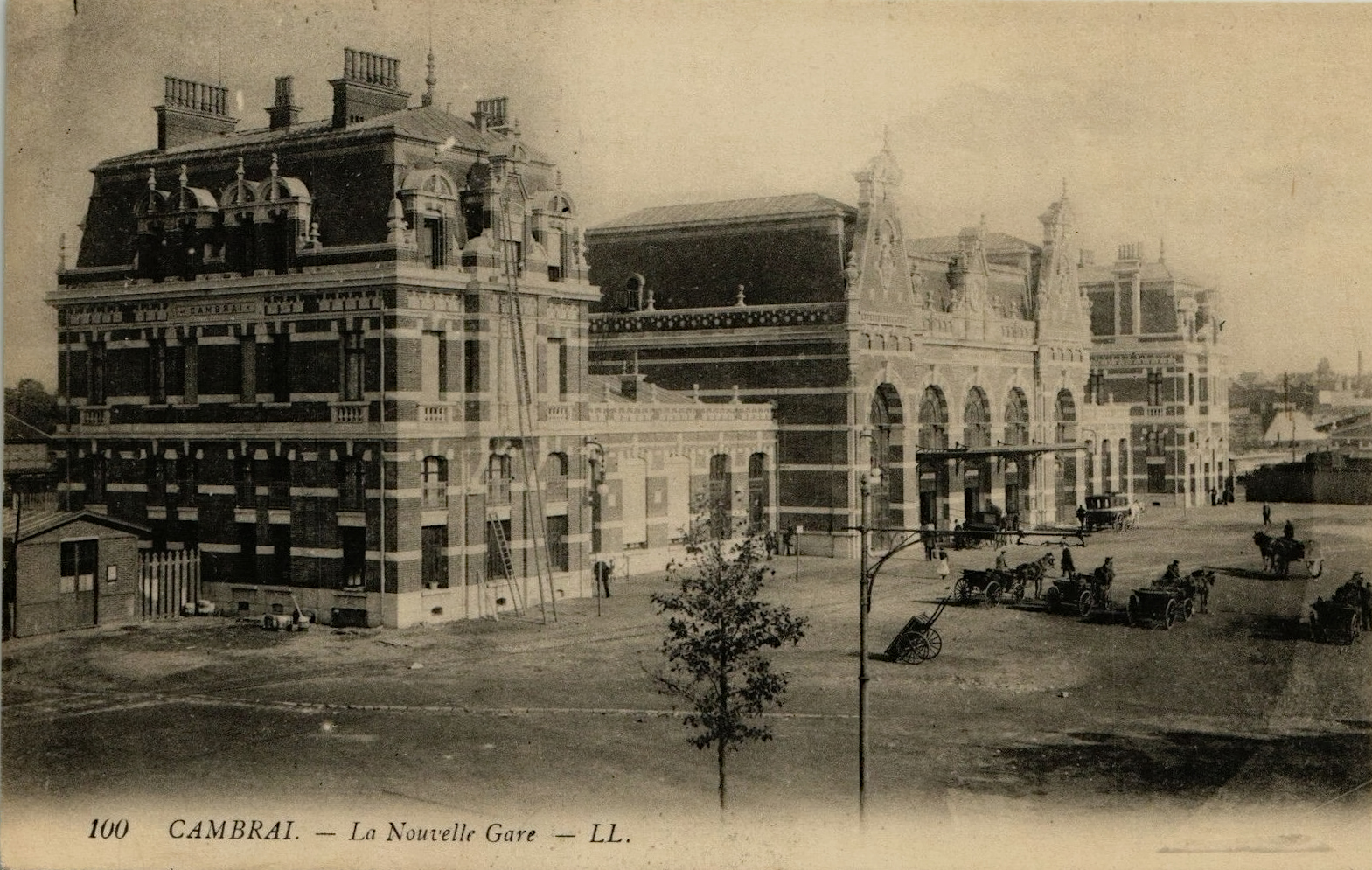
Before 1914

The station is served by regional trains to Douai, Valenciennes, Saint-Quentin and Lille.

Preceding station	TER Hauts-de-France	Following station
Terminus	Krono K13	Caudry towards Paris-Nord
Somain towards Lille-Flandres	Krono K40	Caudry towards Saint-Quentin
Aubigny-au-Bac towards Douai	Proxi P40	Wambaix towards Saint-Quentin
Escaudœuvres towards Valenciennes	Proxi P63	Terminus
