= Cattenières =

- Commune
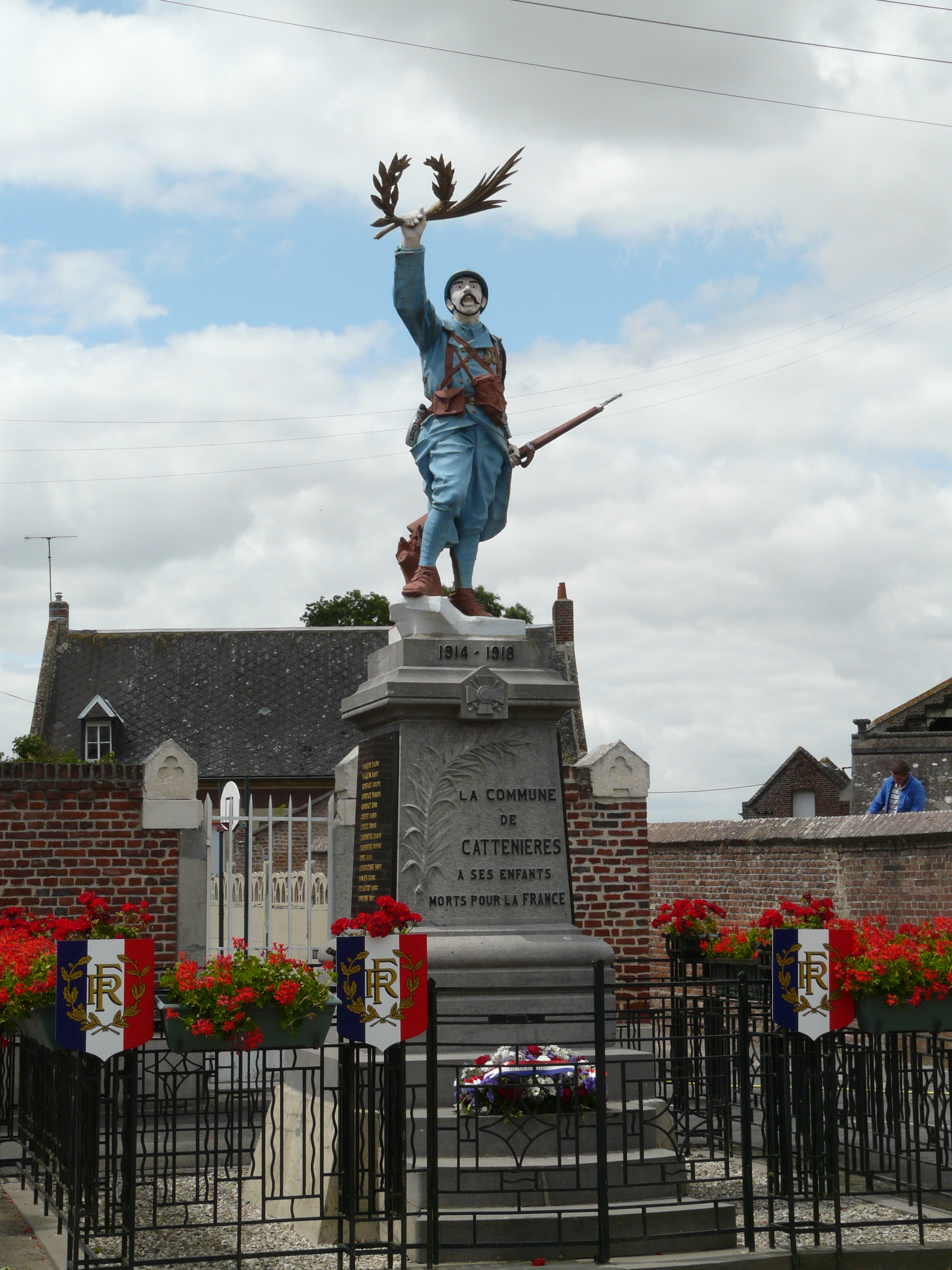
- The war memorial in Cattenières

- Coat of arms
- Location of Cattenières
- Location within France Location within Hauts-de-France
- Coordinates: 50°08′16″N 3°20′01″E
- Country: France
- Region: Hauts-de-France
- Department: Nord
- Arrondissement: Cambrai
- Canton: Le Cateau-Cambrésis
- Intercommunality: CA Caudrésis–Catésis

Government
  - Mayor (2020–2026): Daniel Forrieres
- Area^{1}: 5.4 km^{2} (2.1 sq mi)
- Elevation: 101 m (331 ft)
- Highest elevation: 124 m (407 ft)
- Lowest elevation: 82 m (269 ft)
- Population (2023): 689
  - Density: 130/km^{2} (330/sq mi)
- Time zone: UTC+01:00 (CET)
  - Summer (DST): UTC+02:00 (CEST)
- INSEE/Postal code: 59138 /59217
- ^{1} French Land Register data, which excludes lakes, ponds, glaciers > 1 km^{2} (0.386 sq mi or 247 acres) and river estuaries.

Cattenières (French pronunciation: [katnjɛʁ]) is a commune of the Nord department in northern France. Cattenières station has rail connections to Douai and Saint-Quentin.

== See also ==
- Communes of the Nord department
