= Saint-Quentin station =

Railway station in Saint-Quentin, France

Coordinates: 49°50′23″N 3°17′50″E

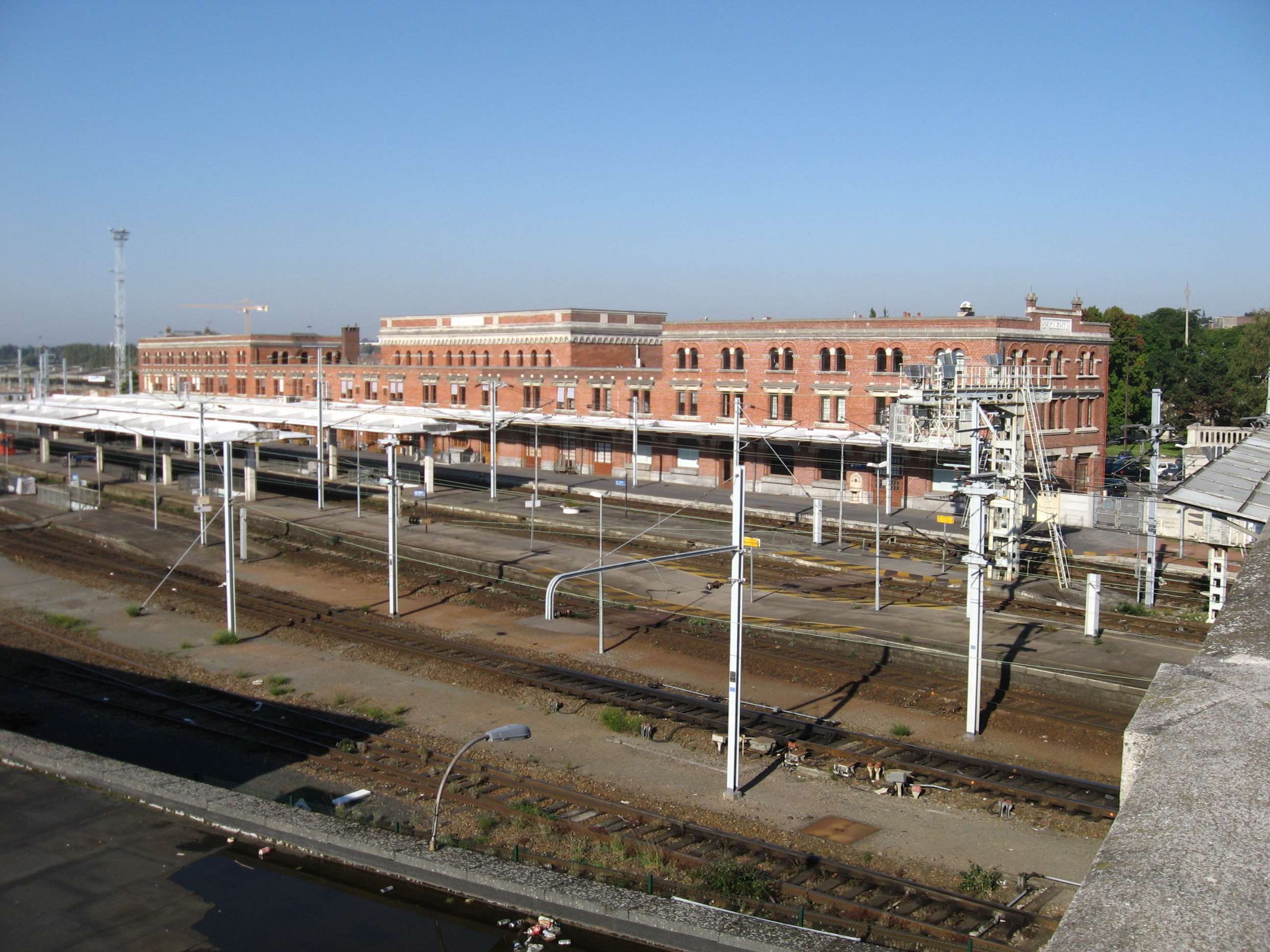
Saint-Quentin station

Saint-Quentin station (French: Gare de Saint-Quentin) is a railway station serving the town Saint-Quentin, Aisne department, northern France. It is situated on the Creil–Jeumont railway.

The station is served by regional trains to Compiègne, Amiens, Cambrai and Paris.

Preceding station	TER Hauts-de-France	Following station
Busigny towards Cambrai or Maubeuge	Krono K13	Compiègne towards Paris-Nord
Terminus	Krono K14	Tergnier towards Paris-Nord
Ham (Somme) towards Amiens	Krono K20	Terminus
Busigny towards Lille-Flandres	Krono K40	Terminus
Terminus	Proxi P14	Montescourt towards Compiègne
Fresnoy-le-Grand towards Douai	Proxi P40	Terminus
Terminus	Proxi P62	Fresnoy-le-Grand towards Aulnoye-Aymeries
