= Carnières =

- Commune
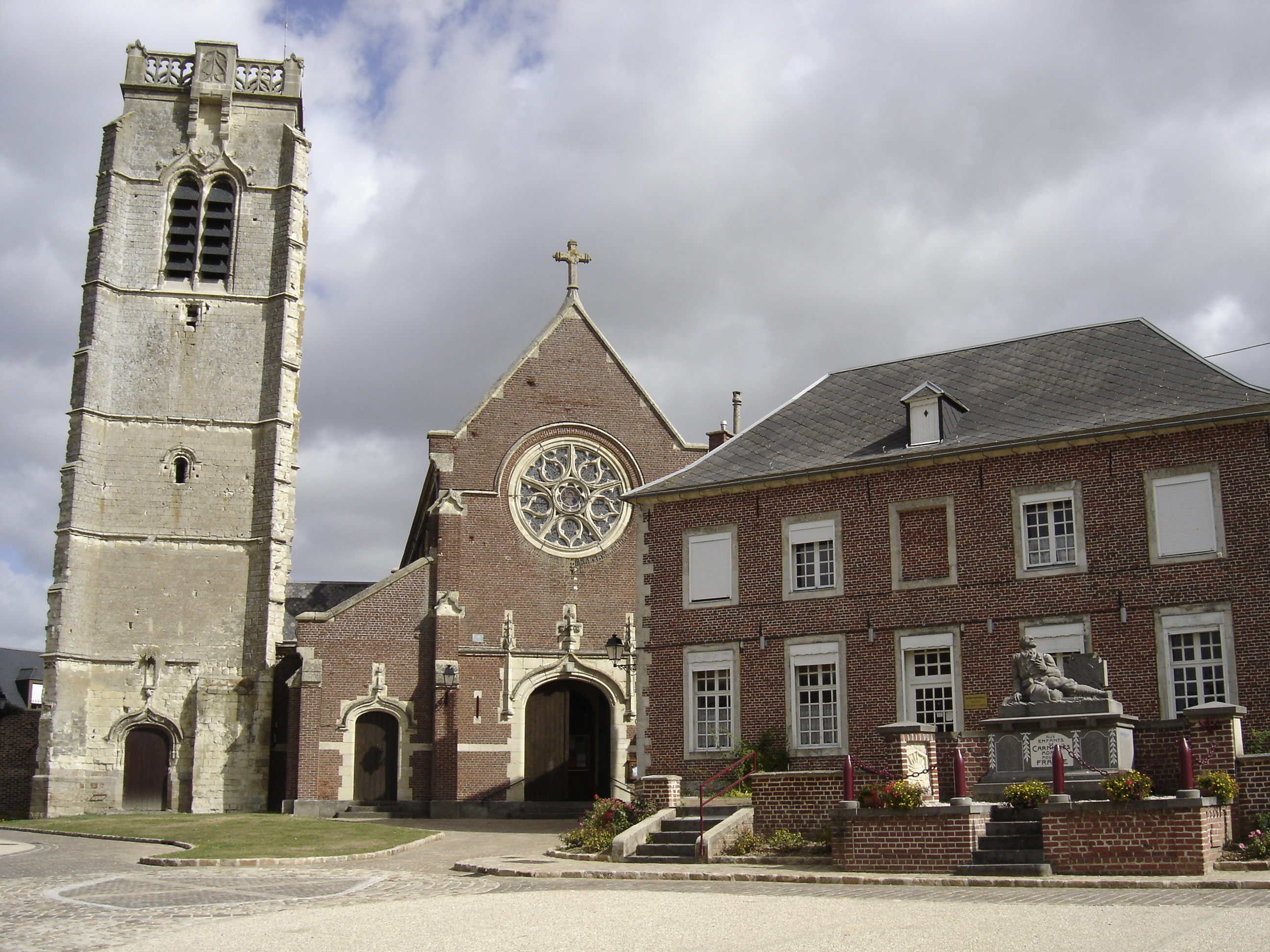
- The centre of Carnières

- Coat of arms
- Location of Carnières
- Location within France Location within Hauts-de-France
- Coordinates: 50°10′07″N 3°20′51″E
- Country: France
- Region: Hauts-de-France
- Department: Nord
- Arrondissement: Cambrai
- Canton: Caudry
- Intercommunality: CA Caudrésis–Catésis

Government
  - Mayor (2020–2026): Sandrine Hotton
- Area^{1}: 8.13 km^{2} (3.14 sq mi)
- Elevation: 80 m (260 ft)
- Highest elevation: 104 m (341 ft)
- Lowest elevation: 58 m (190 ft)
- Population (2023): 983
  - Density: 121/km^{2} (313/sq mi)
- Time zone: UTC+01:00 (CET)
  - Summer (DST): UTC+02:00 (CEST)
- INSEE/Postal code: 59132 /59217
- ^{1} French Land Register data, which excludes lakes, ponds, glaciers > 1 km^{2} (0.386 sq mi or 247 acres) and river estuaries.

Carnières (French pronunciation: [kaʁnjɛʁ]) is a commune in the Nord department in northern France.

It is about 7 km (4.3 mi) east of Cambrai.

== Heraldry ==
Arms of Carnières	The arms of Carnières are blazoned : Gules, a saltire argent.

== See also ==
- Communes of the Nord department
