= Jussy station =

Railway station in Jussy, France

Jussy
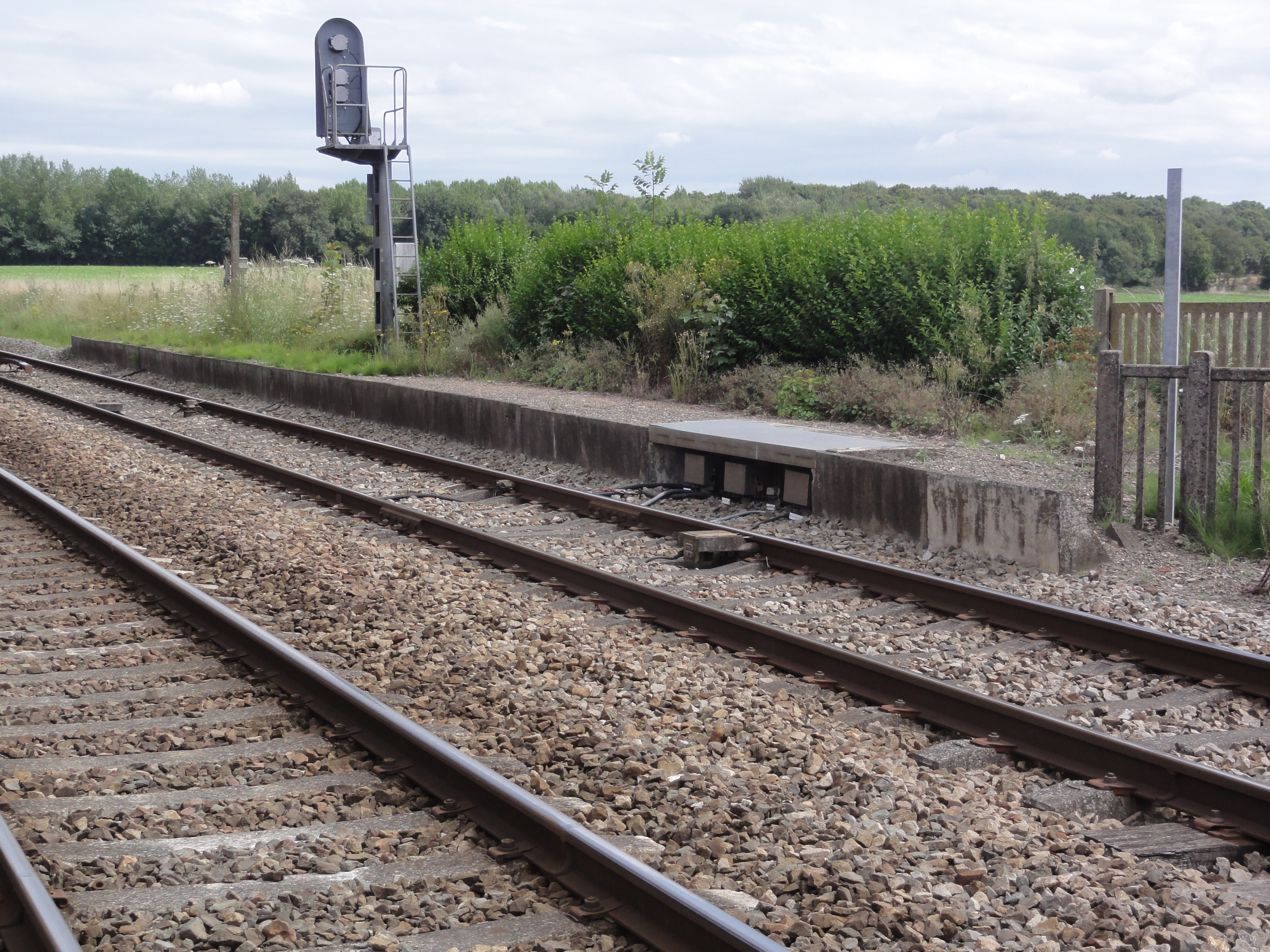

General information
- Location: Rue de l'Emonteau; 02480 Jussy; Aisne; France
- Coordinates: 49°42′43″N 3°13′28″E
- Elevation: 74 m (243 ft)
- Owner: SNCF
- Line: Amiens–Laon railway
- Tracks: 2

Other information
- Status: Closed
- Station code: 87297069

History
- Closed: December 2007
Location

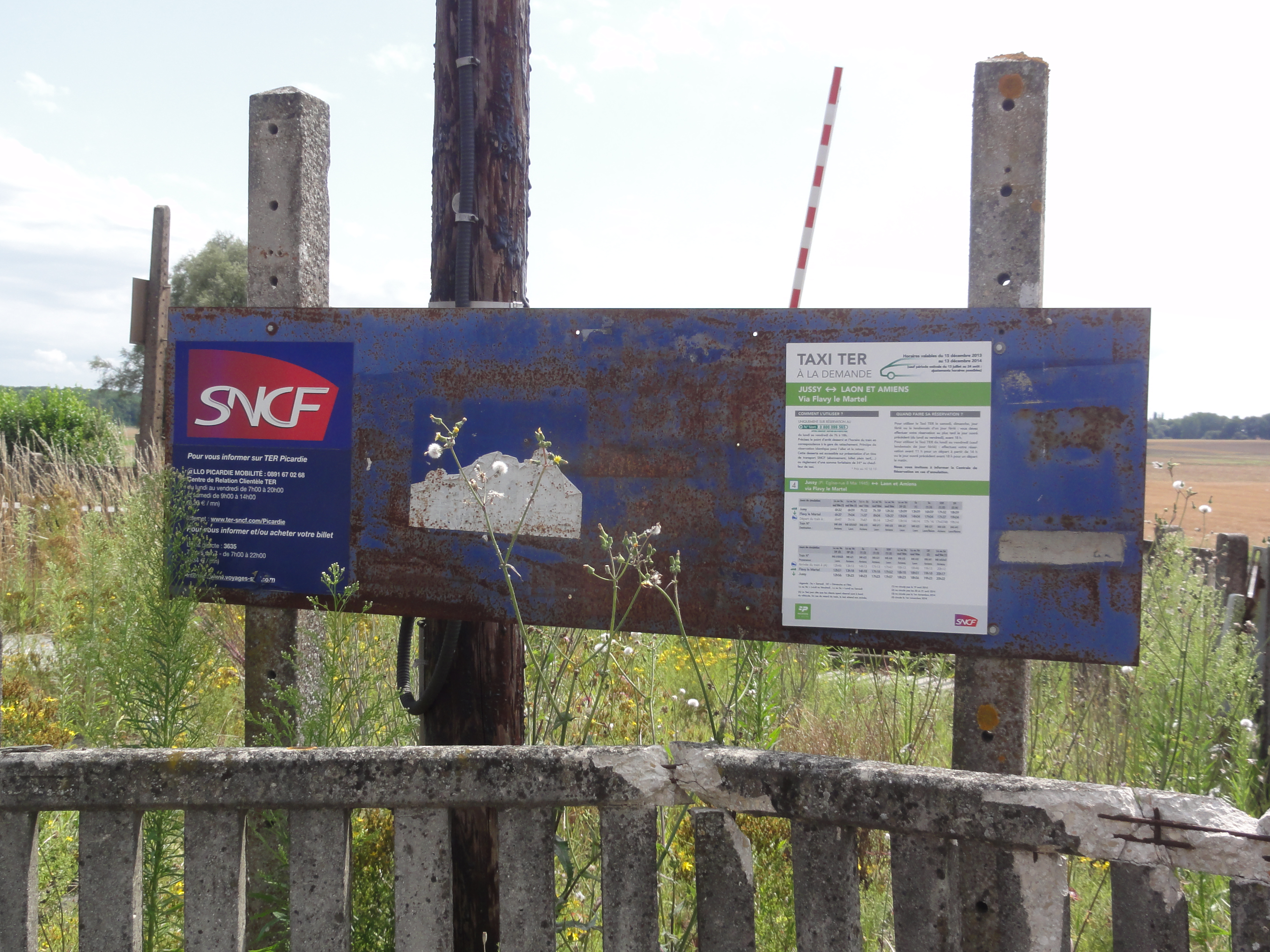
Taxi TER à la demande informational panel at the station

Jussy station (French: Gare de Jussy) is a former railway station located in the commune of Jussy in the Aisne department, France. The station is located on the line from Amiens to Reims, between the stations of Flavy-le-Martel and Mennessis. The station was closed in December 2007, and replaced by a taxi service to Flavy-le-Martel station.

== See also ==
- List of SNCF stations in Hauts-de-France
