= Ham (Somme) station =

Railway station in Muille-Villette, France

Ham
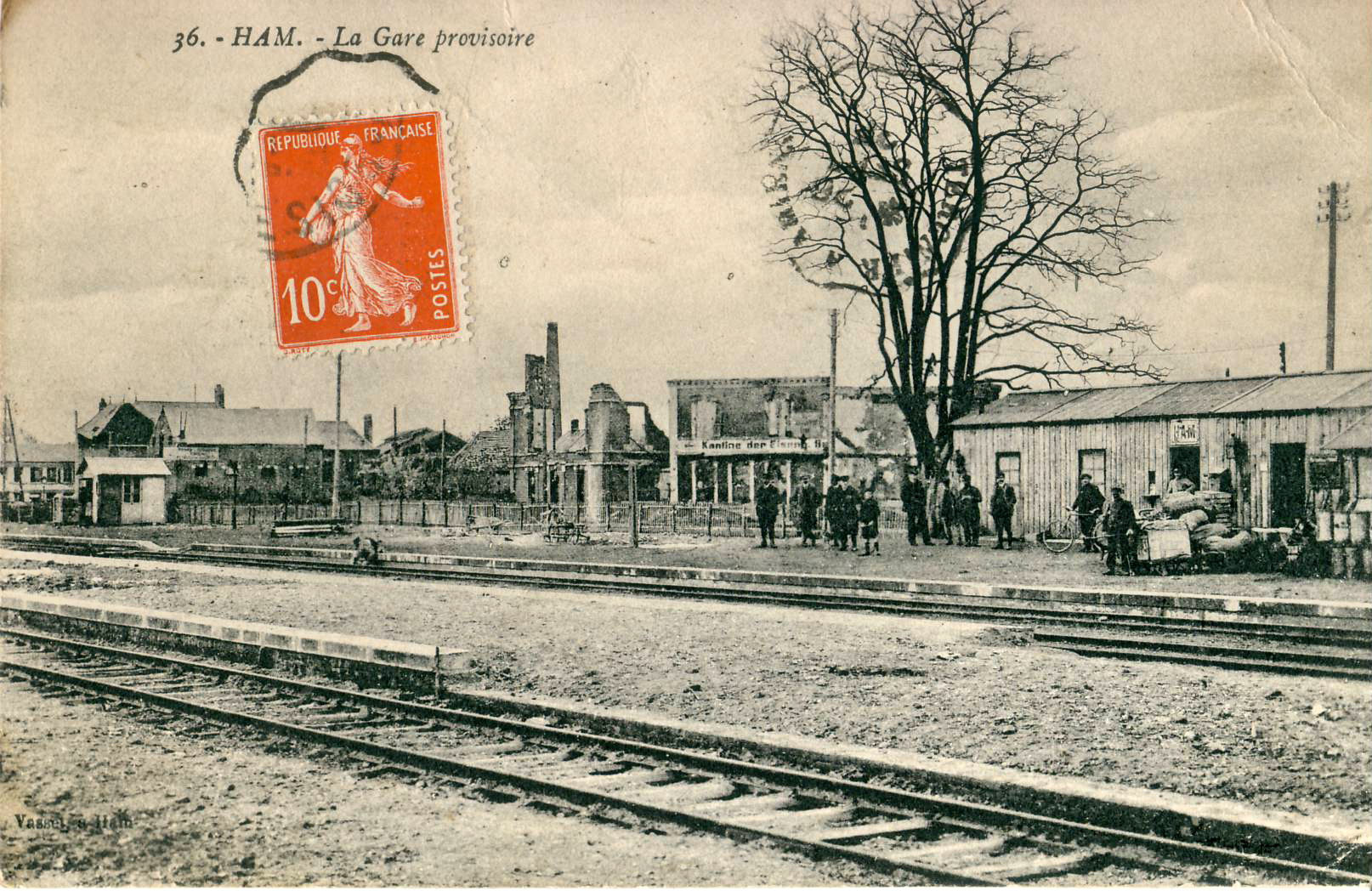
- The provisional station around 1920

General information
- Location: Place de la Gare; Ham 80440
- Coordinates: 49°44′23″N 3°4′11″E
- Owner: RFF/SNCF
- Line: Amiens–Laon railway
- Tracks: 2

Other information
- Station code: 87313494

Services
Preceding station	TER Hauts-de-France	Following station
Amiens Terminus	Krono K20	Saint-Quentin Terminus
Nesle (Somme) towards Amiens	Proxi P20	Flavy-le-Martel towards Laon

Other services
Preceding station	Disused railways	Following station
Terminus	Albert–Ham line Metre gauge	Canisy
Terminus	Ham–Noyon line Metre gauge	Muille-Villette
Location

Ham is a railway station located in the commune of Muille-Villette near Ham in the Somme department, France. The station is served by TER Hauts-de-France trains from Amiens to Laon and to Saint-Quentin.

== History ==
Formerly, the station was also connected with secondary metre gauge rail lines:

- to Noyon via Bussy and Guiscard
- to Albert via Péronne
- to Saint-Quentin

Ham was in the combat area during the Battle of the Somme in World War I and suffered heavy damages. The station was destroyed, and a provisional station was built.

== See also ==
- List of SNCF stations in Hauts-de-France
