= Nesle (Somme) station =

French railway station

Nesle
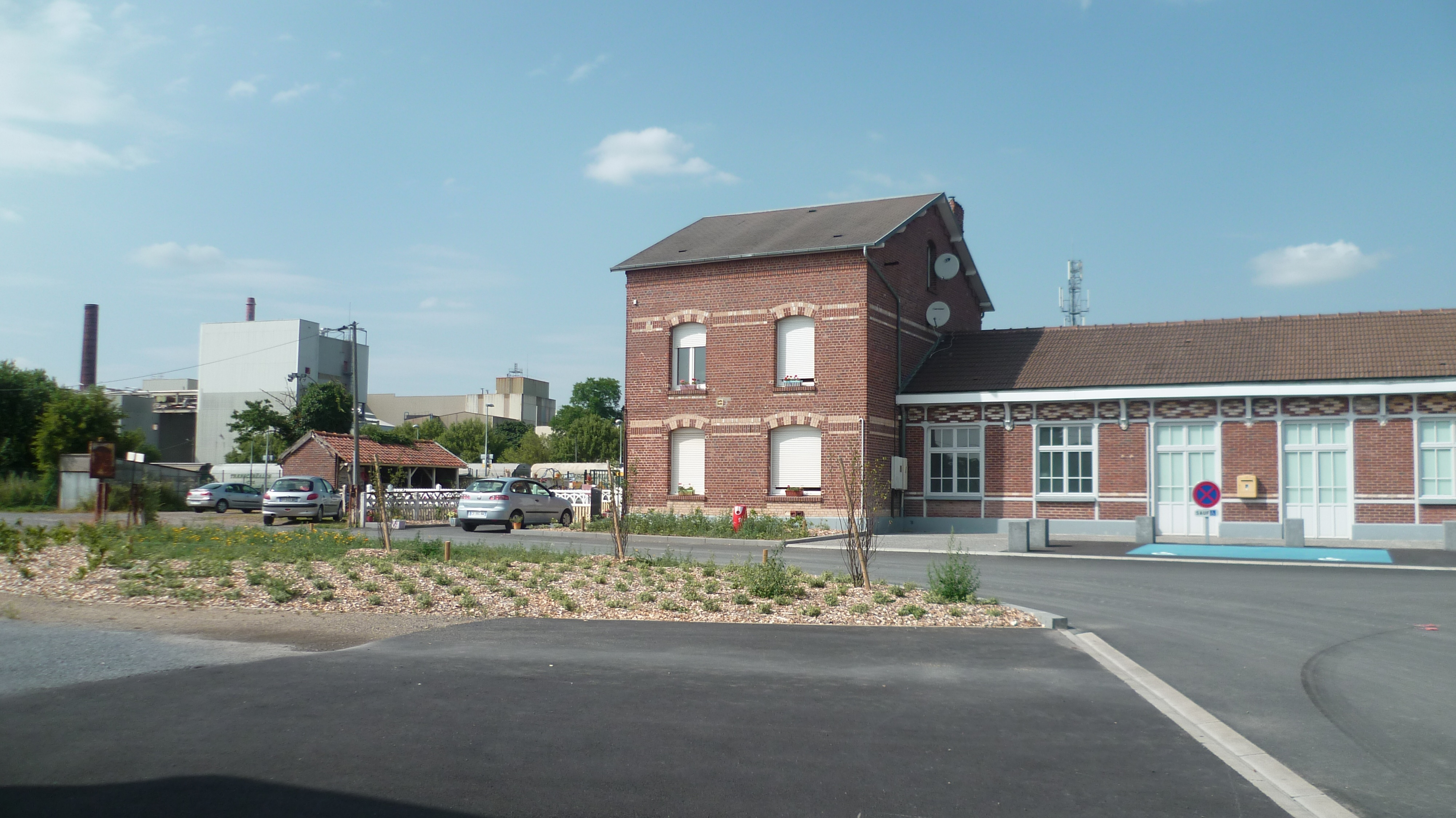

General information
- Location: Nesle
- Coordinates: 49°45′50″N 2°54′34″E
- Owner: SNCF
- Line: Amiens–Laon railway
- Tracks: 2

Other information
- Station code: 87313486

Services
Preceding station	TER Hauts-de-France	Following station
Chaulnes towards Amiens	Proxi P20	Ham (Somme) towards Laon

Other services
Preceding station	Disused railways	Following station
Mesnil-Saint-Nicaise	Offoy–Bussy line Metre gauge	Languevoisin
Location

Nesle is a railway station located in the commune of Nesle in the Somme department, northern France. The station is served by TER Hauts-de-France trains on the line from Amiens to Laon.

== History ==
Formerly, the station was also connected with secondary metre gauge rail lines:

- to Noyon via Bussy and Guiscard
- to Albert via Péronne

== See also ==
- List of SNCF stations in Hauts-de-France
