= Aulnoye-Aymeries station =

Railway station in Aulnoye-Aymeries, France

Coordinates: 50°11′50″N 3°50′36″E

Aulnoye-Aymeries
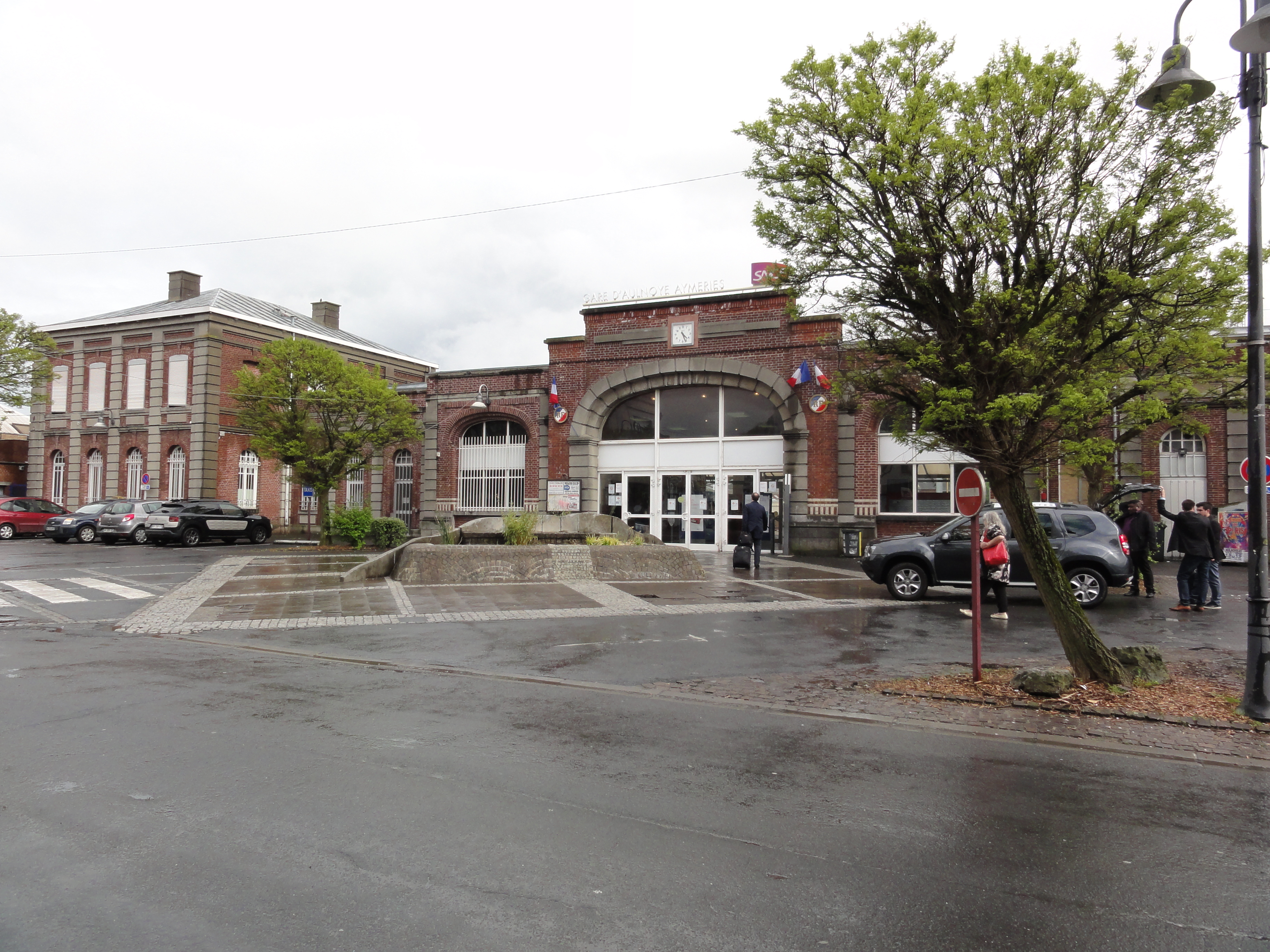

General information
- Location: Place de la Gare; 59620 Aulnoye-Aymeries; Nord, France
- Elevation: 140 m (460 ft)
- Owner: SNCF
- Operator: SNCF
- Lines: Creil–Jeumont railway; Fives–Hirson railway
- Platforms: 4
- Tracks: 7

Other information
- Station code: 87295600

History
- Opened: 21 October 1855
Services
Preceding station	TER Hauts-de-France	Following station
Maubeuge Terminus	Krono K13	Le Cateau towards Paris-Nord
Le Quesnoy towards Lille-Flandres	Krono K60	Maubeuge towards Jeumont
Le Quesnoy towards Lille-Flandres	Krono K61	Avesnes-sur-Helpe towards Charleville-Mézières
Mons Terminus	Krono K81	Terminus
Berlaimont towards Valenciennes	Proxi P60	Hautmont towards Jeumont
Hachette towards Saint-Quentin	Proxi P62	Terminus
Terminus	Proxi P64	Leval towards Laon
Location

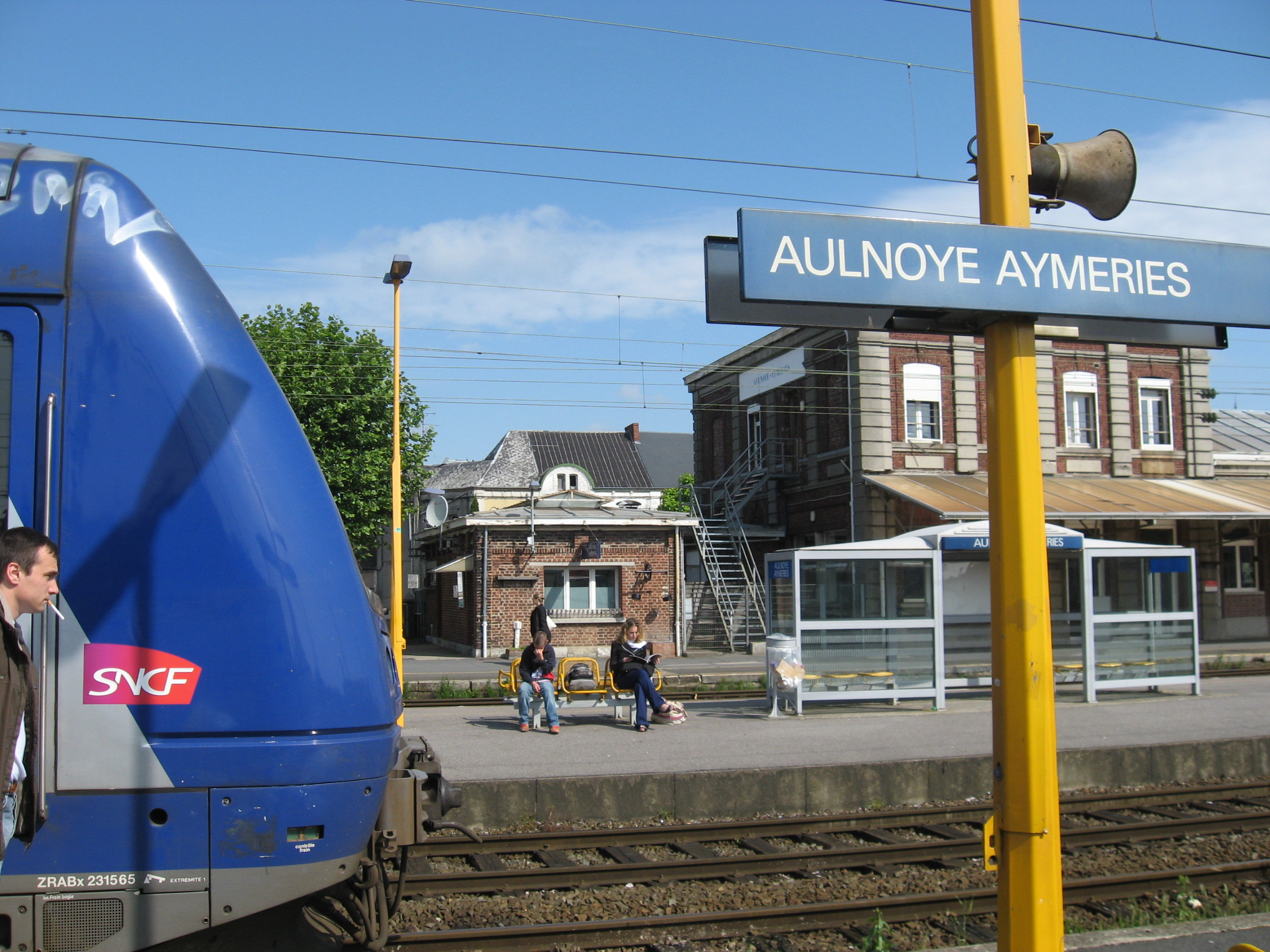
TER train at Aulnoye-Aymeries station

Aulnoye-Aymeries station (French: Gare de Aulnoye-Aymeries) is a railway station serving the town Aulnoye-Aymeries, Nord department in the Hauts-de-France region of France. It is situated on the Creil–Jeumont railway and the Fives–Hirson railway.

== Services ==
The station is served by regional trains to Charleville-Mézières, Valenciennes, Saint-Quentin, Maubeuge, Mons and Lille.
