= Aulnoye-Aymeries =

- Commune
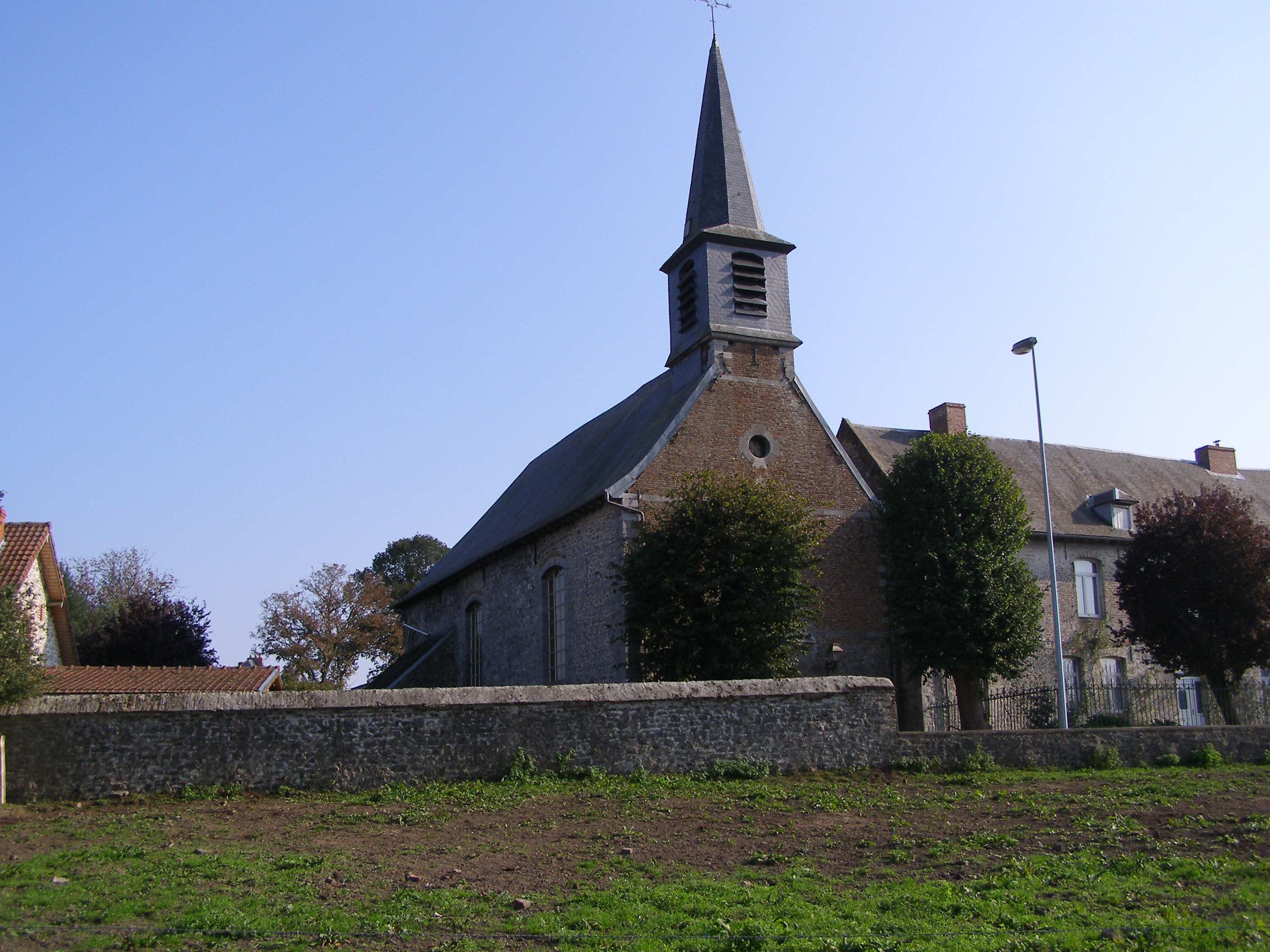
- The church in Aymeries

- Coat of arms
- Location of Aulnoye-Aymeries
- Location within France Location within Hauts-de-France
- Coordinates: 50°12′18″N 3°50′11″E
- Country: France
- Region: Hauts-de-France
- Department: Nord
- Arrondissement: Avesnes-sur-Helpe
- Canton: Aulnoye-Aymeries
- Intercommunality: CA Maubeuge Val de Sambre

Government
  - Mayor (2020–2026): Bernard Baudoux
- Area^{1}: 8.66 km^{2} (3.34 sq mi)
- Elevation: 148 m (486 ft)
- Highest elevation: 151 m (495 ft)
- Lowest elevation: 125 m (410 ft)
- Population (2023): 8,612
  - Density: 994/km^{2} (2,580/sq mi)
- Time zone: UTC+01:00 (CET)
  - Summer (DST): UTC+02:00 (CEST)
- INSEE/Postal code: 59033 /59620
- ^{1} French Land Register data, which excludes lakes, ponds, glaciers > 1 km^{2} (0.386 sq mi or 247 acres) and river estuaries.

Aulnoye-Aymeries (French pronunciation: [o(l)nwaɛm(ə)ʁi]; Picard: Auno-Aymeries) is a commune in the Nord department in northern France. It was established in 1953 by the merger of the former communes Aulnoye and Aymeries.

Before the opening of the high-speed railway line between Brussels and Paris, the railway station of Aulnoye-Aymeries was a major junction, where the lines Paris–Brussels and Calais–Lille–Thionville connected.

== Population ==
The population data given in the table and graph below for 1946 and earlier refer to the former commune of Aulnoye.

Historical population

Year	Pop.	±% p.a.
1793	111	—
1800	104	−0.93%
1806	146	+5.82%
1821	134	−0.57%
1831	165	+2.10%
1836	172	+0.83%
1841	200	+3.06%
1846	273	+6.42%
1851	322	+3.36%
1856	338	+0.97%
1861	409	+3.89%
1866	431	+1.05%
1872	644	+6.92%
1876	818	+6.16%
1881	1,085	+5.81%
1886	1,402	+5.26%
1891	1,386	−0.23%
1896	1,457	+1.00%
1901	1,586	+1.71%

Year	Pop.	±% p.a.
1906	1,686	+1.23%
1911	1,956	+3.02%
1921	3,169	+4.94%
1926	4,399	+6.78%
1931	4,924	+2.28%
1936	5,442	+2.02%
1946	4,724	−1.40%
1954	7,286	+5.57%
1962	9,405	+3.24%
1968	9,750	+0.60%
1975	9,917	+0.24%
1982	10,086	+0.24%
1990	9,882	−0.26%
1999	9,203	−0.79%
2007	8,814	−0.54%
2012	8,754	−0.14%
2017	8,811	+0.13%
2023	8,612	−0.38%

Source: EHESS and INSEE (1968-2023)

== Twin towns ==
Aulnoye-Aymeries is twinned with:

- Quedlinburg, Germany, since 1961

== See also ==
- Communes of the Nord department
