= Mennessis station =

French railway station

Mennessis
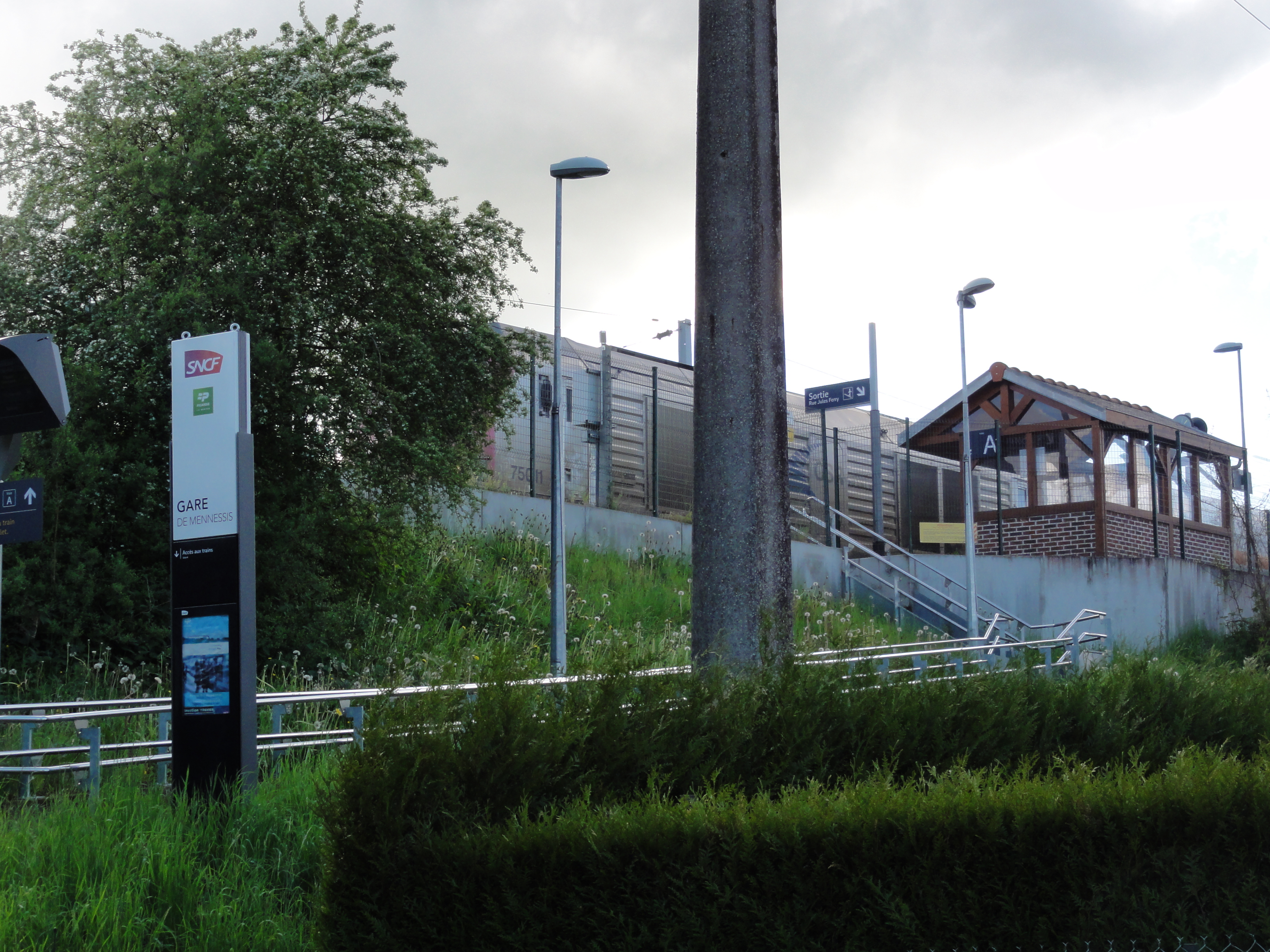
- Mennessis station

General information
- Location: Rue de la Gare, 02700 Mennessis
- Coordinates: 49°41′32″N 3°16′14″E
- Owner: RFF/SNCF
- Lines: Amiens–Laon railway, Creil–Jeumont railway

Other information
- Station code: 87296434

Services
Preceding station	TER Hauts-de-France	Following station
Montescourt towards Saint-Quentin	Proxi P14	Tergnier towards Compiègne
Flavy-le-Martel towards Amiens	Proxi P20	Tergnier towards Laon
Location

Mennessis is a railway station located in the commune of Mennessis in the Aisne department, northern France. The station is situated on the railway lines from Amiens to Laon, and from Paris to Saint-Quentin. The station is served by regional TER Hauts-de-France trains to Saint-Quentin, Compiègne, Laon and Amiens.

== History ==
The direct rail connection from Amiens to Saint-Quentin between the stations of Flavy-le-Martel and Montescourt (bypassing Mennessis) has been reopened in order to avoid switching at the busy station of Tergnier.

== See also ==
- List of SNCF stations in Hauts-de-France
