= Réseau Albert =

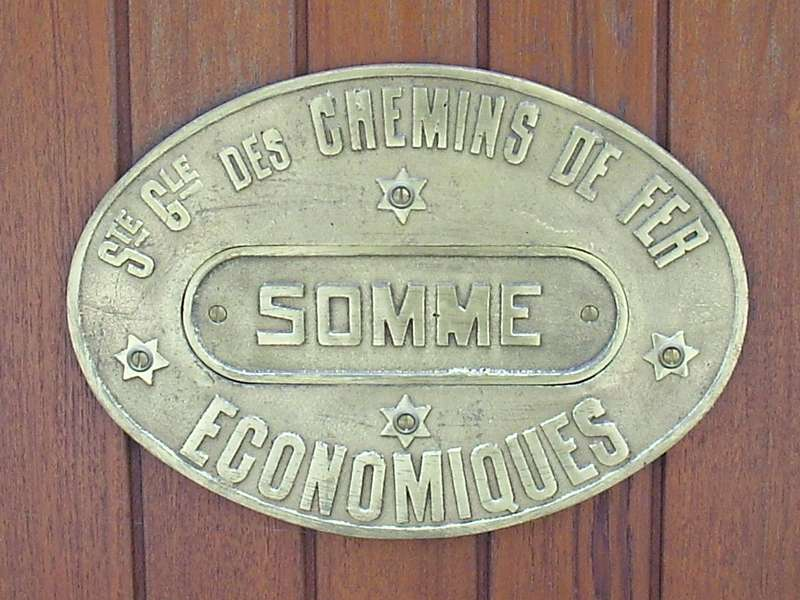
- Réseau Albert

Overview
- Headquarters: Albert
- Locale: Somme and Oise, France
- Dates of operation: 1888–1949

Technical
- Track gauge: Metre gauge (1,000 mm (3 ft 3 3/8 in))

Other
Legend

The Réseau Albert (French pronunciation: [ʁezo albɛʁ]) was a set of railway lines in France from 1889–1955, part of the Chemins de fer départementaux de la Somme. There were four lines in the Réseau Albert system:- Albert - Doullens, Albert - Ham, Fricourt - Montdidier and Offoy - Ercheu. All lines were built to 1,000 mm (3 ft 3 3/8 in), metre gauge. The entire system extended to 190 kilometres (120 mi).

== Background ==
In France, the building of railways was controlled by the Government. This avoided the duplication of routes that was seen in the United Kingdom and meant that the large cities and towns were connected. The citizens of the smaller towns and villages also wanted railways to be built to connect them to the network. The departments were given authority to oversee the construction of these minor lines, some of which were built to standard gauge and others were built to metre gauge or less. The Réseau Albert system came under the control of the Somme Department.

== Albert - Doullens line ==
The 44-kilometre (27.34 mi) long line between Albert and Doullens opened in three stages. Doullens - Beauval on 15 November 1888, Beauval - Beauquesne on 14 February 1889 and Beauquesne - Albert on 3 August 1891. The line crossed the high ground between the Ancre and Authie rivers. Its summit, at 155 metres (509 ft) was between Acheux and Mailly-Maillet. The final section of line into Doullens was dual gauge, with the metre gauge rails laid inside the standard gauge rails of the Chemin de Fer du Nord's Amiens - Frévent à Gézaincourt line. An example of this method can be found on the Chemin de Fer de la Baie de Somme line.

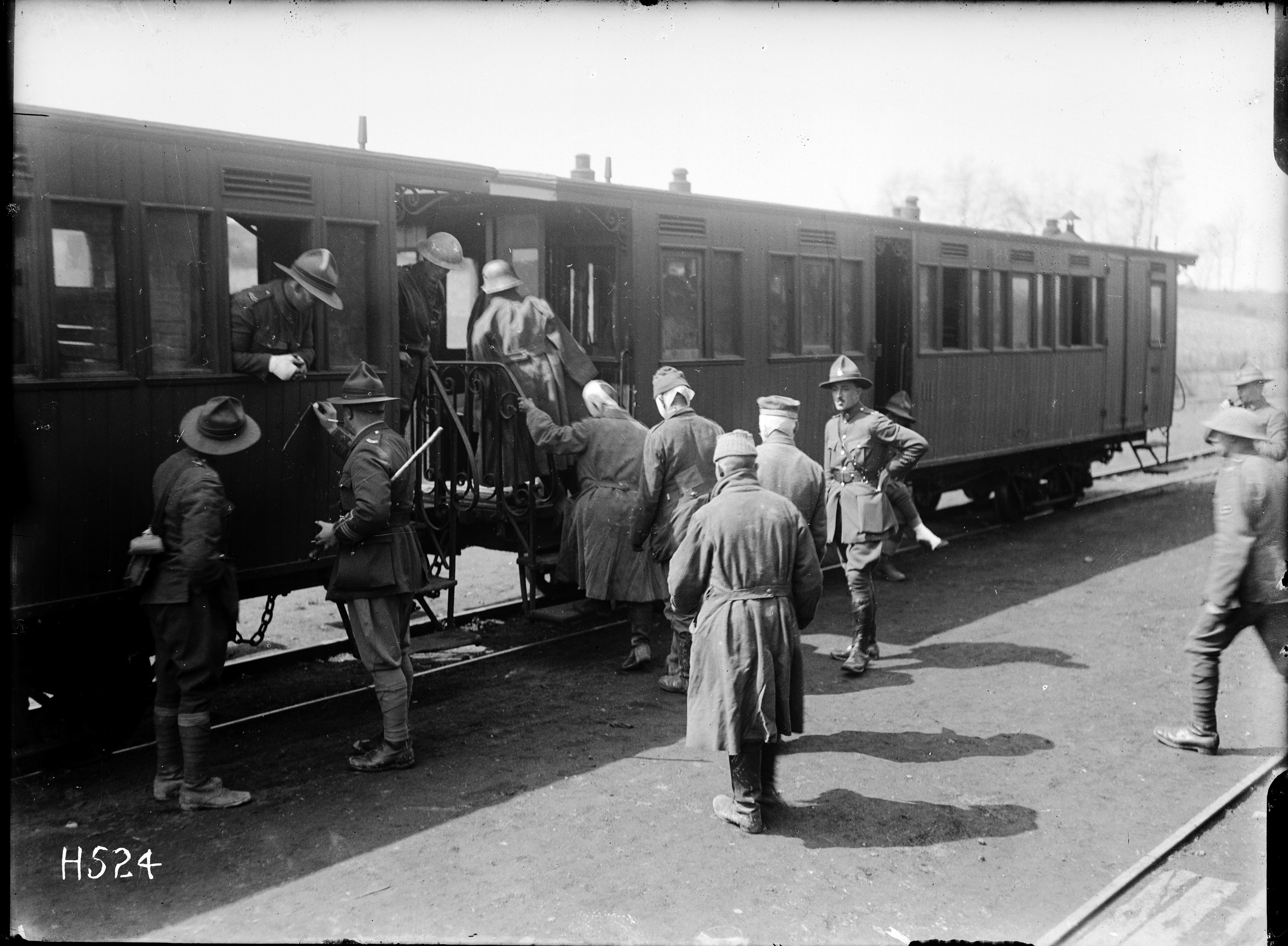
Wounded German soldiers boarding a train at Louvencourt on 22 April 1918.

During World War I, the line was in Allied hands. Before the Battle of the Somme in 1916, the line was truncated at Gézaincourt when the Standard gauge line of the Chemins de Fer du Nord was doubled. By October 1916, the line between Achuex-en-Amiénsois and Albert was disused. The section between Gézaincourt and Acheux-en-Amiénsois was used by the military, particularly for removing casualties from Acheux-en-Amiénsois to a casualty clearing station at Beauval. In preparation for the Battle of the Somme in 1916, branches were built from Martinsart to Aveluy, Thiepville Woods and Authuille to enable supplies of munitions to be brought up. Following the Battle of the Somme, the section of line between Acheux-en-Arménsois and Aveluy was converted to 600 mm (1 ft 11 5/8 in) gauge. The first train on this section ran on 12 February 1917. In April 1917, it was decided that the line between Albert and Doullens should be restored to Metre gauge. The conversion work was slow due to a number of factors, including the lack of suitable materials, the refusal of the French to supply material and a difference in priorities between the British and the French. The British made the recovery of materials for use on standard gauge lines their priority, whilst the French wanted the completion and opening of the line to be the first priority. By July 1917, the Société Générale des Chemins de Fer Economiques (SE), of which the Réseau Albert formed part, was running two trains per day between Acheux-en-Arménsois and Gézaincourt. These took 20 to 30 minutes longer than they had pre-war. During the German spring offensive in 1918, the SE service ceased on 21 March. The Acheux-en-Arménsois to Gézaincourt line was the only part of the Réseau Albert to remaine in Allied hands. The line was subsequently prepared for demolition lest it should fall into enemy hands.

The line between Albert and Gézaincourt had been restored to service by 1922. It was subsequently extended to Doullens, probably when the standard gauge line was singled post-war. By 1938, following the introduction of railcars, a certain amount of rationalisation took place on all lines. Some stations and halts were downgrade to arrêts. All freight facilities were withdrawn from arrêts and those trains that did call we by request only. The line closed to passengers on 1 July 1949 and also to freight north of Acheux at the same time. The section from Albert to Acheux closed to freight on 31 December 1949.

=== Stations ===
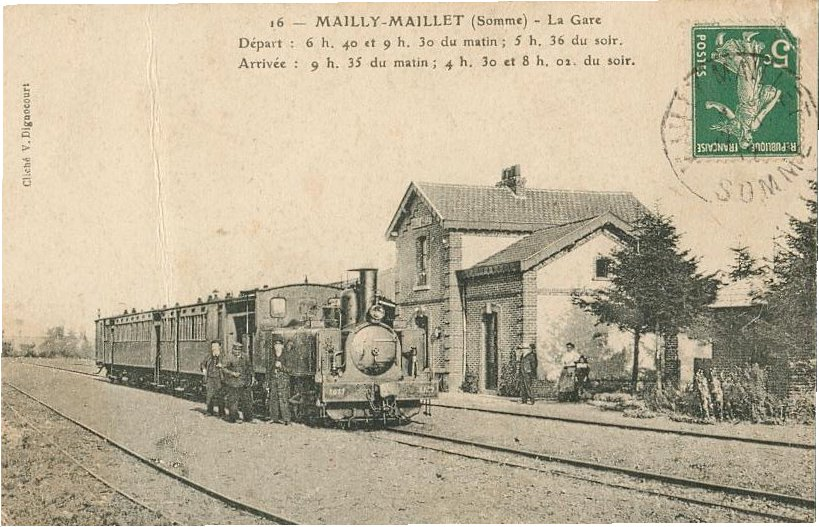
Mailly-Maillet station.

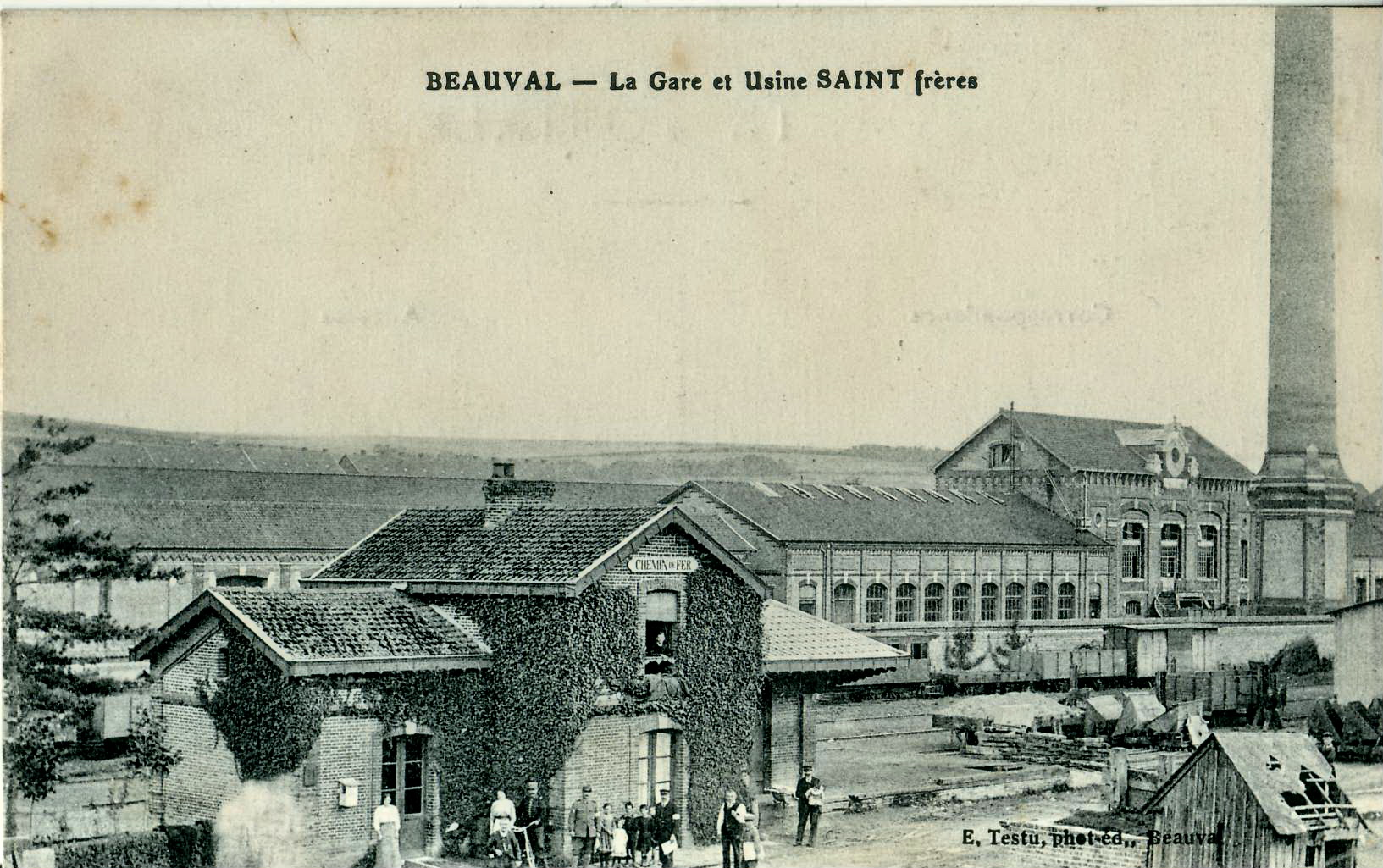
Beauval station and textile factory

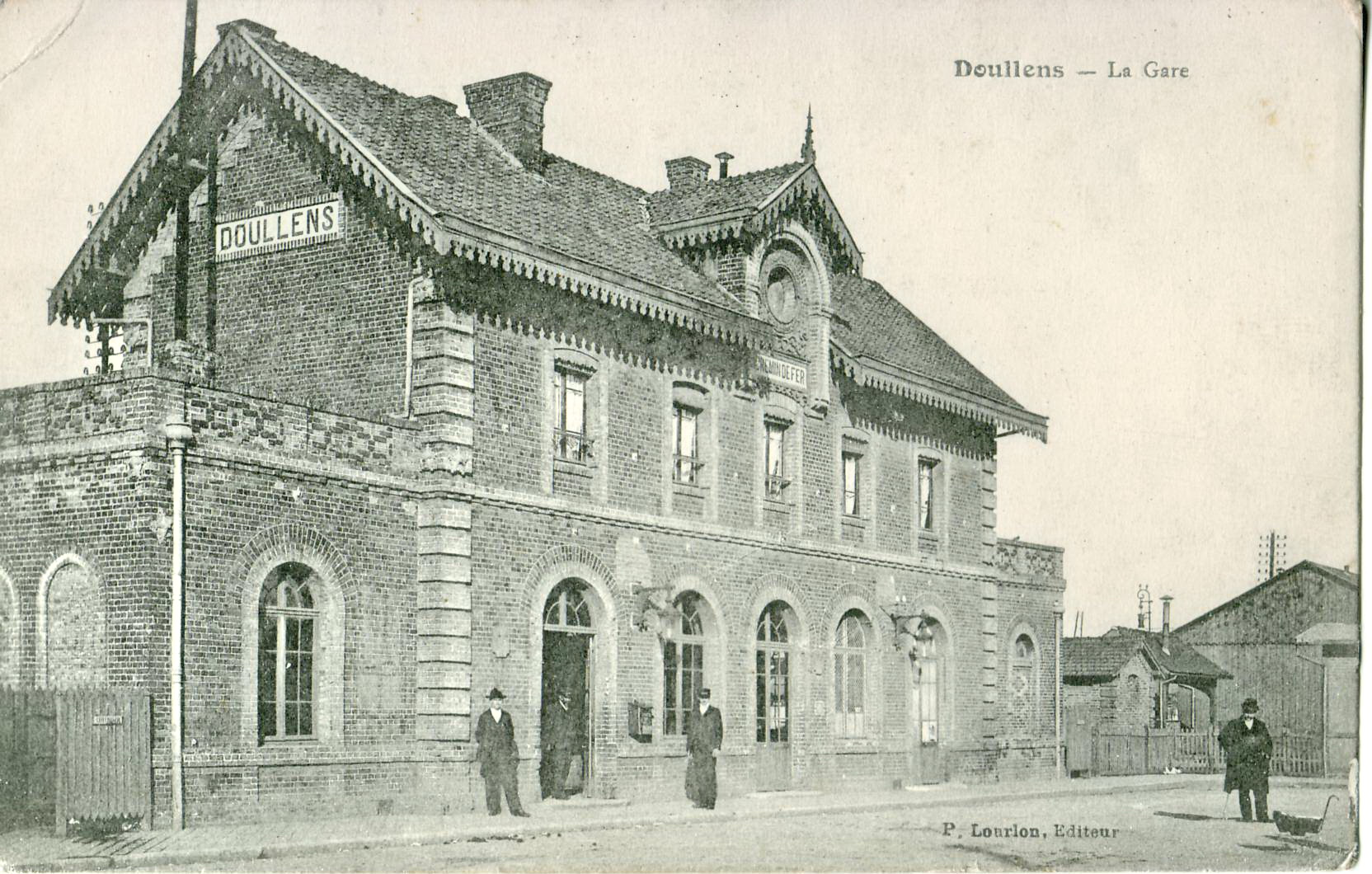
Doullens station

A textile factory at Beauval was a source of freight for the railway.

- Albert - 0 kilometres (0 mi) datum point. Elevation 68 metres (223 ft). Station shared with Standard gauge lines from Amiens to Arras.
- Aveluy - 2 kilometres (1.24 mi) from Albert. An arrêt. Elevation 84 metres (276 ft).
- Martinsart - 4 kilometres (2.49 mi) from Albert. An arrêt. Elevation 86 metres (282 ft).
- Mesnil-Martinsart - 6 kilometres (3.73 mi) from Albert. A type 2 station. Elevation 108 metres (354 ft).
- Auchonvillers - 10 kilometres (6.21 mi) from Albert. An arrêt. Elevation 139 metres (456 ft).
- Mailly-Mallet - 11 kilometres (6.84 mi) from Albert. A type 2 station. Elevation 146 metres (479 ft).
- Bertroncourt - 14 kilometres (8.70 mi) from Albert. A halt. Elevation 149 metres (489 ft).
- Acheux-Varennes - 18 kilometres (11.18 mi) from Albert. A type 1 station. Elevation 133 metres (436 ft).
- Louvencourt - 23 kilometres (14.29 mi) from Albert. A type 2 station. Elevation 106 metres (348 ft).
- Vauchelles - 25 kilometres (15.53 mi) from Albert. A halt. Elevation 102 metres (335 ft).
- Raincheval-Arquèves - 29 kilometres (18.02 mi) from Albert. A type 2 station. Elevation 108 metres (354 ft).
- Beauquesne - 31 kilometres (19.26 mi) from Albert. A type 2 station. Elevation 143 metres (469 ft).
- Beauval - 36 kilometres (22.37 mi) from Albert. An type 2 station. Elevation 86 metres (282 ft). A tarpaulin factory was served. Phosphates were a source of traffic, brought in on a 60-centimetre (2 ft 0 in) gauge line for transhipment.
- Gezaincourt - 40 kilometres (24.85 mi) from Albert. A halt. Line joins standard gauge Amiens-Frévent line here. Elevation 79 metres (259 ft).
- Doullens - 44 kilometres (27.34 mi) from Albert. Shared with Standard gauge station. Elevation 64 metres (210 ft). A factory north east of the line to Frévent was served.

== Albert - Ham line ==
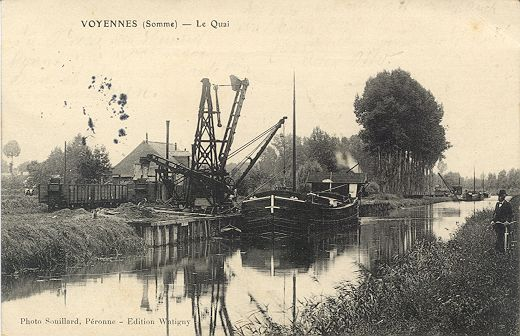
Voyennes

The 78-kilometre (48 mi) long line between Albert and Péronne opened on 1 April 1889. The line between Péronne and Ham opened on 24 October 1889. Its summit, at 144 metres (472 ft) was near Montauban.

During the early part of World War I, the front line cut the line near Fricourt. The British did not use the line before the Battle of the Somme and it is believed the Germans did not use it either. The Allies had brought the line to Fricourt and beyond into use by October 1916. The British repaired the line from Albert south to Fricourt, and the French repaired the line north from Bray-sur-Somme, this section reopening on 14 July 1916. The line from Fricourt to Montauban and Trones Wood (between Monauban and Guillemont) was subsequently reopened. This section of line, from Albert to Trones Wood, was operated by the British. During 1917, the SE ran a single train each day between Bray-sur-Somme and Montdidier. At some point, the line between Maurepas and Péronne-Flamicourt was converted to Standard gauge by the British. A 600 mm (1 ft 11 5/8 in) gauge line was laide alongside the standard gauge line, extending to Combles. In early 1918, the line between Péronne and Mons-en-Chausée, and also between Voyennes and Ham, was converted to 600 mm (1 ft 11 5/8 in) gauge. It is not known whether or not the SE ran trains at this time. The line was captured by the Germans during the Spring Offensive. A number of bridges were destroyed. The line was demolished in October 1918.

The line had been repaired and reopened to traffic by 31 December 1922. In November 1938, the line between Offoy and Ercheu was closed to passengers. Services were restored during World War II. The entire line closed on 31 December 1949.

=== Stations ===
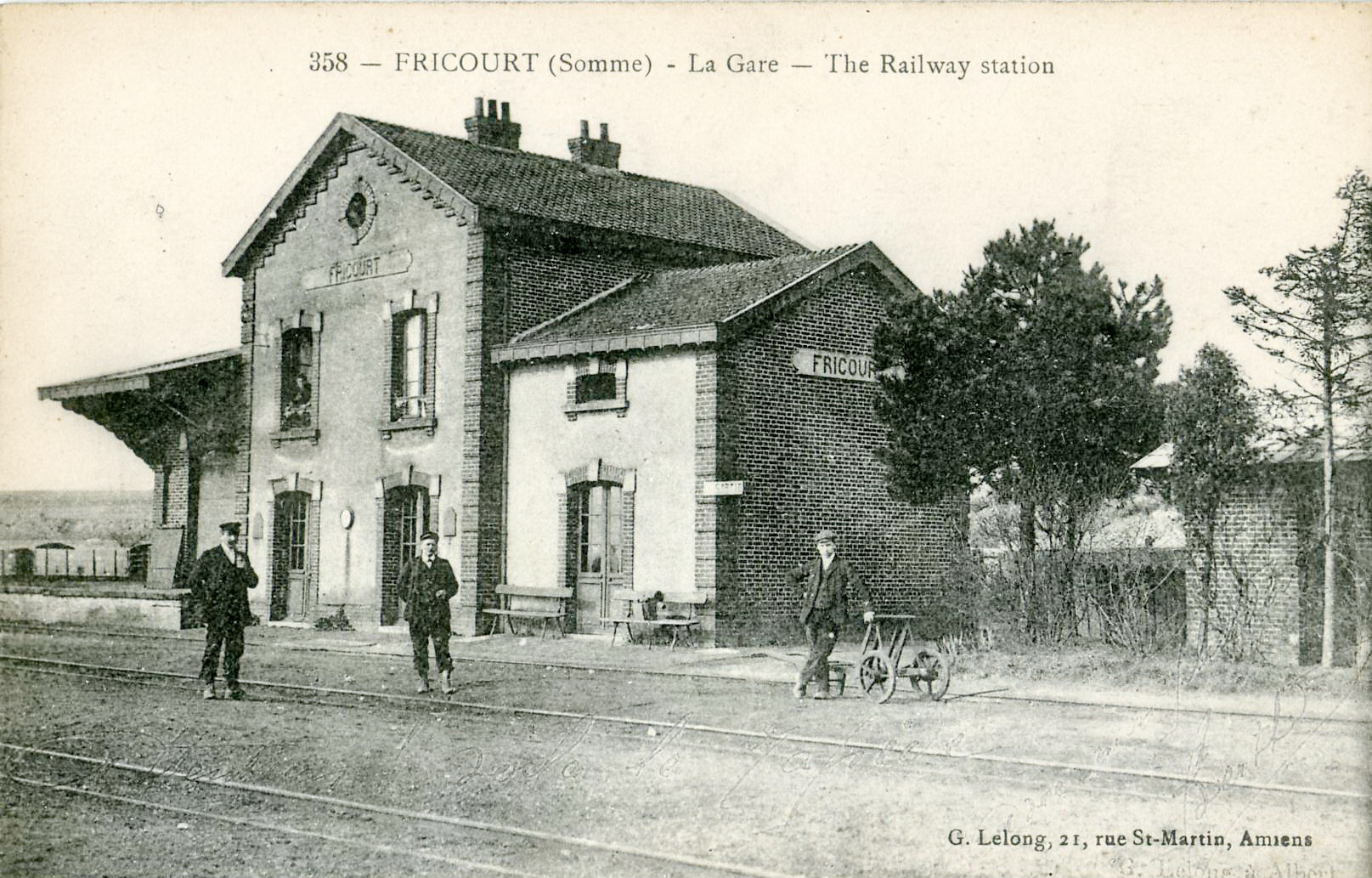
Fricourt station.

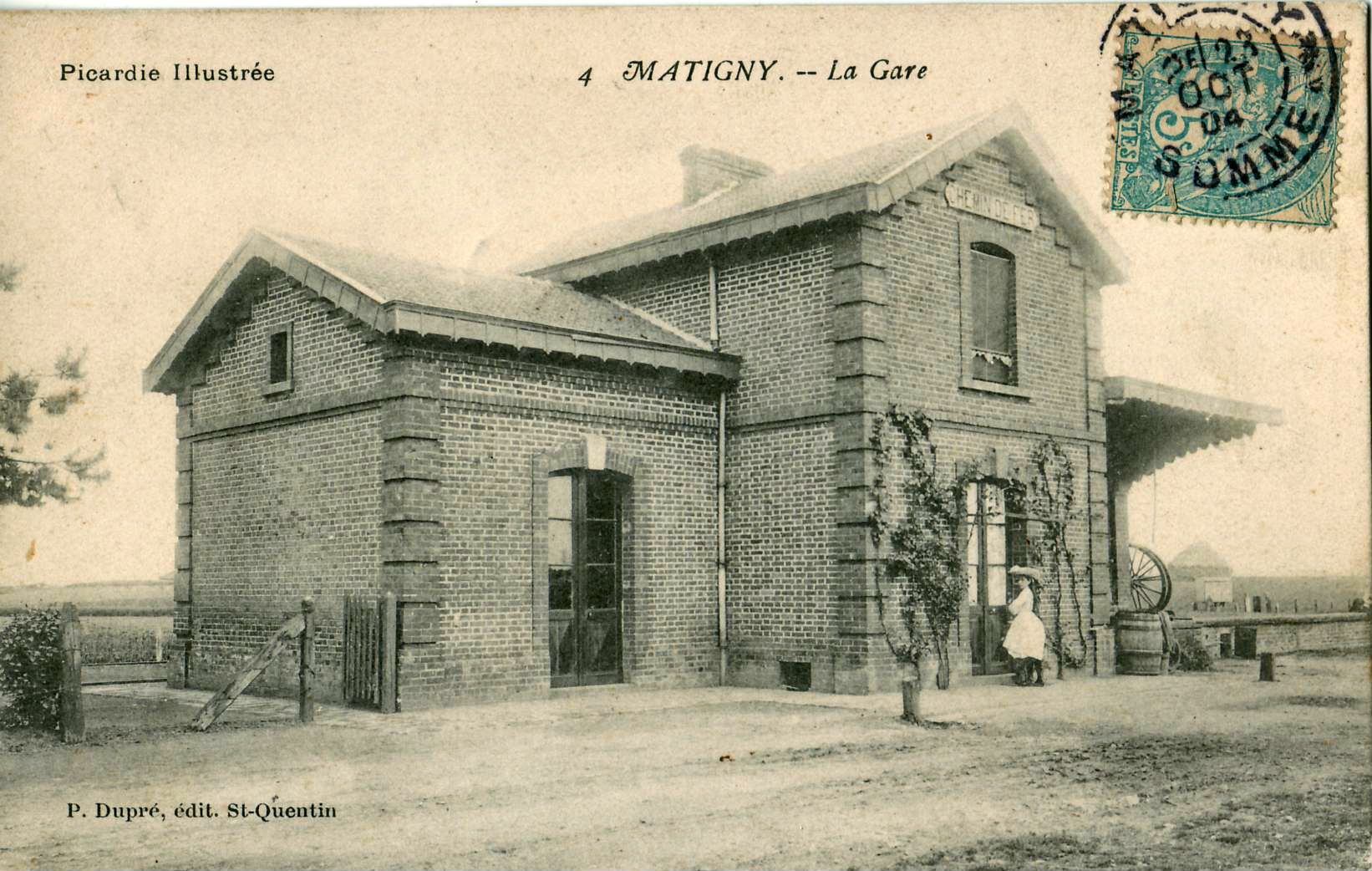
Matigny station.

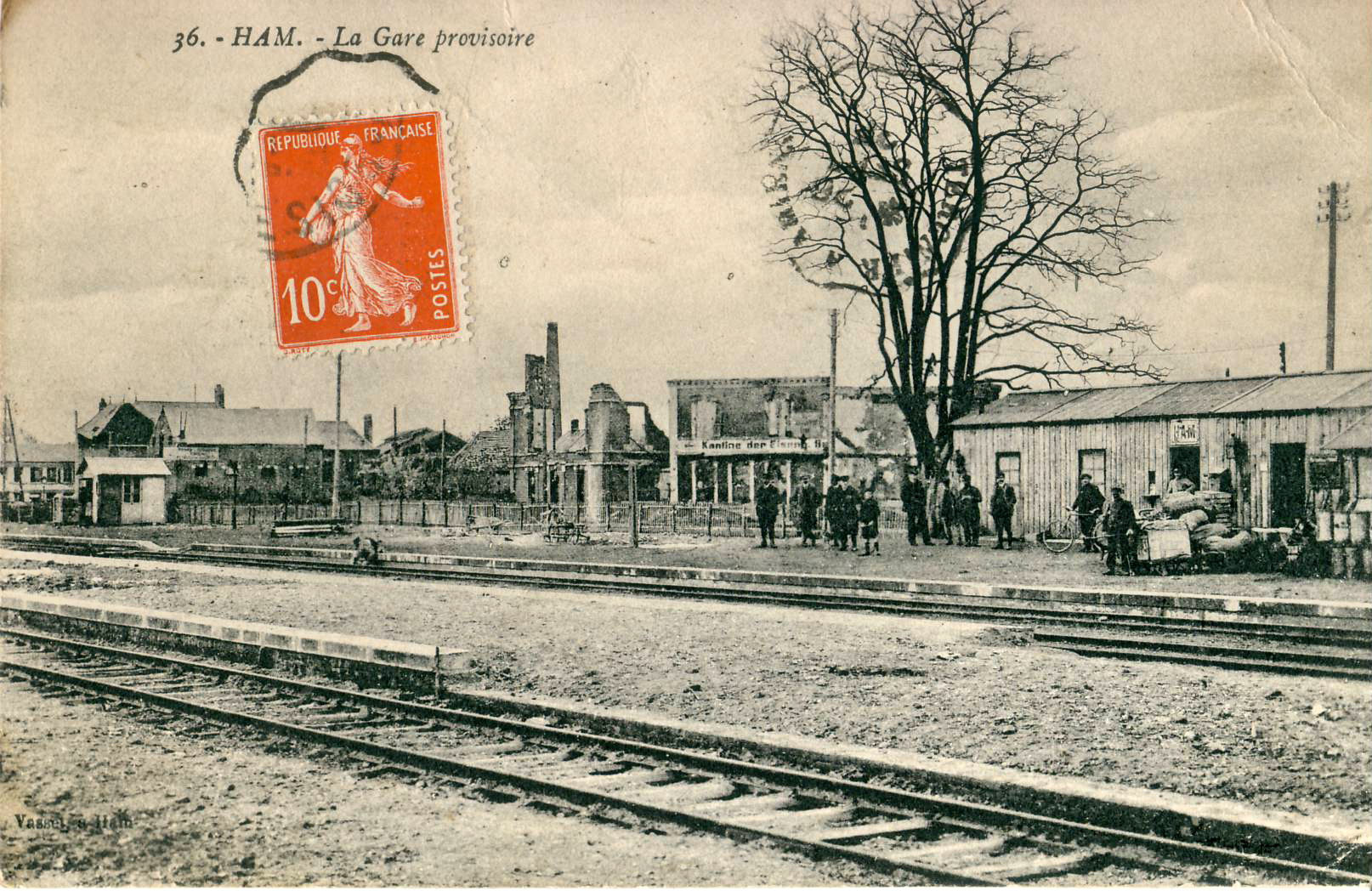
Ham station.

- Albert – 0 kilometres (0 mi) datum point. Elevation 68 metres (223 ft). Station shared with Standard gauge lines from Amiens to Arras.
- Albert (halt) – 3 kilometres (1.86 mi) from Albert. A halt.
- Bécordel-Bécourt – 6 kilometres (3.73 mi) from Albert. An arrêt (halt).
- Fricourt – 8 kilometres (4.97 mi) from Albert. Elevation 64 metres (210 ft). A type 1 station, junction with line to Montdidier.
- Mametz – 10 kilometres (6.21 mi) from Albert. Elevation 75 metres (246 ft). A halt.
- Carnoy – 12 kilometres (7.46 mi) from Albert. An arrêt.
- Montauban – 16 kilometres (9.94 mi) from Albert. Elevation 144 metres (472 ft). A type 2 station.
- Guillemont-Longueval - 18 kilometres (11.18 mi) from Albert. Elevation 139 metres (456 ft). A type 2 station. There was a branch line which ran 0.60 kilometres (660 yd) to a sucrerie at Guillemont and then a further 1 kilometre (0.62 mi) to another at Longueval.
- Combles – 25 kilometres (15.53 mi) from Albert. Elevation 101 metres (331 ft). A type 1 station.
- Maurepas – 28 kilometres (17.40 mi) from Albert. Elevation 68 metres (223 ft). A halt.
- Hem-Monacu – 32 kilometres (19.88 mi) from Albert. Elevation 51 metres (167 ft). A station.
- Feullières – 33 kilometres (20.51 mi) from Albert. Elevation 68 metres (223 ft). An arrêt.
- Cléry-sur-Somme – 36 kilometres (22.37 mi) from Albert. Elevation 47 metres (154 ft). A halt. A branch left the main line 700 metres (770 yd) west of Cléry. It ran for about 2 kilometres (1.24 mi) to a factory in Bouchavesnes.
- Le Quinconce – 41 kilometres (25.48 mi) from Albert. An arrêt. A branch ran for 700 metres (770 yd) to a sucrerie at Saint-Denis.
- Porte de Bretagne – 41 kilometres (25.48 mi) from Albert. A halt. A sucrerie was served.
- Péronne-Flamicourt – 44 kilometres (27.34 mi) from Albert. Elevation 50 metres (160 ft). Shared station on standard gauge Amiens-Cambrai line.
- Mesnil-Bruntel – 49 kilometres (30.45 mi) from Albert. Elevation 52 metres (171 ft). A halt.
- Mons-en-Chaussée – 52 kilometres (32.31 mi) from Albert. Elevation 84 metres (276 ft). A type 2 station. Between Mons and Athies, two branch lines, of 500 metres (550 yd) and 700 metres (770 yd) served quarries.
- Athies – 56 kilometres (34.80 mi) from Albert. Elevation 55 metres (180 ft). A type 2 station. A branch line was linked by a triangular junction 400 metres (440 yd) south west of Athies. It ran for 5 kilometres (3.11 mi) to a factory in Saint-Christ.
- Devise – 57 kilometres (35.42 mi) from Albert. Elevation 54 metres (177 ft). A halt.
- Monchy-Lagache – 60 kilometres (37.28 mi) from Albert. Elevation 67 metres (220 ft). A type 2 station. A branch line left the main line 150 metres (160 yd) south of Monchy. It ran for 300 metres (330 yd) to a factory.
- Fletz-Douvieux – 62 kilometres (38.53 mi) from Albert. Elevation 87 metres (285 ft). An arrêt.
- Quivières – 63 kilometres (39.15 mi) from Albert. Elevation 85 metres (279 ft). A halt.
- Croix-Moligneaux – 65 kilometres (40.39 mi) from Albert. Elevation 51 metres (167 ft). An arrêt. A branch line left the main line 700 metres (770 yd) south of Croix. It ran for 900 metres (980 yd) to a sucrerie.
- Matigny – 67 kilometres (41.63 mi) from Albert. Elevation 74 metres (243 ft). A type 2 station.
- Offoy – 72 kilometres (44.74 mi) from Albert. Elevation 63 metres (207 ft). A type 1 station, junction with metre gauge line to Ercheu.
- Canisy – 74 kilometres (45.98 mi) from Albert. Elevation 67 metres (220 ft). An arrêt (halt).
- Ham – 78 kilometres (48.47 mi) from Albert. Elevation 64 metres (210 ft). Shared with station on standard gauge Amiens-Tergnier line. Junction with metre gauge line to Noyon. A sucrerie at Eppeville, near Ham, was served by the addition of a metre gauge siding to the existing standard gauge one.

== Fricourt - Montdidier line ==
The 53-kilometre (33 mi) long line between Rosières and Montdidier opened on 28 June 1889, and the line between Rosières and Fricourt opened on 26 October 1889. A summit, at 103 metres (338 ft) was near Bray-sur-Somme. South of Bray, there were summits of 103 metres (338 ft) near Hangestand 102 metres (335 ft) near Fignières .

During the early part of World War I, prior to the Battle of the Somme, the line between Montdidier and Rosières-en-Santerre was used by the French Army. A third rail was added to make this section dual gauge with a 600 mm (1 ft 11 5/8 in) gauge light railway. The line was disused north of Rosières-en-Santerre. A branch was built to serve the main headquarters of the French light railways in the Somme sector at Etelfray. The line was captured by the Germans during the Spring Offensive. A number of bridges were destroyed.

The line between Montdidier and Rosières-en-Santerre had been reopened by September 1921, with the line to Fricourt being reopened by 31 December. The entire line was closed to passengers, and to freight south of Froissy on 15 April 1948. The section to Froissy closed to freight on 31 December 1948.

=== Stations ===
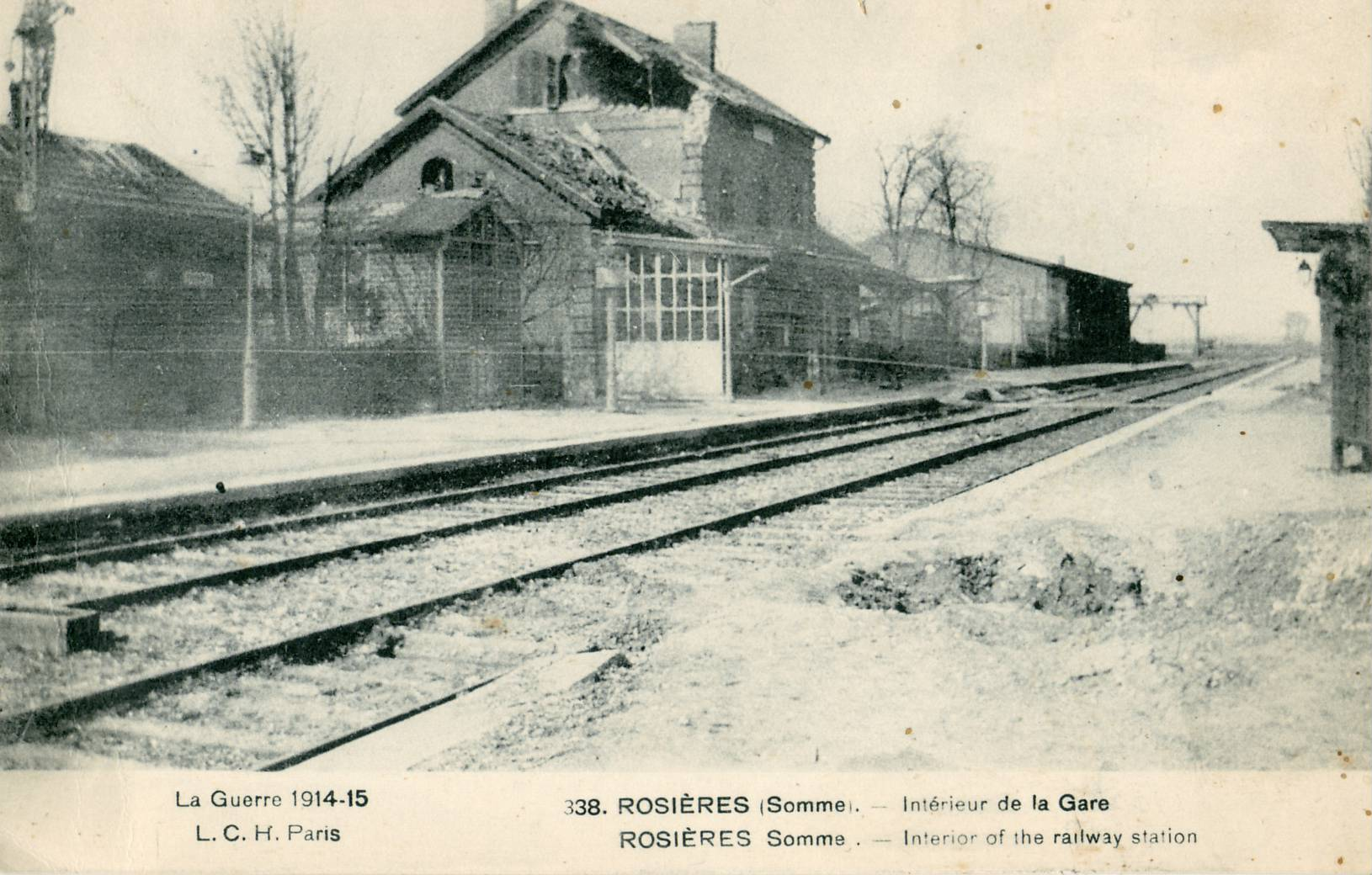
Rosières-en-Santerre station, showing damage sustained during WWI.

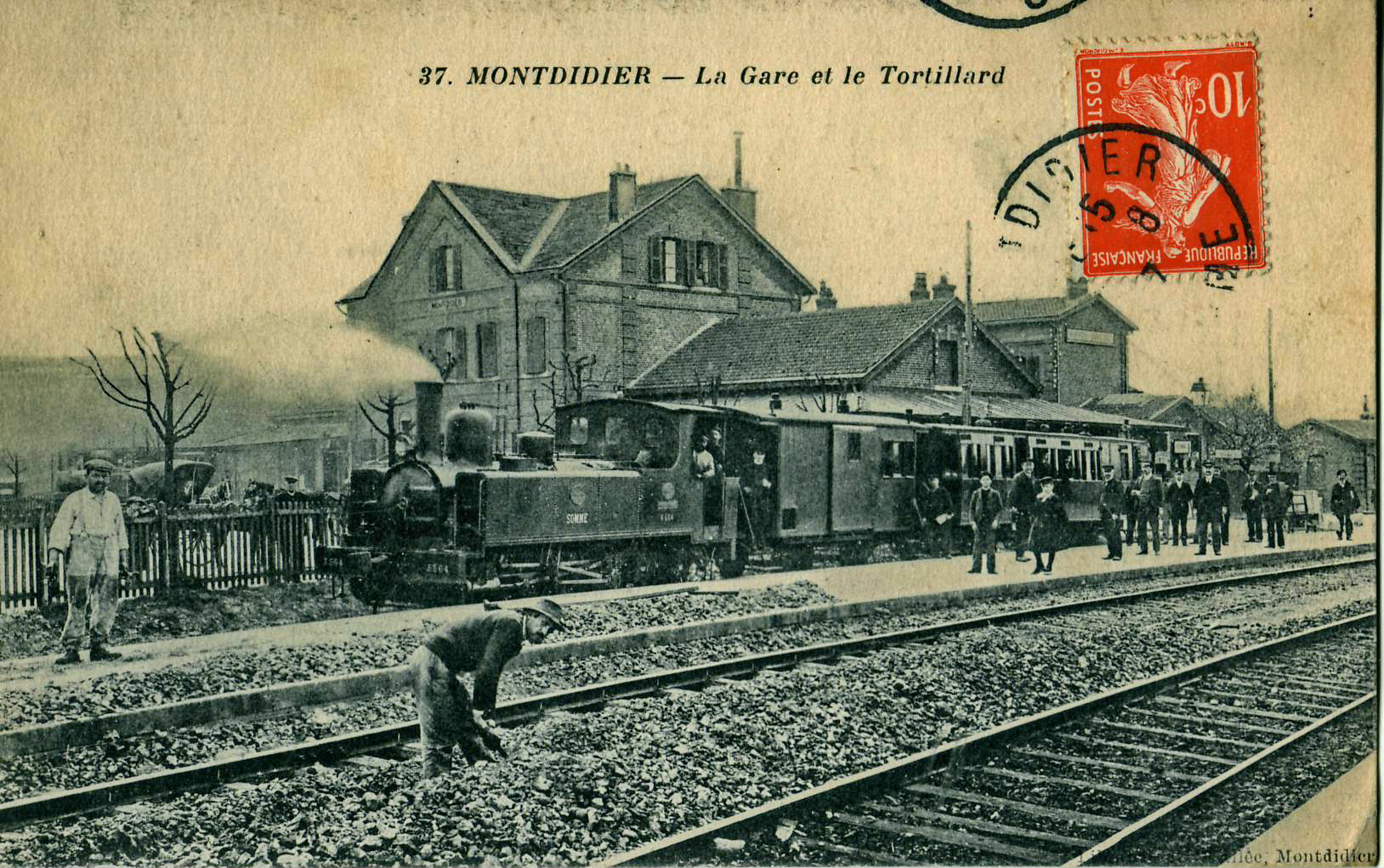
Montdidier station.

- Fricourt - 8 kilometres (4.97 mi) from Albert. Elevation 64 metres (210 ft). A type 1 station, junction with line to Ham.
- Bray-sur-Somme- 16 kilometres (9.94 mi) from Albert. Elevation 41 metres (135 ft). A type 1 station.
- Froissy - 18 kilometres (11.18 mi) from Albert. Elevation 42 metres (138 ft). A halt. Transfer facility with the 600 mm (1 ft 11 5/8 in) gauge Chemin de Fer Froissy-Cappy-Dompierre. A branch line served a sucrerie.
- Chuignolles - 22 kilometres (13.67 mi) from Albert. Elevation 78 metres (256 ft). A halt.
- Proyart - 24 kilometres (14.91 mi) from Albert. Elevation 84 metres (276 ft). A type 2 station.
- Framerville - 26 kilometres (16.16 mi) from Albert. Elevation 89 metres (292 ft). An arrêt.
- Habronnièrers - 28 kilometres (17.40 mi) from Albert. Elevation 89 metres (292 ft). A type 2 station.
- Rosières-en-Santerre - 32 kilometres (19.88 mi) from Albert. Elevation 90 metres (300 ft). Shared with station on Standard gauge Amiens-Tergnier line.
- Rosières-Vrély - 34 kilometres (21.13 mi) from Albert. Elevation 86 metres (282 ft). An arrêt.
- Caix-Vrély - 36 kilometres (22.37 mi) from Albert. Elevation 69 metres (226 ft). A station.
- Le Quesnel-Beaufort - 41 kilometres (25.48 mi) from Albert. Elevation 94 metres (308 ft). A station.
- Bouchoir - 42 kilometres (26.10 mi) from Albert. Elevation 98 metres (322 ft). An arrêt.
- Arvillers-Hangest - 44 kilometres (27.34 mi) from Albert. Elevation 103 metres (338 ft). A type 2 station.
- Davenescourt - 50 kilometres (31.07 mi) from Albert. Elevation 60 metres (200 ft). A type 2 station.
- Becquigny - 51 kilometres (31.69 mi) from Albert. Elevation 69 metres (226 ft). An arrêt.
- Fignières - 54 kilometres (33.55 mi) from Albert. Elevation 102 metres (335 ft). A halt.
- Montdidier halt- 58 kilometres (36.04 mi) from Albert. Elevation 76 metres (249 ft). An arrêt.
- Montdidier - 60 kilometres (37.28 mi) from Albert. Elevation 60 metres (200 ft). Shared with station on Standard gauge Amiens-Compèigne line. Junction with Metre gauge line to Rollot and Noyon. In the 1920s, a bridge was constructed to enable the line to cross the Standard gauge line, replacing the earlier crossing on the level.

== Offoy - Bussy line ==
The 20-kilometre (12 mi) long line between Offoy and Bussy opened on 14 July 1890. This line laid behind the German front line during World War I. In February 1919, it was proposed that the line between Bussy and Ercheu should be reconstructed. SE signed an agreement with the préfet in April 1919. The line probably reopened on 1 October 1920, and the section between Ercheu and Offoy in September 1921. The line between Offoy and Ercheu closed on 1 July 1949. Ercheu to Bussy closed to passengers on 1 February 1954, An occasional freight service was operated until 31 December 1955. The last few kilometres of the line were in Oise.

=== Stations ===
- Offoy - 72 kilometres (44.74 mi) from Albert and 20 kilometres (12.43 mi) from Ercheu. Elevation 63 metres (207 ft). A type 1 station, junction with line to Ham.
- Voyennes - 20 kilometres (12.43 mi) from Ercheu. Elevation 57 metres (187 ft). A halt.
- Roue-le-Petit - 15 kilometres (9.32 mi) from Ercheu. Elevation 57 metres (187 ft). A station.
- Mesnil-Saint-Nicaise - 12 kilometres (7.46 mi) from Ercheu. Elevation 77 metres (253 ft). A type 2 station. Two sucreries were served, each by a separate branch.
- Nesle - 10 kilometres (6.21 mi) from Ercheu. Elevation 19 metres (62 ft). Shared with station on Standard gauge Amiens-Tergnier line. A distillerie adjacent to Nesle station was served by means of a dual gauge siding.
- Languevoisin - 7 kilometres (4.35 mi) from Ercheu. An arrêt.
- Breuil - 5 kilometres (3.11 mi) from Ercheu. An arrêt.
- Moyencourt - 3 kilometres (1.86 mi) from Ercheu. Elevation 63 metres (207 ft). A type 2 station. A branch line left the main line 250 metres (270 yd) south of Moyencourt. It ran for 500 metres (550 yd) to a sucrerie.
- Ercheu - 0 kilometres (0.00 mi) datum point for line. Elevation 73 metres (240 ft). A type 1 station. a râperie (sugar beet shredding plant) adjacent to the station was served.
- Ognolles - 1 kilometre (0.62 mi) from Ercheu. Elevation 76 metres (249 ft). A type 2 station.
- Beaulieu - 6 kilometres (3.73 mi) from Ercheu. An arrêt.
- Beaulieu-Ecuvilly - 7 kilometres (4.35 mi) from Ercheu. Elevation 76 metres (249 ft). A type 2 station. A sucrerie was served.
- Catigny - 9 kilometres (5.59 mi) from Ercheu. Elevation 56 metres (184 ft). A type 2 station.
- Sermaize - 11 kilometres (6.84 mi) from Ercheu. Elevation 54 metres (177 ft). A halt.
- Haudival - 12 kilometres (7.46 mi) from Ercheu. Elevation 49 metres (161 ft). A halt.
- Bussy - 13 kilometres (8.08 mi) from Ercheu. Elevation 47 metres (154 ft). A type 2 station Junction with Noyon-Ham line.

== Station types ==
The stations on the Réseau Albert were classed according to their importance and the size of the location they served. A type 1 station had a main building with its ridge at right angles to the track, and a wing each side, one of which contained a goods hall. A type 2 station had a main building with its ridge at right angles to the track and smaller wings. A halt had just a main building. An arrêt had just a wood or brick shelter, if one was provided, with a rudimentary platform.

== Rolling stock ==
=== Locomotives ===
The Société Générale des Chemins de Fer Economiques had at least 43 steam locomotives. In 1914, locomotives 3.524/25, 3.529-38, 3.540, 3.564, 3.566 and 3.571/72 were allocated to the Réseau Albert. Locomotive 3.571 was lost during World War I; 3.572 was captured by the Germans in 1916. It was recovered in 1922, repaired and returned to service.

Builder	Wheel arrangement	Running numbers	Number in class
NC	0-6-2T	3.519-3.533	15
SACM	0-6-2T	3.534-3.540	7
SACM	0-6-2T	3.561-3.570	10
NC	0-6-2T	3.601-3.602	2
NC	0-6-2T	3.571-3.572	2
NC	0-6-2T	3.510, 3.512, 3.623, 3.639	4
BM	2-6-0T	3.651-3.652	2
BM	2-6-0T	3.661	1

=== Railcars ===
In 1925. two 30 horsepower (22 kW) Renault diesel railcars were put into service between Albert and Montdidier. Between 1936 and 1939, the SE introduced 85 horsepower (63 kW) De Dion-Bouton railcars on services from Albert. The NO type railcars were transferred from the Réseau de la Nièvre, which closed in 1939. By 1938, railcars were providing most of the passenger service on all lines except Offoy to Bussy.

Type	Builder		Numbers
KA	Renault	1925	A1-A2
NJ	De Dion-Bouton	1936-7	M1-M10
NJ	De Dion-Bouton	1939	M11-M12
NO	De Dion-Bouton	1939?	R1-R4

=== Carriages ===
The Réseau Albert carriages were all bogie carriages, entered by end balconies. They were built by Decauville or Desouche & David. Carriages were mostly composite carriages (first, second and third class, first and second, first and third or second and third), with some all-thirds.

=== Goods wagons ===
The Réseau Albert had over 900 goods wagons.

Type	Description	Quantity	Notes
H	Wagon à ridelle	165	Five were bogie flats. Some were adapted for the carriage of molasses, oil or phosphates.
K	Van	129	Three equipped as rescue wagons.
T	Couplable	36	Flat wagon with mobile traverse.
U	Tombereau	560	Thirty-two were bogie opens.
-	Fourgon	16	
-	Crane	4	Capacity 4 tonnes.
