= Tergnier station =

Railway station in Tergnier, France

Coordinates: 49°39′33″N 3°17′51″E

Tergnier
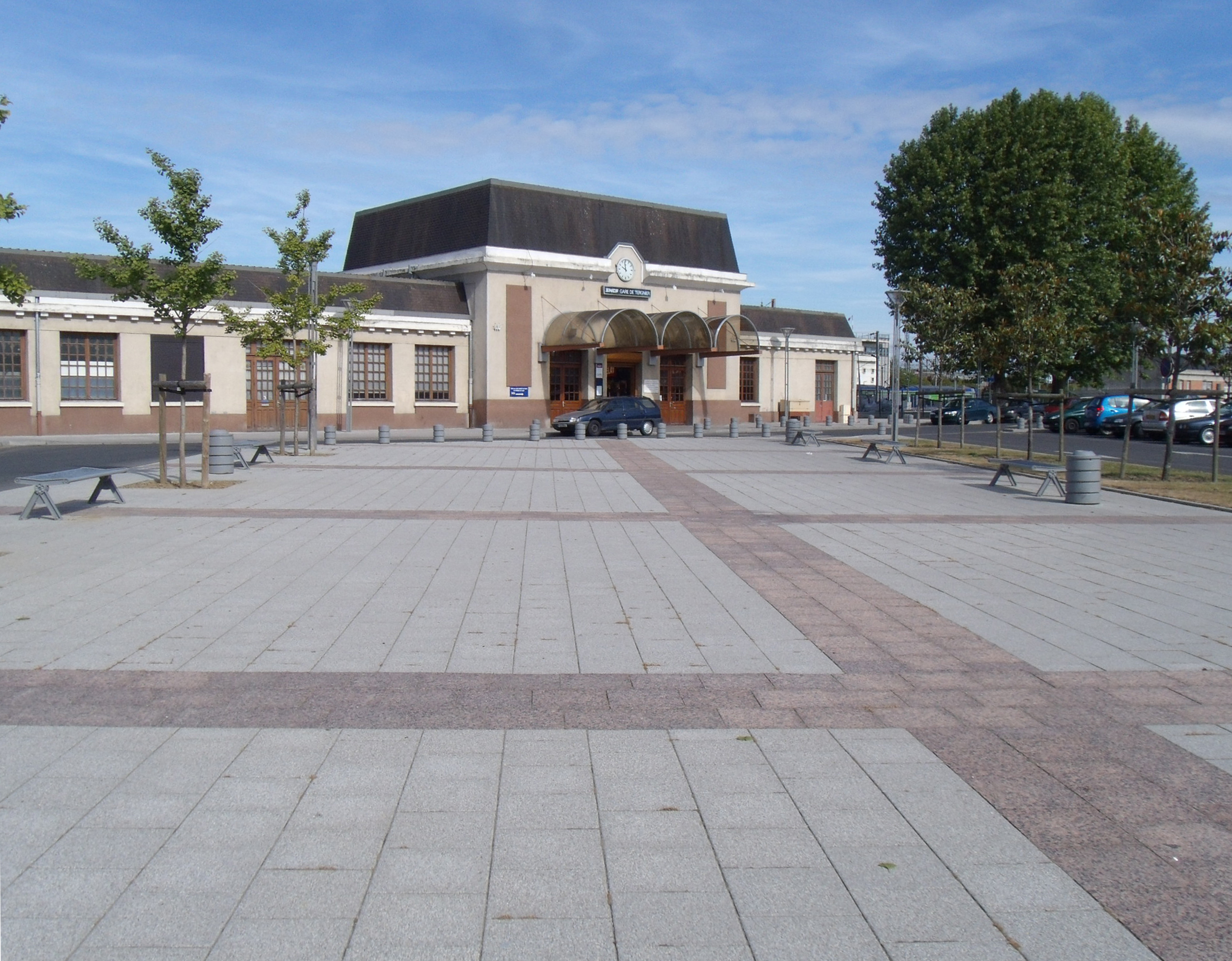

General information
- Location: Place Vaucanson; 02700 Tergnier; Aisne, France
- Owner: SNCF
- Operator: SNCF

Other information
- Station code: 87296442
Location

Tergnier station (French: Gare de Tergnier) is a railway station serving the town Tergnier, Aisne department, northern France. It is situated at kilometric point 130.878 on the Creil–Jeumont railway.

== Services ==
The station is served by regional trains to Compiègne, Amiens, Laon, Saint-Quentin and Paris.

Preceding station	TER Hauts-de-France	Following station
Saint-Quentin Terminus	Krono K14	Chauny towards Paris-Nord
Mennessis towards Saint-Quentin	Proxi P14	Viry-Noureuil towards Compiègne
Mennessis towards Amiens	Proxi P20	La Fère towards Laon
