= Flavy-le-Martel =

- Commune
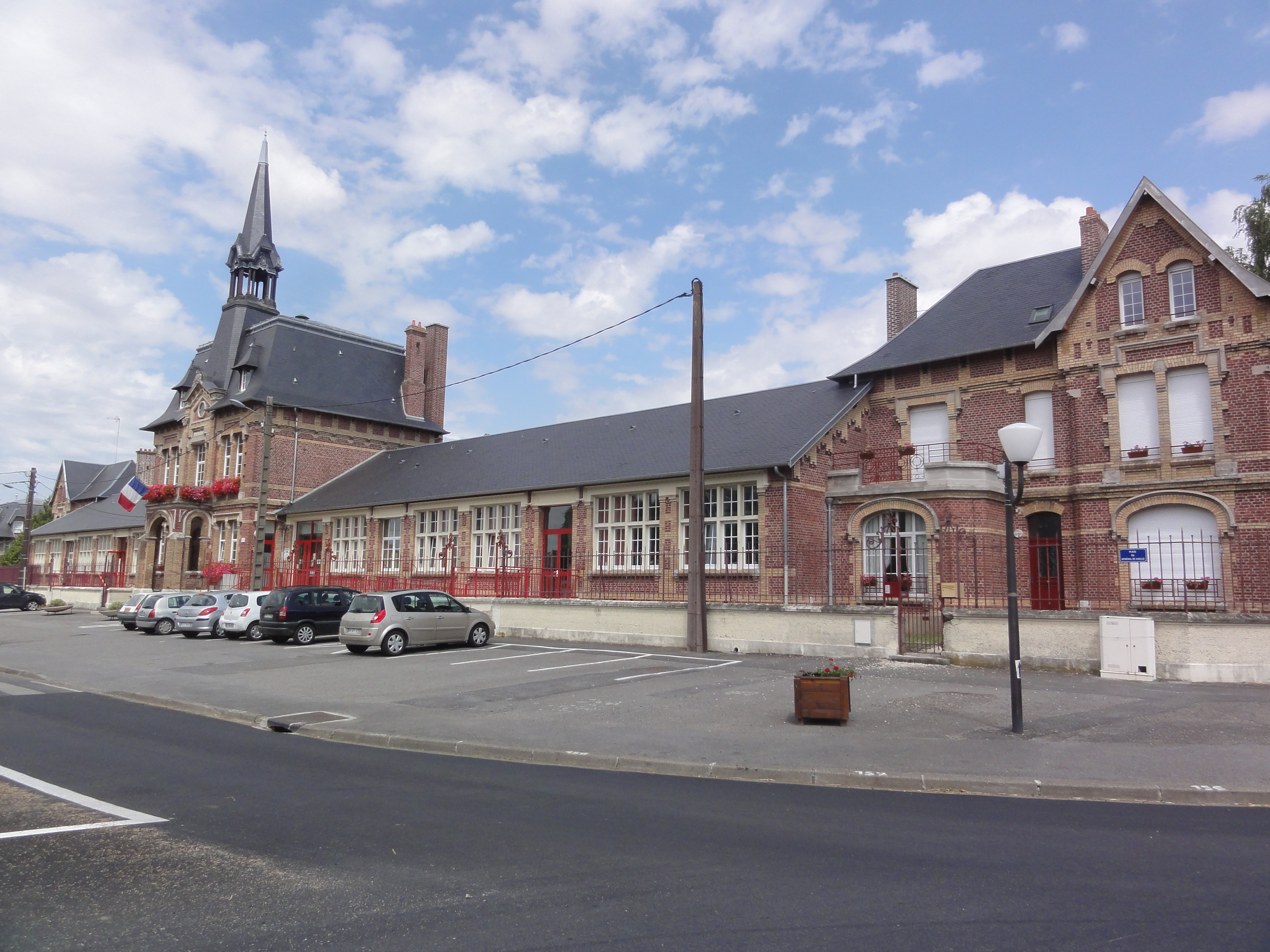
- The town hall and schools of Flavy-le-Martel

- Coat of arms
- Location of Flavy-le-Martel
- Location within France Location within Hauts-de-France
- Coordinates: 49°42′50″N 3°11′38″E
- Country: France
- Region: Hauts-de-France
- Department: Aisne
- Arrondissement: Saint-Quentin
- Canton: Ribemont
- Intercommunality: CA Saint-Quentinois

Government
  - Mayor (2026–32): Damien Van Isacker
- Area^{1}: 12.83 km^{2} (4.95 sq mi)
- Elevation: 69 m (226 ft)
- Highest elevation: 158 m (518 ft)
- Lowest elevation: 63 m (207 ft)
- Population (2023): 1,701
  - Density: 132.6/km^{2} (343.4/sq mi)
- Time zone: UTC+01:00 (CET)
  - Summer (DST): UTC+02:00 (CEST)
- INSEE/Postal code: 02315 /02520
- ^{1} French Land Register data, which excludes lakes, ponds, glaciers > 1 km^{2} (0.386 sq mi or 247 acres) and river estuaries.

Flavy-le-Martel (French pronunciation: [flavi lə maʁtɛl]) is a commune in the Aisne department in Hauts-de-France in northern France. Flavy-le-Martel station has rail connections to Saint-Quentin and Amiens. It is the sister city of Carthage, North Carolina, US.

== Population ==
Historical population
Year	Pop.	±% p.a.
1968	1,543	—
1975	1,560	+0.16%
1982	1,504	−0.52%
1990	1,563	+0.48%
1999	1,520	−0.31%
2007	1,625	+0.84%
2012	1,625	+0.00%
2017	1,687	+0.75%
2023	1,701	+0.14%
Source: INSEE

== See also ==
- Communes of the Aisne department
