= Maubeuge station =

Railway station in Maubeuge, France

Coordinates: 50°16′22″N 3°58′0″E

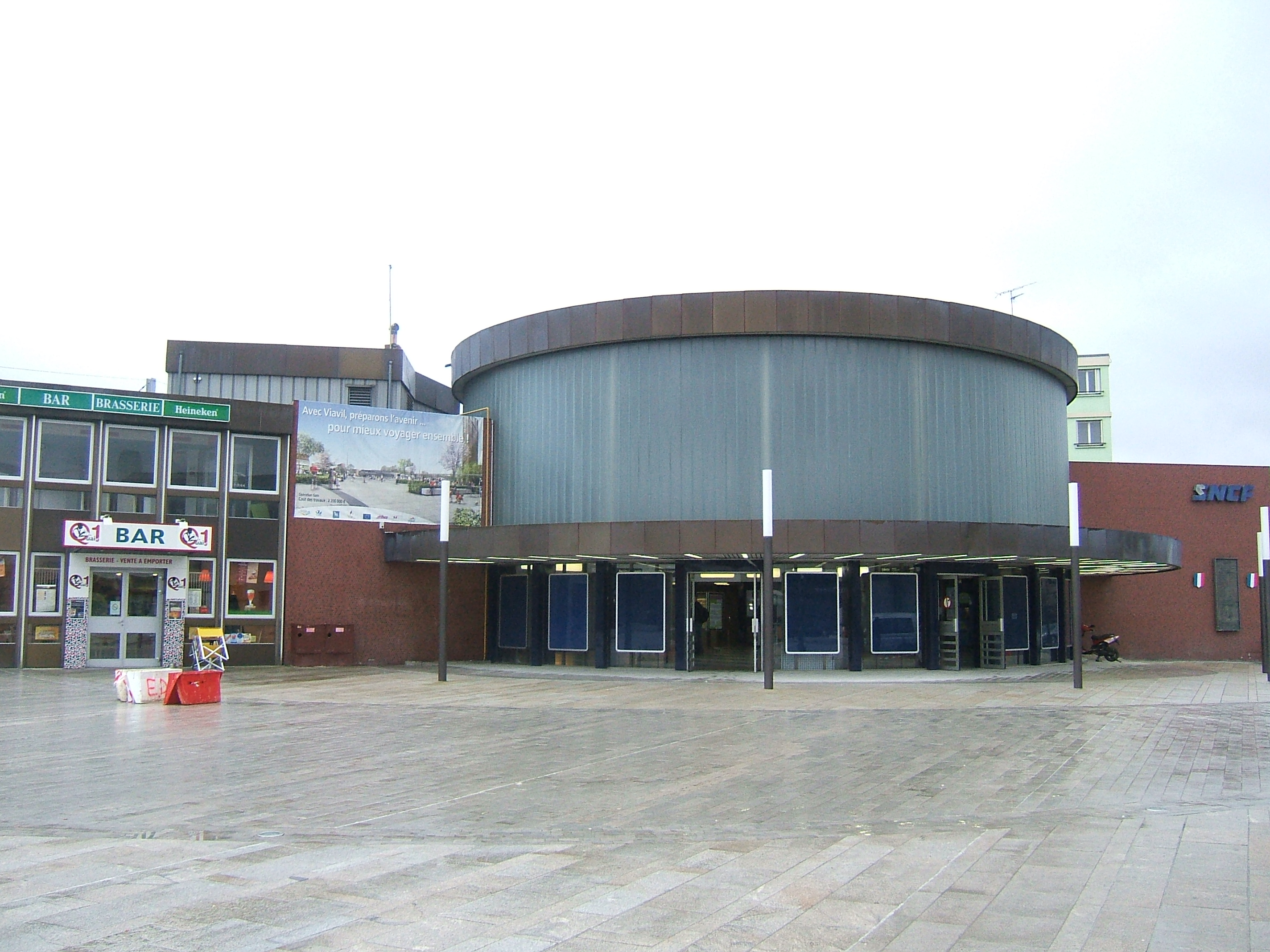
Maubeuge station passenger building, completed in 1978

Maubeuge is a railway station serving the town Maubeuge, Nord department, northern France. It is situated on the Creil–Jeumont railway.

== Services ==
The station is served by regional trains to Aulnoye-Aymeries, Valenciennes, Saint-Quentin, Charleroi and Lille.

Preceding station	TER Hauts-de-France	Following station
Terminus	Krono K13	Aulnoye-Aymeries towards Paris-Nord
Aulnoye-Aymeries towards Lille-Flandres	Krono K60	Jeumont Terminus
Terminus	Krono K82	Charleroi-South towards Namur
Louvroil towards Valenciennes	Proxi P60	Les Bons-Pères towards Jeumont
