= Flavy-le-Martel station =

Railway station in Flavy-le-Martel, France

Flavy-le-Martel
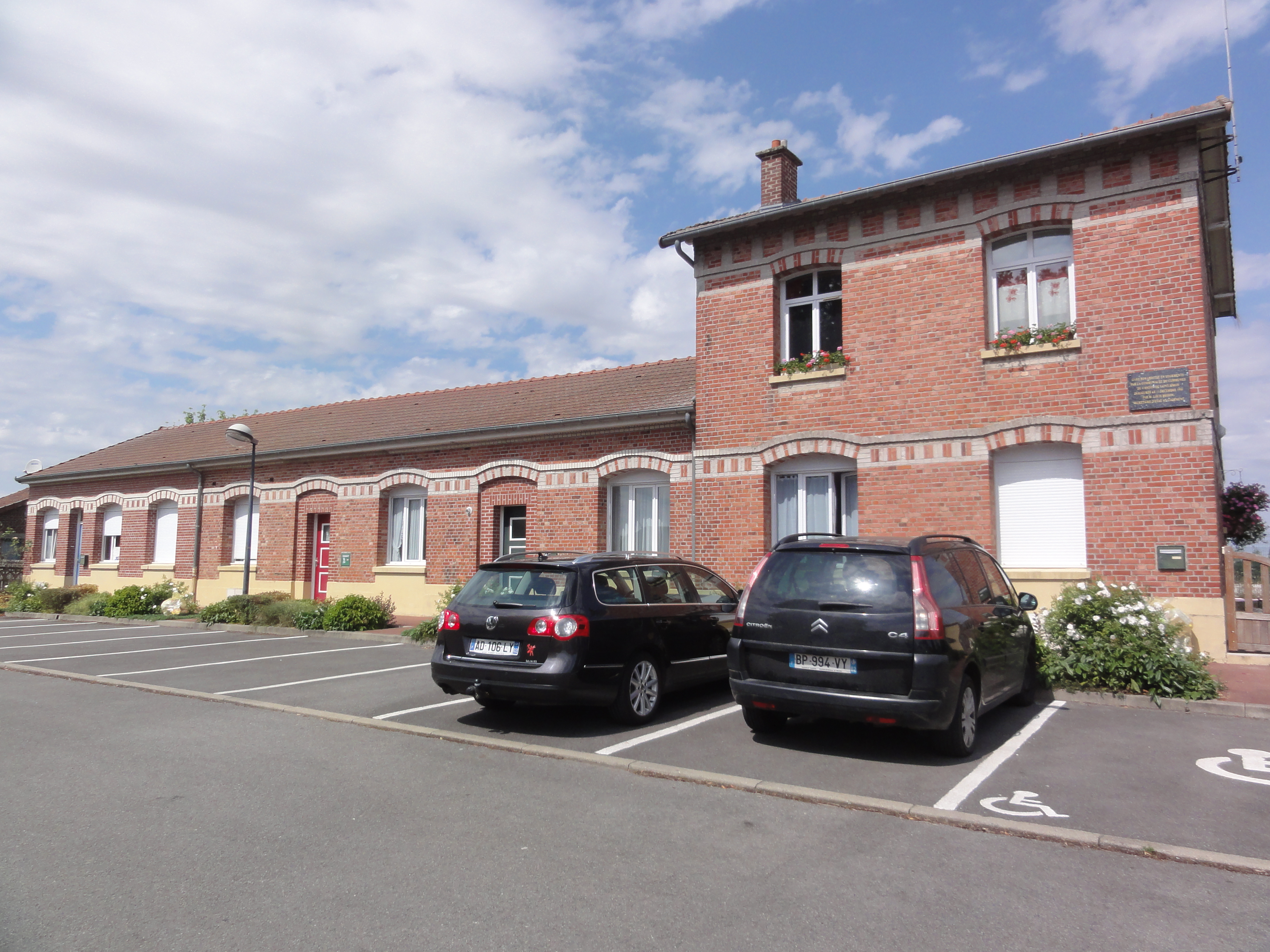
- Flavy-le-Martel station

General information
- Location: 02520 Flavy-le-Martel
- Coordinates: 49°43′10″N 3°11′5″E
- Owner: RFF/SNCF
- Line: Amiens–Laon railway
- Platforms: 2
- Tracks: 3

Other information
- Station code: 87296871

Services
Preceding station	TER Hauts-de-France	Following station
Ham (Somme) towards Amiens	Proxi P20	Mennessis towards Laon
Location

Flavy-le-Martel is a railway station located in the commune of Flavy-le-Martel in the Aisne department, France. The station is served by TER Hauts-de-France trains from Amiens to Laon.

== See also ==
- List of SNCF stations in Hauts-de-France
