= Creil–Jeumont railway =

Overview
- Status: Operational
- Owner: RFF
- Locale: France (Hauts-de-France)
- Termini: Creil station; Jeumont station

Service
- System: SNCF
- Operator(s): SNCF

History
- Opened: 1847-1855

Technical
- Line length: 187 km (116 mi)
- Number of tracks: Double track
- Track gauge: 1,435 mm (4 ft 8 1/2 in) standard gauge
- Electrification: 25 kV 50 Hz

The railway from Creil to Jeumont is an important French 187-kilometre long railway line, that connects Creil, a northern suburb of Paris, to Jeumont on the Belgian border. It was opened in several stages between 1847 and 1855. The opening of the LGV Nord high speed line from Paris to Lille in 1993 has decreased its importance for passenger traffic.

== Route ==
The Creil–Jeumont railway begins near the Gare de Creil, where it branches off the Paris–Lille railway. It follows the river Oise upstream on its right bank, in generally northeastern direction. It passes through Pont-Sainte-Maxence, Compiègne, Noyon and Chauny until it turns north at Tergnier, leaving the Oise valley. It reaches the river Somme at Saint-Quentin and continues northeast. It passes through Busigny, Le Cateau-Cambrésis, and reaches the river Sambre at Ors. It follows the Sambre downstream through Aulnoye-Aymeries and the industrial town Maubeuge until it reaches its terminus Jeumont. The railway continues to Erquelinnes and Charleroi in Belgium.

=== Main stations ===
The main stations on the Creil–Jeumont railway are:

- Gare de Creil
- Gare de Compiègne
- Gare de Saint-Quentin
- Gare d'Aulnoye-Aymeries
- Gare de Maubeuge
- Gare de Jeumont

== History ==
The railway was built by the Compagnie des chemins de fer du Nord. The first section that was opened in 1847 led from Creil, on the Paris–Lille railway, to Compiègne. The line was extended to Chauny in 1849, and to Saint-Quentin in 1850. Finally in 1855 the section from Saint-Quentin to Jeumont was opened. Being connected to the Belgian railway network at Hautmont (towards Mons, Brussels and Amsterdam) and at Jeumont (towards Charleroi, Liège and Cologne), the railway was very important for international traffic. Since the opening of the LGV Nord high speed line between Paris and Lille in 1993, most long-distance and all international passenger traffic has shifted away from the classical Creil–Jeumont line. It remains an important railway for freight traffic and regional passenger traffic.

== Services ==
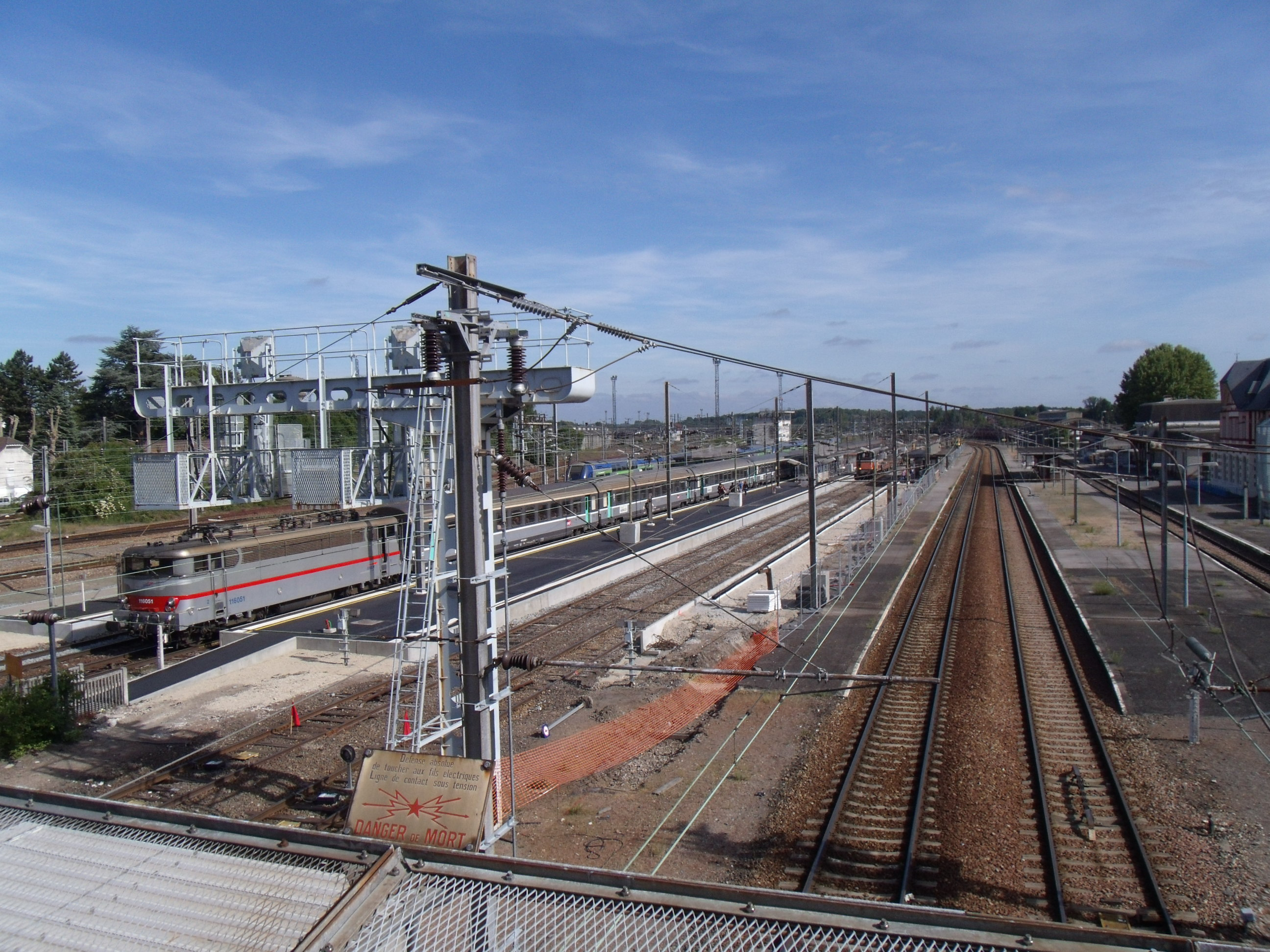
An Intercités train in Tergnier station

The Creil–Jeumont railway is used by the following passenger services:

- Intercités from Paris to Cambrai and Maubeuge on the section between Creil and Maubeuge
- TER Hauts-de-France regional services on the whole line

Freight trains also run along sections of the line.
