= Jussy, Aisne =

Jussy
- Commune
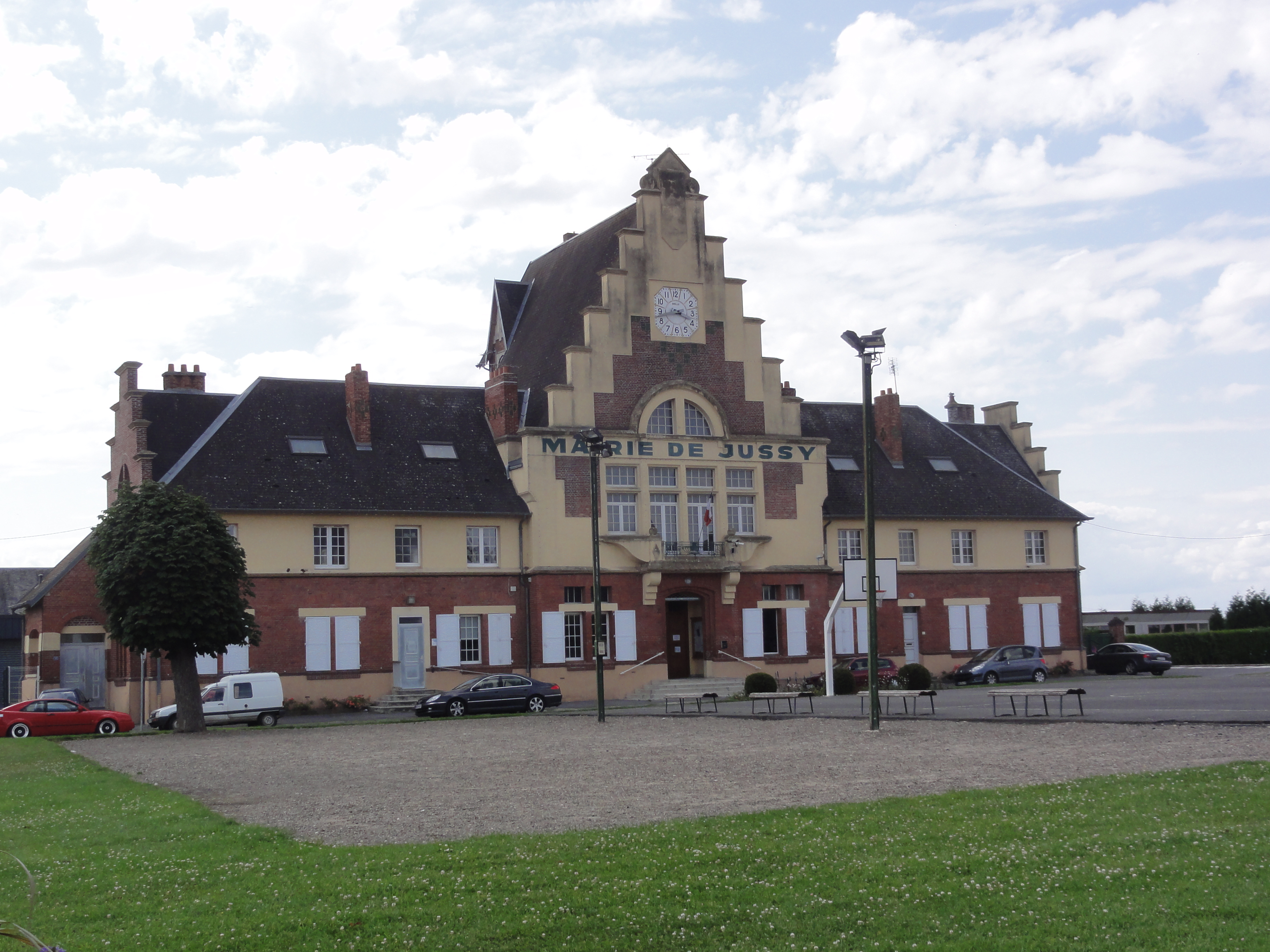
- The town hall of Jussy

- Coat of arms
- Location of Jussy
- Location within France Location within Hauts-de-France
- Coordinates: 49°43′15″N 3°13′56″E
- Country: France
- Region: Hauts-de-France
- Department: Aisne
- Arrondissement: Saint-Quentin
- Canton: Ribemont
- Intercommunality: CA Saint-Quentinois

Government
  - Mayor (2026–32): Pascal Petit
- Area^{1}: 13.37 km^{2} (5.16 sq mi)
- Elevation: 73 m (240 ft)
- Highest elevation: 91 m (299 ft)
- Lowest elevation: 61 m (200 ft)
- Population (2023): 1,153
  - Density: 86.24/km^{2} (223.4/sq mi)
- Time zone: UTC+01:00 (CET)
  - Summer (DST): UTC+02:00 (CEST)
- INSEE/Postal code: 02397 /02480
- ^{1} French Land Register data, which excludes lakes, ponds, glaciers > 1 km^{2} (0.386 sq mi or 247 acres) and river estuaries.

Jussy (French pronunciation: [ʒysi]) is a commune in the Aisne department in Hauts-de-France in northern France.

== Population ==
Historical population
Year	Pop.	±% p.a.
1968	1,094	—
1975	1,242	+1.83%
1982	1,194	−0.56%
1990	1,247	+0.54%
1999	1,289	+0.37%
2007	1,244	−0.44%
2012	1,229	−0.24%
2017	1,260	+0.50%
2023	1,153	−1.47%
Source: INSEE

== See also ==
- Communes of the Aisne department
