= Ham, Somme =

Ham Hin (Picard)
- Commune
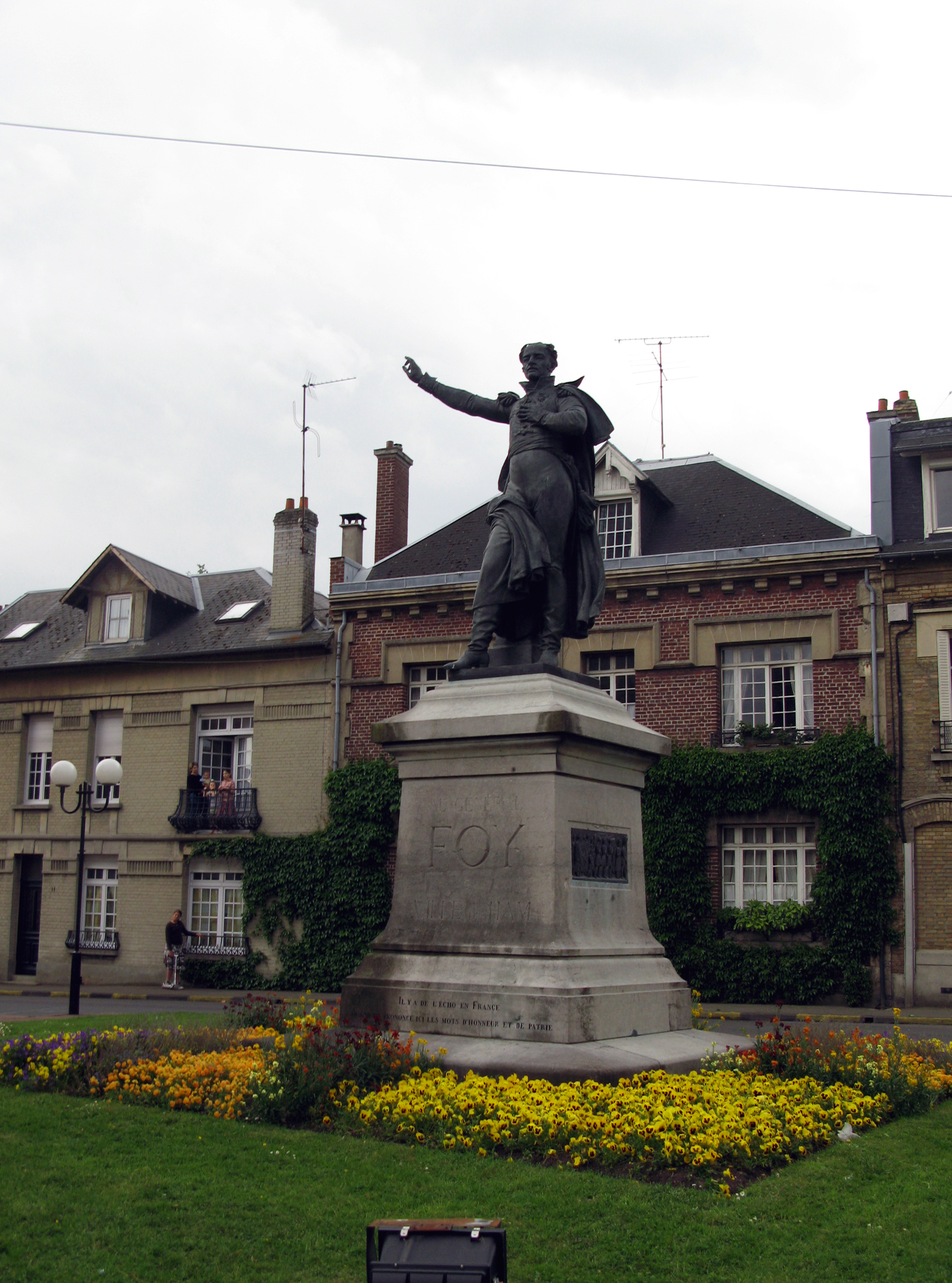
- Statue of General Foy

- Coat of arms
- Location of Ham
- Location within France Location within Hauts-de-France
- Coordinates: 49°44′50″N 3°04′25″E
- Country: France
- Region: Hauts-de-France
- Department: Somme
- Arrondissement: Péronne
- Canton: Ham
- Intercommunality: CC Est de la Somme

Government
  - Mayor (2020–2026): Eric Legrand
- Area^{1}: 9.5 km^{2} (3.7 sq mi)
- Elevation: 65 m (213 ft)
- Highest elevation: 84 m (276 ft)
- Lowest elevation: 57 m (187 ft)
- Population (2023): 4,378
  - Density: 460/km^{2} (1,200/sq mi)
- Time zone: UTC+01:00 (CET)
  - Summer (DST): UTC+02:00 (CEST)
- INSEE/Postal code: 80410 /80400
- ^{1} French Land Register data, which excludes lakes, ponds, glaciers > 1 km^{2} (0.386 sq mi or 247 acres) and river estuaries.

Ham (French pronunciation: [am]; Picard: Hin) is a commune in the Somme department in Hauts-de-France, northern France.

== Geography ==
Ham is situated on the D930 and D937 crossroads, some 21 kilometres (13 mi) southwest of Saint-Quentin, in the far southeast of the department, near the border with the department of the Aisne. Ham (Somme) station has rail connections to Amiens, Saint-Quentin and Laon. The nearby villages of Estouilly and Saint-Sulpice joined the commune of Ham in 1965 and 1966 respectively.

== Population ==
The population data given in the table and graph below for 1962 and earlier refer to the commune of Ham excluding Estouilly and Saint-Sulpice.

Historical population

Year	Pop.	±% p.a.
1793	1,720	—
1800	1,544	−1.53%
1806	1,771	+2.31%
1821	1,775	+0.02%
1831	1,883	+0.59%
1836	2,185	+3.02%
1841	2,537	+3.03%
1846	2,892	+2.65%
1851	2,375	−3.86%
1856	2,573	+1.61%
1861	2,873	+2.23%
1866	2,728	−1.03%
1872	2,733	+0.03%
1876	3,122	+3.38%
1881	3,043	−0.51%
1886	2,837	−1.39%
1891	3,082	+1.67%
1896	3,254	+1.09%
1901	3,300	+0.28%

Year	Pop.	±% p.a.
1906	3,233	−0.41%
1911	3,161	−0.45%
1921	2,097	−4.02%
1926	2,793	+5.90%
1931	2,787	−0.04%
1936	3,108	+2.20%
1946	3,166	+0.19%
1954	3,598	+1.61%
1962	4,204	+1.96%
1968	5,697	+5.20%
1975	6,074	+0.92%
1982	6,041	−0.08%
1990	5,532	−1.09%
1999	5,398	−0.27%
2007	5,207	−0.45%
2012	4,829	−1.50%
2017	4,611	−0.92%
2023	4,378	−0.86%

Source: EHESS and INSEE (1968-2023)

== History ==
Mentioned for the first time in 932 as a possession of the seigneur Erard, junior member of the Counts of Ponthieu. The town was later conquered by the Counts of Vermandois in the 12th century. In the 14th century it was owned by a family from Ham itself. From April 7 to June 3, 1917, Ham was home to the Lafayette Escadrille

== The Castle of Ham ==
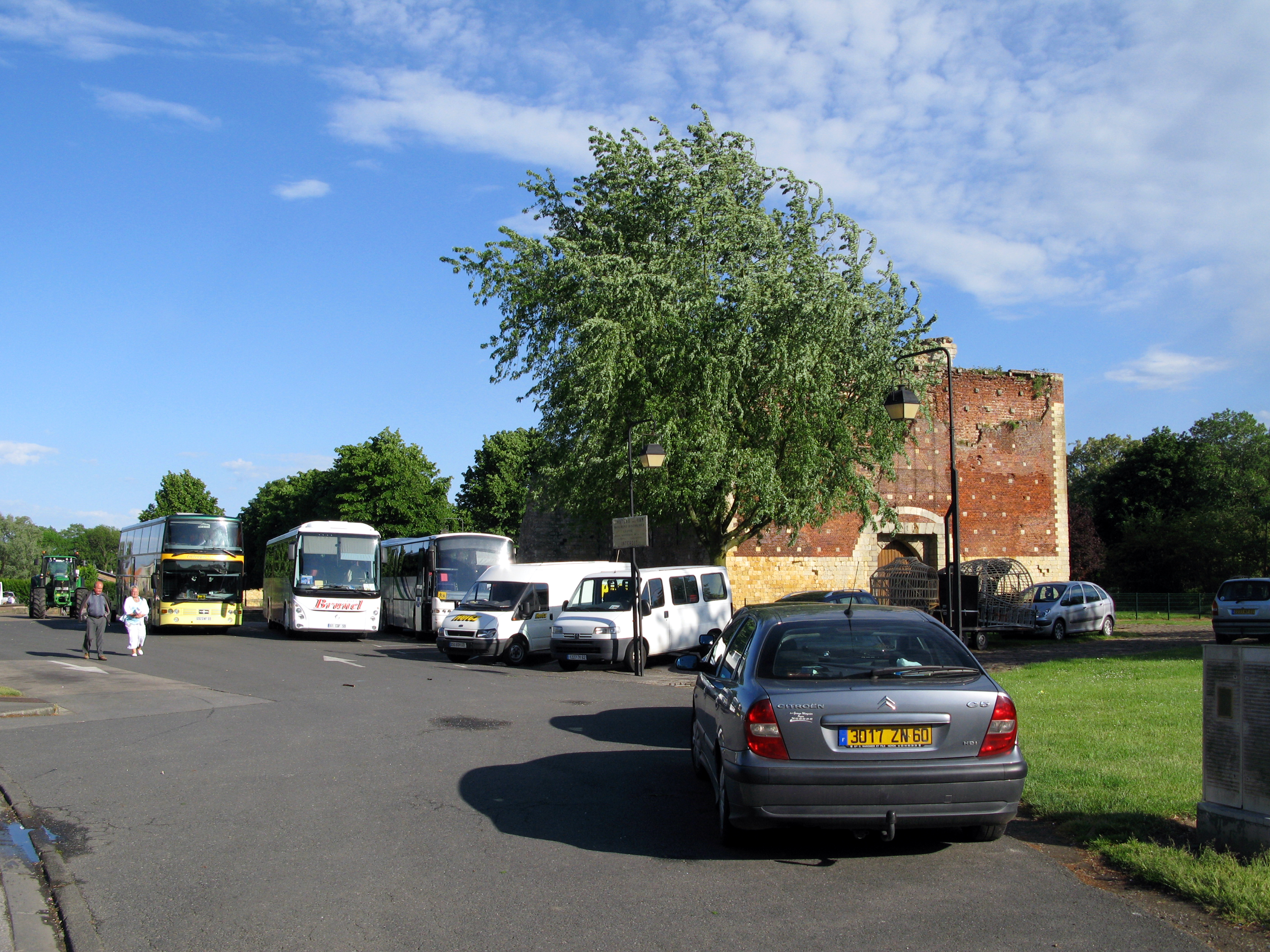
Car park and approach to the Château entrance

The first stone ramparts were put up in the 13th century by the local nobleman, Odon IV.

In the 15th century, the château was transformed into a formidable fortress by John II of Luxembourg, Count of Ligny.

In 1465, John's nephew, Louis of Luxembourg, built a huge donjon, 33m high, 33m in diameter with walls 11m thick.

In 1917, German forces blew up much of the château. All that remains are the entrance tower and vestiges of the donjon and ramparts.

== Personalities ==
- Francis de Bourbon, Count of St. Pol, Duke of Estouteville was born at Ham in 1491
- General Maximilien Sebastien Foy was born at Ham in 1775
- Jacques Cassard, intrepid sailor, was imprisoned at the château of Ham from 1726 to 1740.
- Louis Napoleon Bonaparte, accused of plotting against the state, was imprisoned at the château of Ham from 1840 to 1846, when he escaped, disguised as a worker, carrying a plank on his shoulder.
- Léon Accambray, French politician
- Jean-Charles Peltier, physicist and meteorologist
- Jean-Baptiste-Henri du Trousset de Valincourt (1643–1730), biographer of Louis XIV

== Twin towns ==
Eisfeld, Germany

== See also ==
- Communes of the Somme department
