= Fives–Hirson railway =

Railway line in France

Coordinates: 50.2707°N 3.5874°E

Fives–Hirson Railway
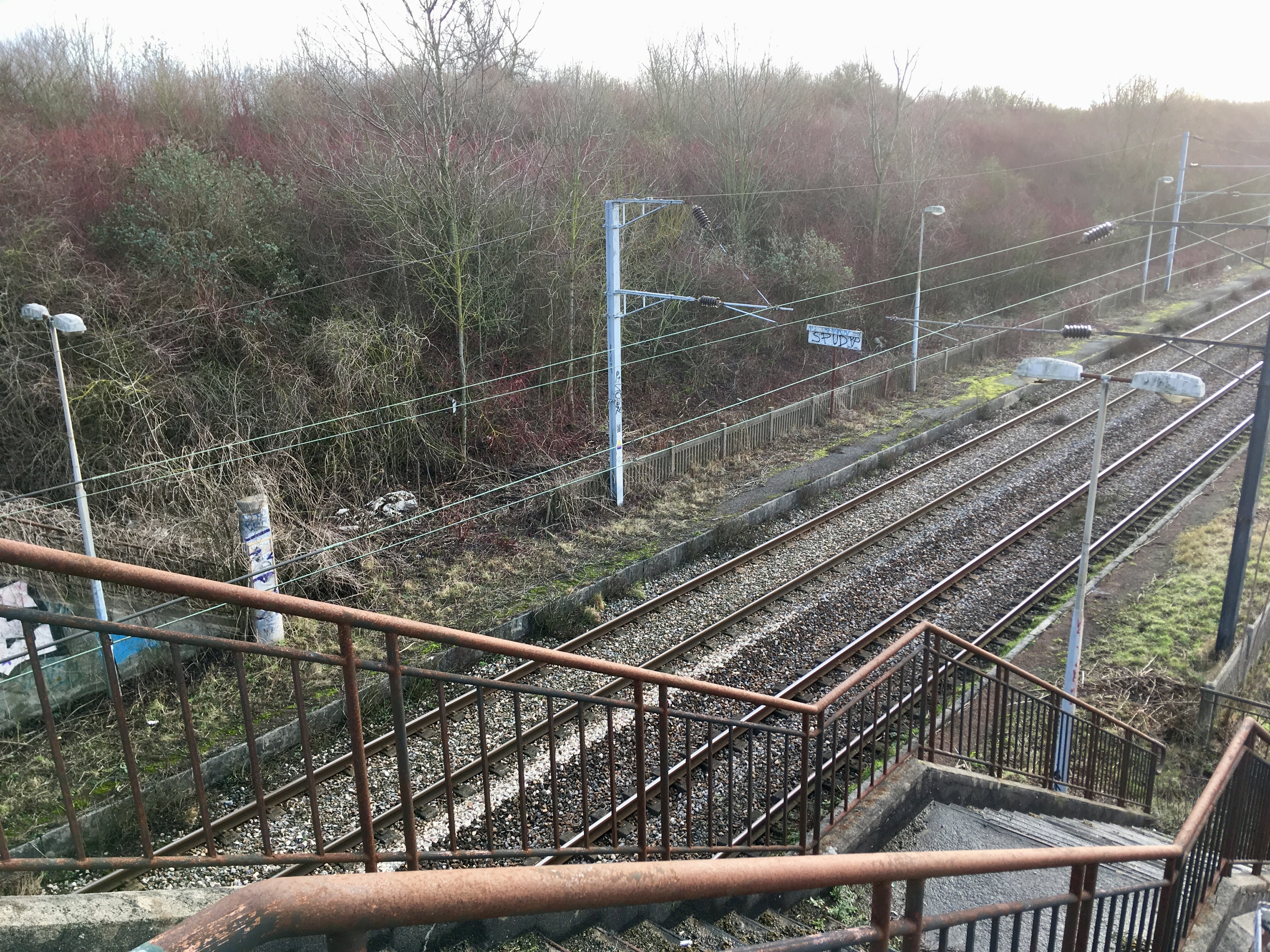
- Fives-Hirson railway

Overview
- Status: Open
- Owner: SNCF (1938–present)
- Locale: France (Hauts-de-France)
- Termini: Lille; Hirson

History
- Opened: 1869 - 1872

Technical
- Line length: 123 km (76 mi)
- Number of tracks: Double track
- Track gauge: 1,435 mm (4 ft 8 1/2 in) standard gauge

The Fives–Hirson railway is a double tracked electrified railway line linking Lille-Flandres with Hirson.

== History ==
The line opened in stages:

- Aulnoye to Hirson, 30 October 1869
- Lille to Gare de Valenciennes, 22 June 1870
- Valenciennes to Aulnoye, 1 September 1872

== Infrastructure ==
Electrification was complete by 1958. The line uses automatic block signalling (BAL, Bloc Automatique Lumineux).
