= Bussy, Oise =

Bussy
- Commune
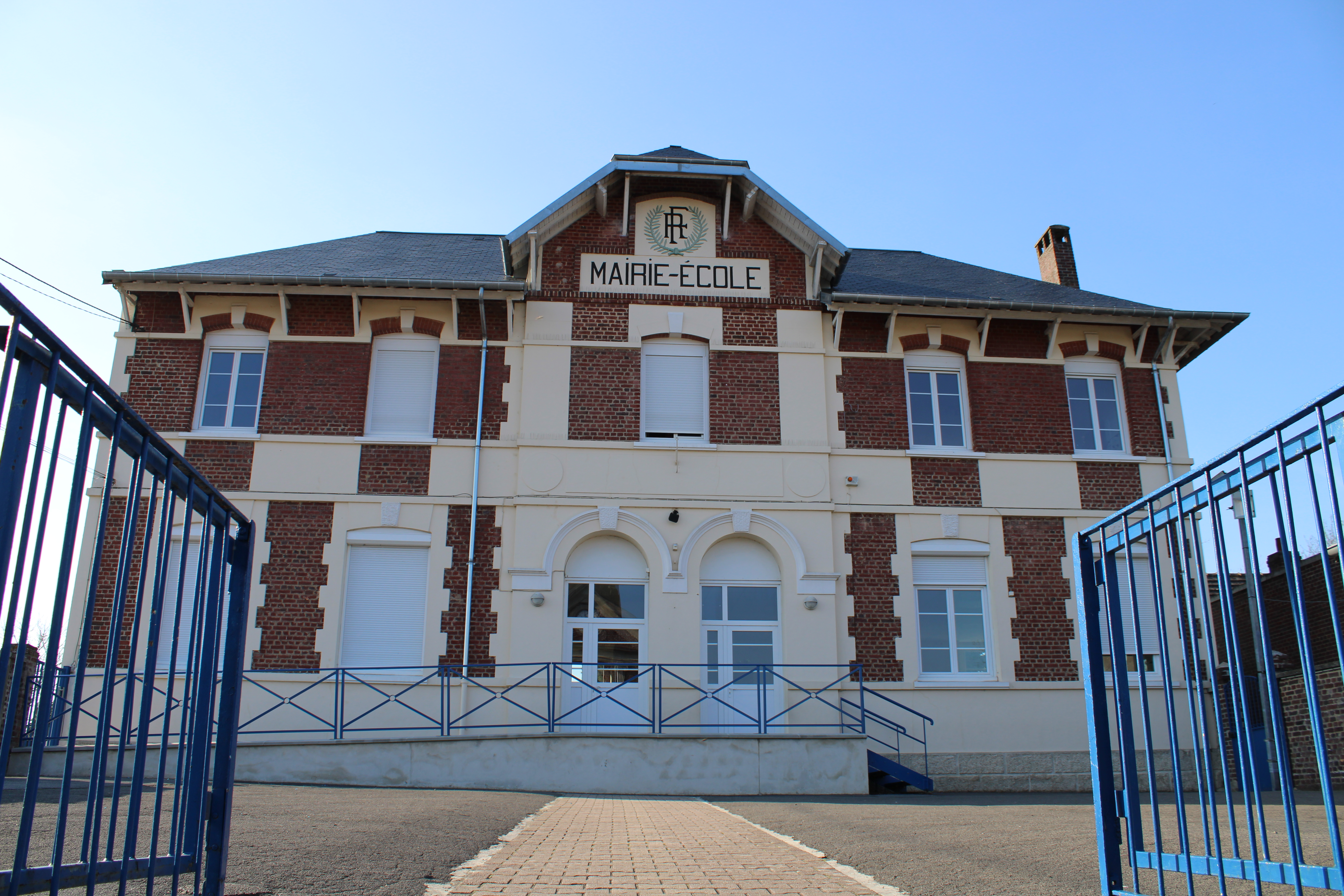
- Town hall
- Location of Bussy
- Location within France Location within Hauts-de-France
- Coordinates: 49°37′33″N 2°58′59″E
- Country: France
- Region: Hauts-de-France
- Department: Oise
- Arrondissement: Compiègne
- Canton: Noyon
- Intercommunality: Pays Noyonnais

Government
  - Mayor (2020–2026): Pascal Dollé
- Area^{1}: 3.87 km^{2} (1.49 sq mi)
- Elevation: 86 m (282 ft)
- Highest elevation: 88 m (289 ft)
- Lowest elevation: 43 m (141 ft)
- Population (2023): 305
  - Density: 78.8/km^{2} (204/sq mi)
- Time zone: UTC+01:00 (CET)
  - Summer (DST): UTC+02:00 (CEST)
- INSEE/Postal code: 60117 /60400
- ^{1} French Land Register data, which excludes lakes, ponds, glaciers > 1 km^{2} (0.386 sq mi or 247 acres) and river estuaries.

Bussy (French pronunciation: [bysi]) is a commune in the Oise department in northern France.

== Population ==
Historical population
Year	Pop.	±% p.a.
1968	127	—
1975	121	−0.69%
1982	179	+5.75%
1990	225	+2.90%
1999	246	+1.00%
2007	314	+3.10%
2012	307	−0.45%
2017	323	+1.02%
2023	305	−0.95%
Source: INSEE

== See also ==
- Communes of the Oise department
