= TER Picardie =

French regional rail network

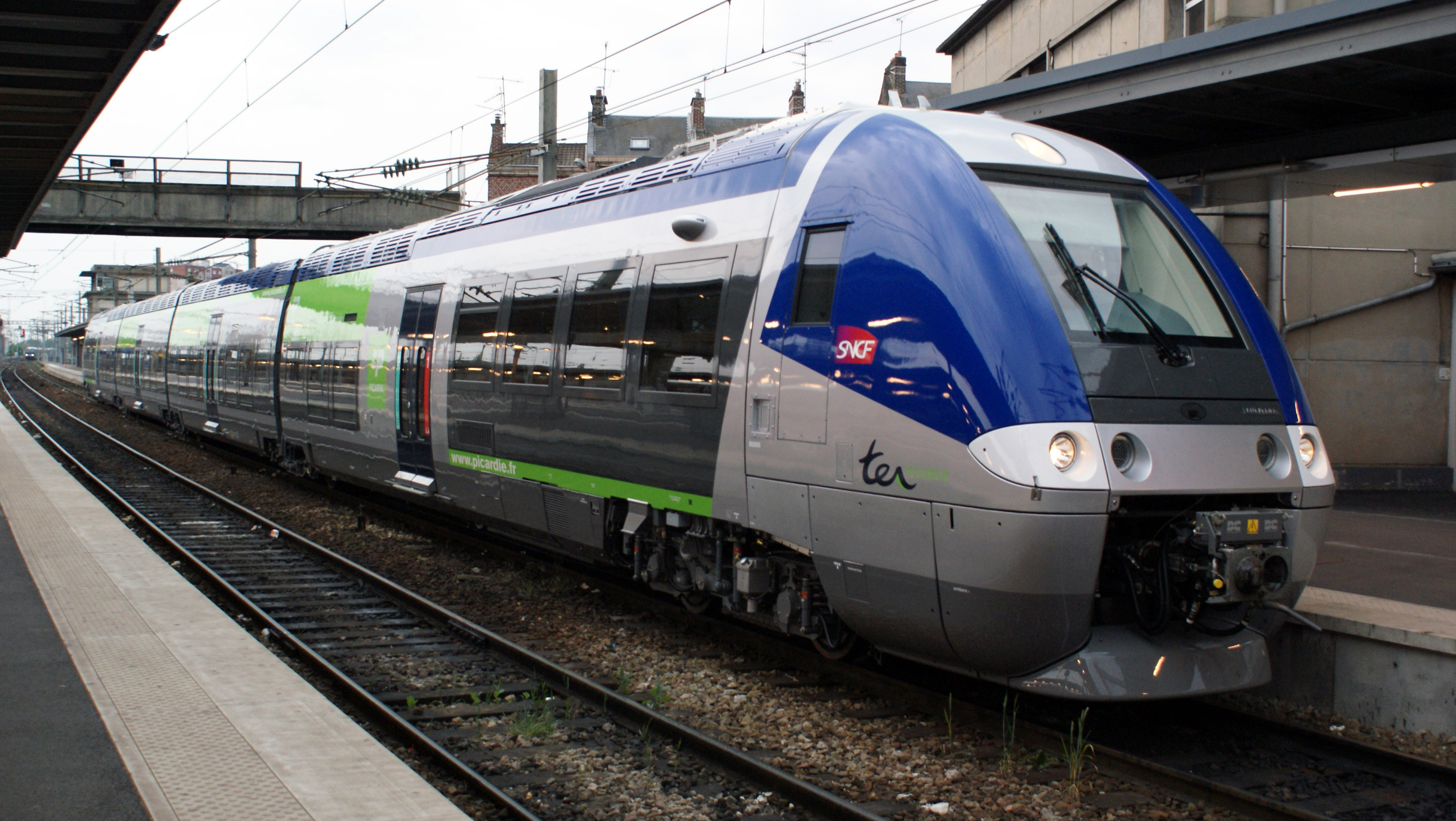

Overview
- Owner: SNCF
- Daily ridership: 56,600 (2010)
- Website: http://www.sncf.com/en/trains/ter

Operation
- Began operation: 1986; 40 years ago
- Ended operation: 27 August 2017; 9 years ago
- Operator: SNCF

Technical
- Track gauge: 1,435 mm (4 ft 8 1/2 in) standard gauge

TER Picardie was the regional rail network serving the Picardy region of France. On 27 August 2017, it was merged into the new TER Hauts-de-France. It was based at the Amiens station in the town of Amiens.

== Network ==
=== Rail ===
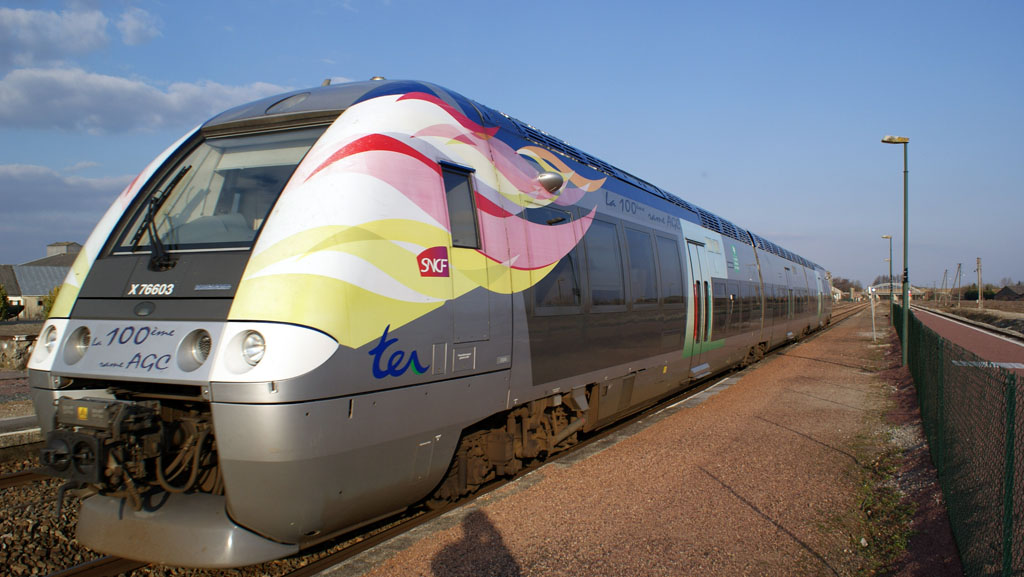
X76603/604 "100ème rame AGC" from TER Picardie in Chaulnes station (80).

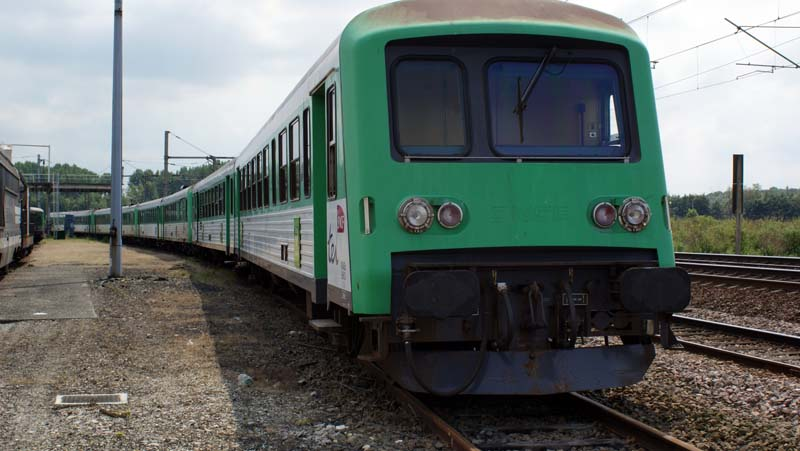
The 4 X4630 parked at Longueau depot (x4666-8663, x4716-8713, x4648-8437, x4659-8448)

Line	Route	Frequency	Notes
1	Amiens ... Albert ... Arras ... Douai ... Lille-Flandres		
2	Amiens ... Abancourt ... Serqueux ... Rouen-Rive-Droite		
3	Lille-Flandres ... Cambrai ... Busigny ... Saint Quentin ... Tergnier ... Laon		
4	Amiens ... Tergnier ... Laon ... Reims		
5	Hirson ... Marle-sur-Serre ... Laon		
5bis	Lille-Flandres ... Valenciennes ... Hirson ... Charleville-Mézières (see TER Nord-Pas-de-Calais line 17 for details)		
6	Paris-Nord – Mitry-Claye† – Dammartin-Juilly-Saint-Mard† – Le Plessis-Belleville† – Nanteuil-le-Haudouin† – Ormoy-Villers† – Crépy-en-Valois – Vaumoise† – Villers-Cotterêts – Corcy† – Longpont† – Vierzy† – Soissons – Crouy† – Margival† – Vauxaillon† – Anizy-Pinon – Clacy-Mons† – La Neuville-sous-Laon† – Laon		
9	La Ferté-Milon ... Fismes ... Reims		
10	Château-Thierry ... Épernay ... Reims (see TER Champagne-Ardenne for details)		
11	Amiens ... Ham ... Saint-Quentin		some trains run via Tergnier
12	Busigny – Bohain† – Saint-Quentin – Montescourt† – Mennessis† – Tergnier – Viry-Noureuil† – Chauny – Appilly† – Noyon – Ourscamps† – Ribécourt† – Thourotte† – Longueil-Annel† – Choisy-au-Bac† – Compiègne – Jaux† – Le Meux-Lacroix-Saint-Ouen† – Longueil-Sainte-Marie† – Chevrières† – Pont-Sainte-Maxence – Rieux-Angicourt† – Villers-Saint-Paul† – Creil – Paris-Nord		
16	Amiens ... Montdidier ... Compiègne		
17	Gisors ... Pontoise ... Paris-Saint-Lazare (see Transilien J for details)		
18	Creil ... Persan–Beaumont ... Pontoise (see Transilien H for details)		
19	Beauvais – Villers-sur-Thère† – Saint-Sulpice-Auteuil† – Laboissière-Le Déluge† – Méru – Esches† – Bornel-Belle-Église – Chambly – Persan–Beaumont – Paris-Nord		
20	Beauvais ... Creil		
21	Le Tréport-Mers ... Abancourt ... Marseille-en-Beauvaisis ... Beauvais		
22	Amiens – Longueau – Boves† – Dommartin-Remiencourt† – Ailly-sur-Noye – La Faloise† – Breteuil-Embranchement – Gannes† – Saint-Just-en-Chaussée – Saint-Remy-en-l'Eau† – Avrechy† – Clermont-de-l'Oise – Liancourt-Rantigny† – Laigneville† – Creil – Chantilly-Gouvieux† – Orry-la-Ville-Coye† – Paris-Nord		
23	Creil ... Paris-Nord (see lines 12 and 22)		
24	Amiens ... Abbeville ... Rue ... Étaples-Le Touquet ... Boulogne-Ville ... Calais-Ville		
25	Le Tréport-Mers – Eu – Woincourt – Feuquières-Fressenneville – Feuquerolles – Chépy-Valines – Acheux-Franleu – Quesnoy-le-Montant – Abbeville		
† Not all trains called at this station

=== Road ===
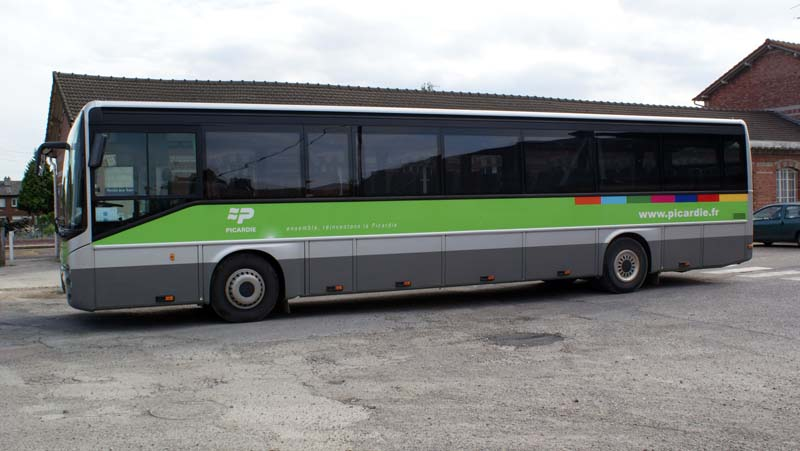
Bus of line 15 (Montdidier/Chaulnes/Roisel) in station of Chaulnes (80).

From 1 July 2009

Relations by road way	Line
Laon ↔ Liart	Line 8
Saint-Just-en-Chaussée ↔ Montdidier	Line 14
Montdidier ↔ Chaulnes ↔ Péronne ↔ Roisel	Line 15
Amiens ↔ Beauvais	Line 30
Creil ↔ Senlis ↔ Roissy	Line 31
Amiens ↔ TGV Haute Picardie	Line 32
Saint-Quentin ↔ TGV Haute Picardie	Line 33

== Rolling stock ==
=== Multiple units ===
- SNCF Class Z 26500
- SNCF Class X 4630
- SNCF Class X 72500
- SNCF Class X 73500
- SNCF Class X 76500 Also called XGC X 76500

=== Locomotives ===
- SNCF Class BB 15000R
- SNCF Class BB 16100
- SNCF Class BB 16500
- SNCF Class BB 66400
- SNCF Class BB 67300
- SNCF Class BB 67400
- SNCF Class BB 69400

=== Cars and trailers travellers ===
- Rame réversible régionale
- RIO NPDC
- RIO 80
- Cars VTU
  - A10tu VTU 75/80
  - B10rtu VTU 75/78
  - B10tu VTU 75/78
  - B11rtu VTU 75/78
  - B11tu VTU 75/78
- Cars VU
  - B9u VU75
  - B6DUX rév VU 86
- Cars V2N
- Cars VO2N

== See also ==
- SNCF
- Transport express régional
- Réseau Ferré de France
- List of SNCF stations in Picardy
- Picardy
