= Montdidier station =

French railway station

Montdidier
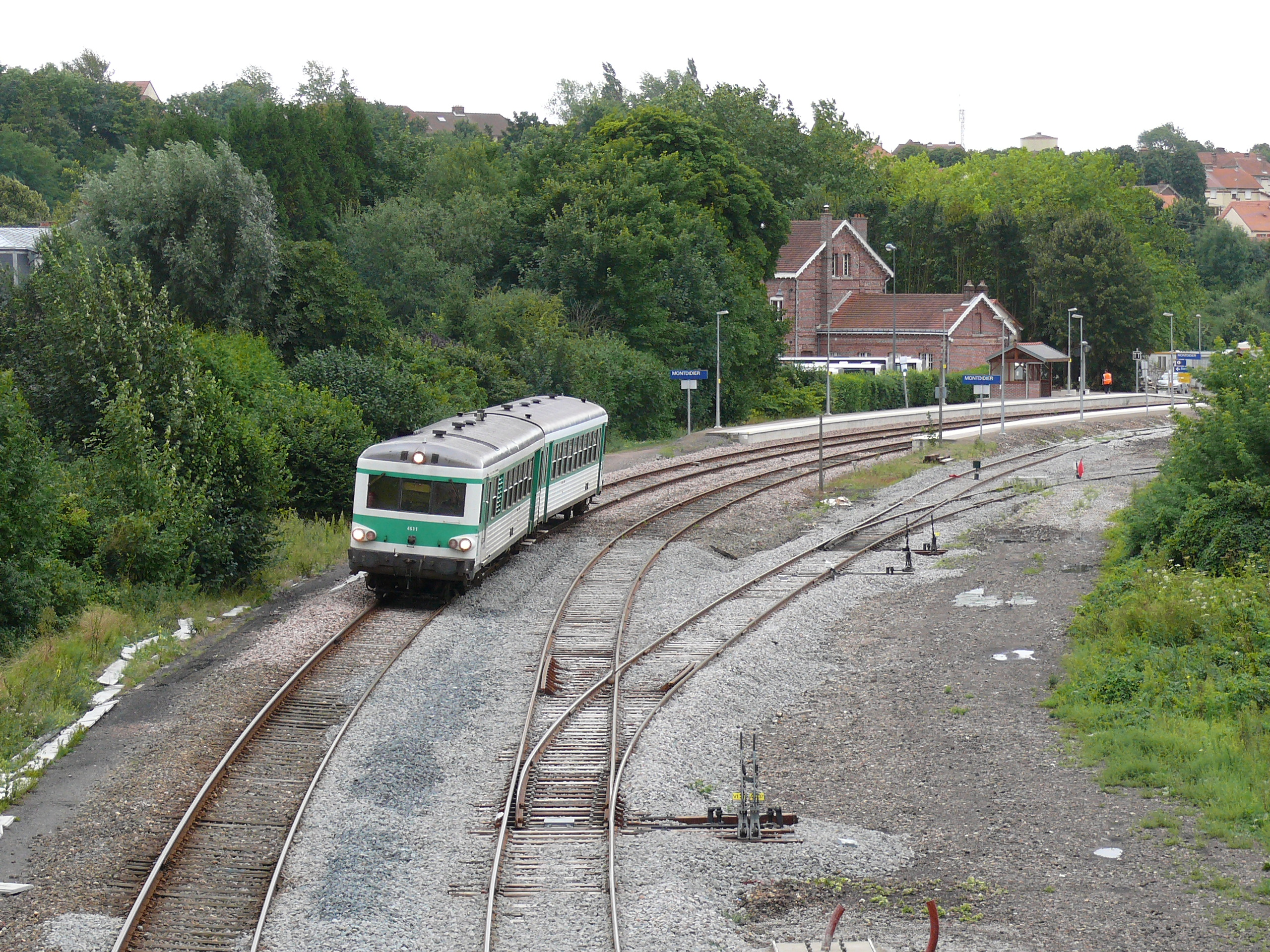
- View of the station from the bridge carrying old Route nationale 30 across the tracks

General information
- Location: Montdidier
- Coordinates: 49°38′30″N 2°33′45″E
- Owner: RFF/SNCF
- Platforms: 2
- Tracks: 2

Other information
- Station code: 87313346

History
- Opened: 1883

Services
Preceding station	TER Hauts-de-France	Following station
Hargicourt—Pierrepont towards Amiens	Proxi P23	Tricot towards Compiègne

Other services
	Disused railways	
Domfront-Domélien	SNCF; Saint-Just-en-Chaussée - Douai line	Faverolles
Terminus	Montdidier - Fricourt line Metre gauge	Montdidier Halte
Terminus	Montdidier - Noyon line Metre gauge	Ayencourt
Location

Montdidier is a railway station located in the commune of Montdidier in the Somme department, France.

== The station ==
The station is located at kilometre point 100.155 on the partly abandoned single-track metre-gauge line between Saint-Just-en-Chaussée and Douai and at kilometre point 115.358 on the also partly abandoned line between Ormoy-Villers and Boves. The station is served by TER Hauts-de-France trains on the Amiens - Compiègne line.

The placement of the station building is unusual, perpendicular to the tracks. The line to Amiens runs alongside its west gable, while the now disused lines to Cambrai and to Saint-Just-en-Chaussée and Roisel ran alongside the west gable. The two lines connected a short distance from the passenger building.

The line was formerly two-track but was reduced to a single track in the 1980s; Montdidier, Moreuil and Estrées-Saint-Denis are the only remaining intermediate points where trains can pass each other.

In 2003, the station was improved and made accessible to the handicapped as part of a modernisation of the Amiens - Compiègne link financed under the 12th French state-regional contractual plan.

The station has a bicycle shelter and an electronic board announcing trains.

== History ==
Montdidier was formerly a very important junction between the lines to Amiens and to Cambrai.

Coal trains from the mining region travelled to Creil and the large marshalling yards in the North Paris region via Estrées-St-Denis and Longueil-Ste-Marie, joining the line to Amiens at Estrées.

The rails have been removed between Roye and Montdidier (Cambrai - Paris Nord line), and between Estrées-St-Denis et Longueil-Ste-Marie. Only one track has been retained to preserve the TER connection between Amiens and Creil; between Estrées and Compiègne, the line was always single-track. Goods traffic on the line is today almost nonexistent, whereas for some years it was one of the heaviest in France.

A third single-track, metre-gauge line ran from Montdidier towards St-Just-en-Chaussée and merged with the line from Lille to Paris via Longueau and Creil and the line from Boulogne to Paris via Amiens, Longueau and Creil. This was one of the main lines of the Nord company, and then of the SNCF, until the introduction of TGV routes.

The station formerly also allowed connections to the metre-gauge lines in the Somme operated by the Société générale des chemins de fer économiques from Albert via Rosières and from Noyon via Roye-sur-Matz (Oise region).

== Gallery ==
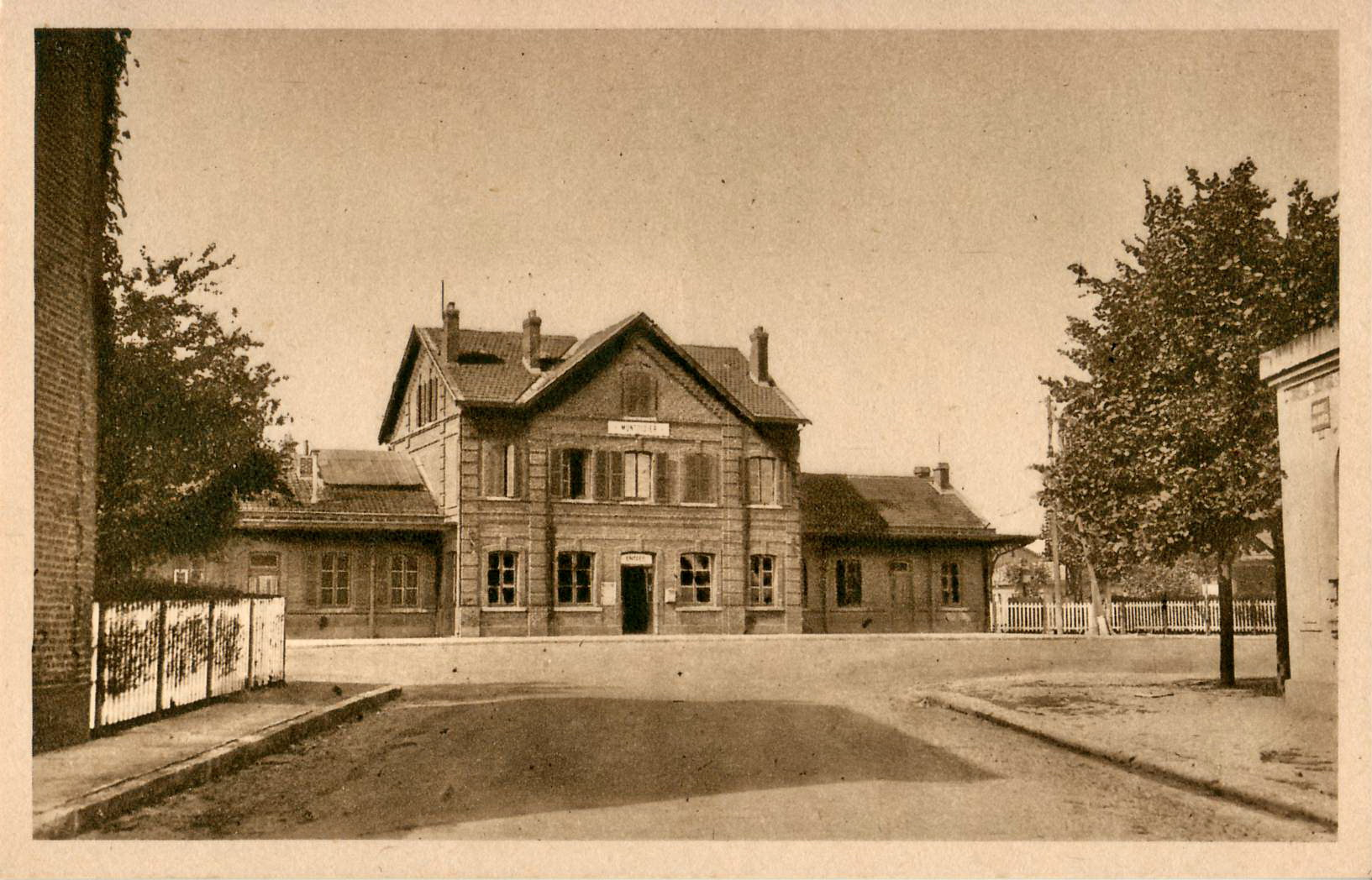
Front of the station in the first half of the 20th century, little changed today

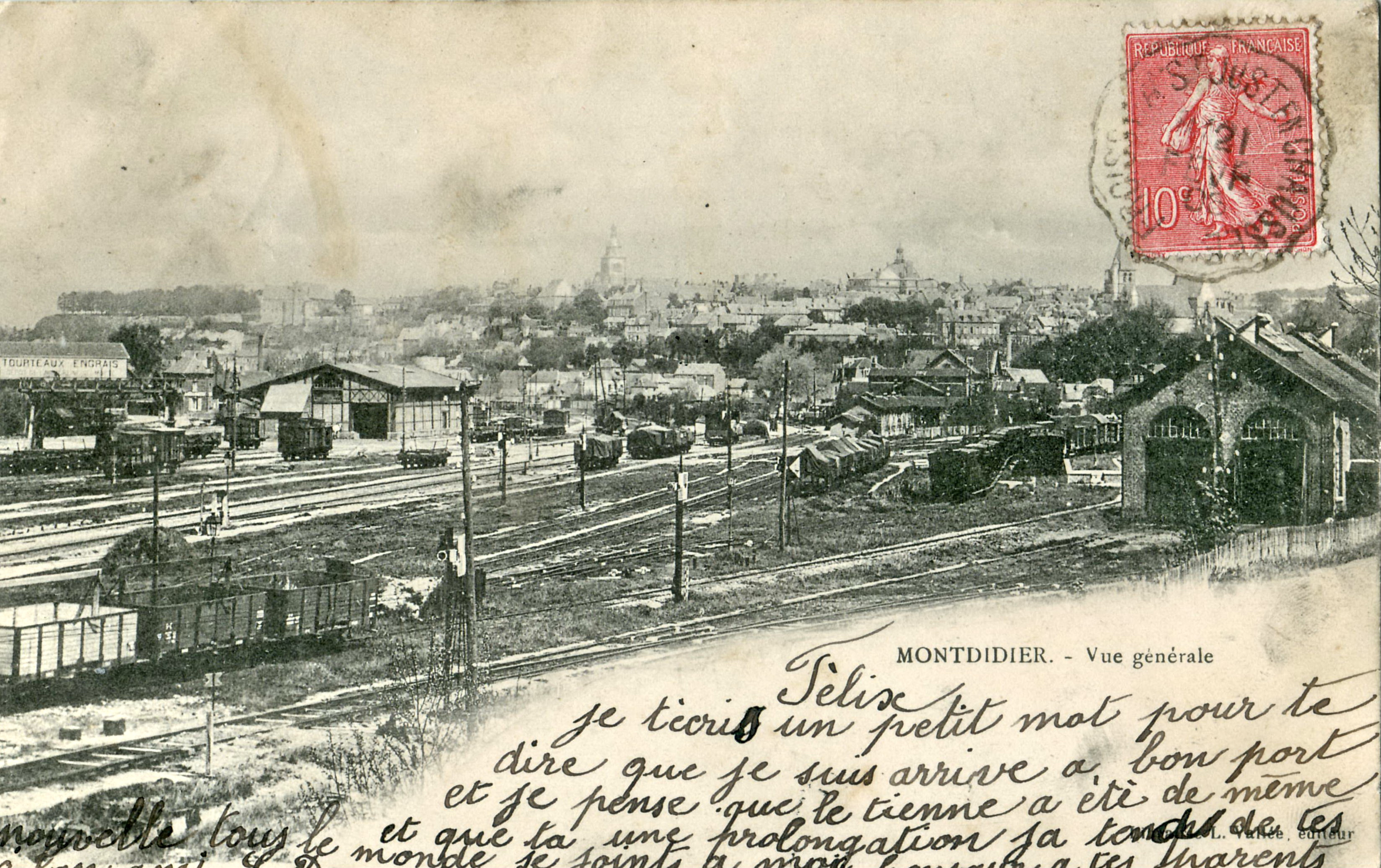
View of Montdidier from the station, early 20th century

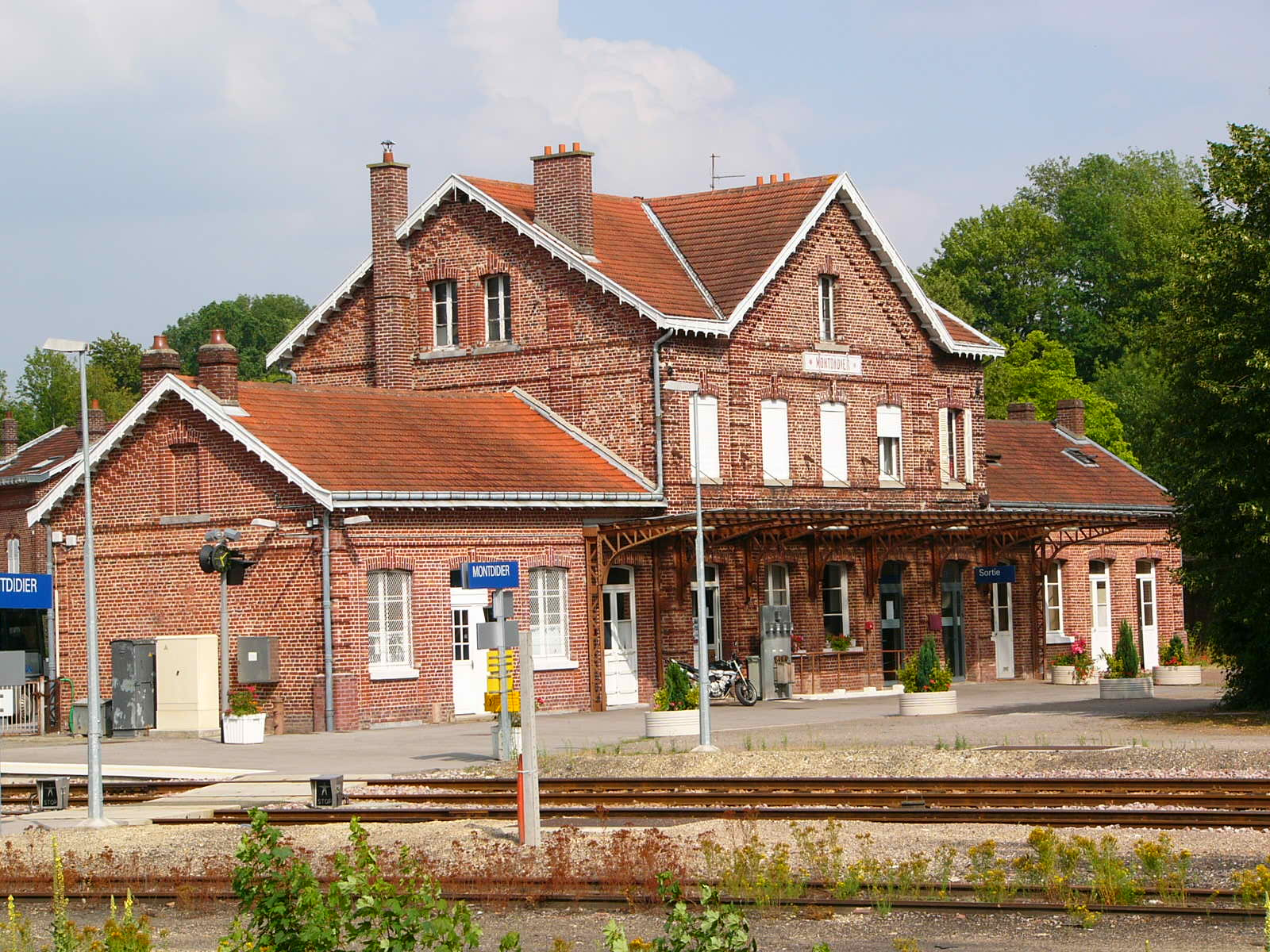
Station building

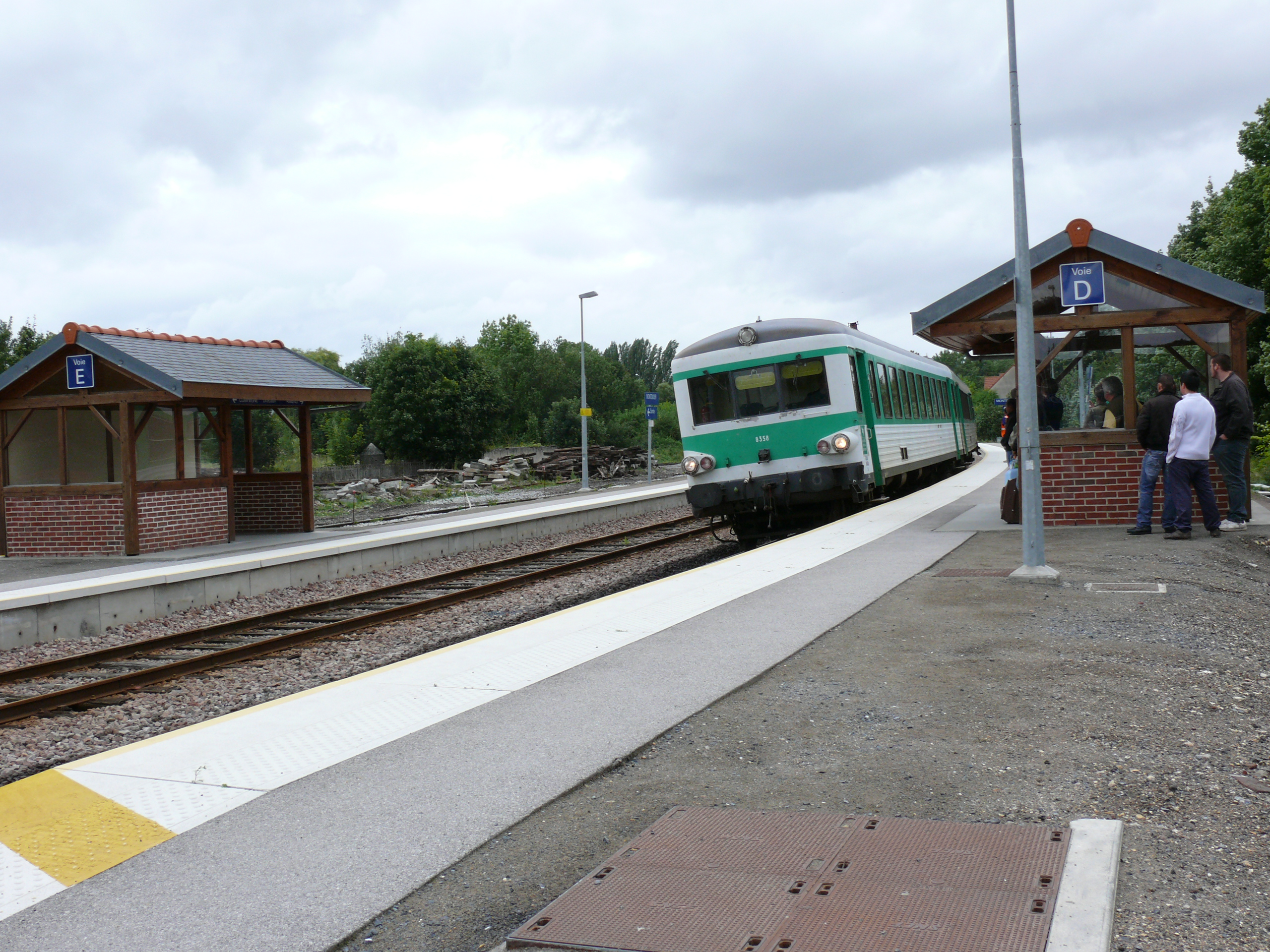
Platforms after 2003 modernisation

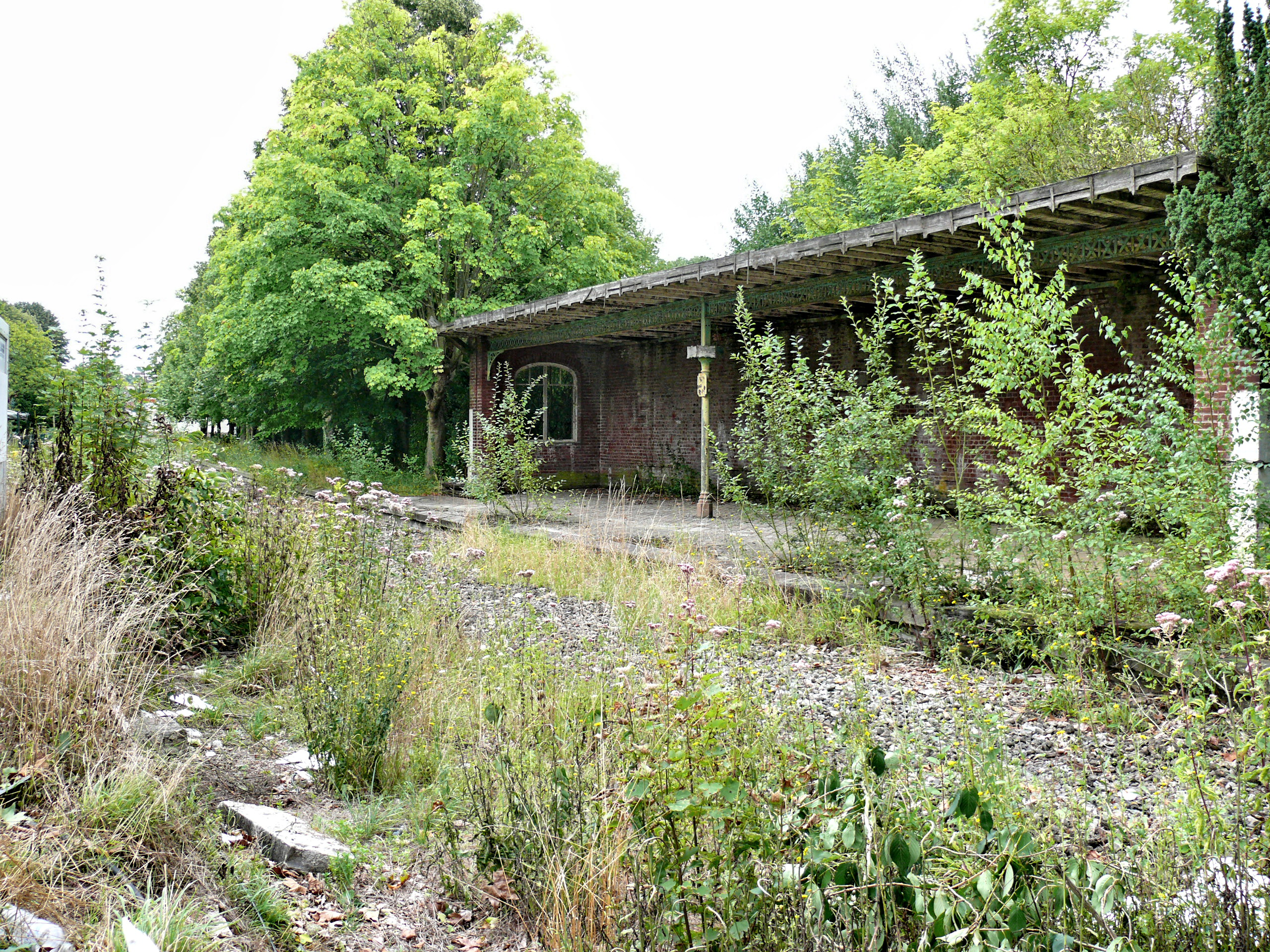
Remains of platforms for the Cambrai line, long abandoned

== See also ==
- List of SNCF stations in Hauts-de-France
