= Lamotte-Brebière station =

Former railway station in Hauts-de-France, France

Coordinates: 49.8855°N 2.3973°E

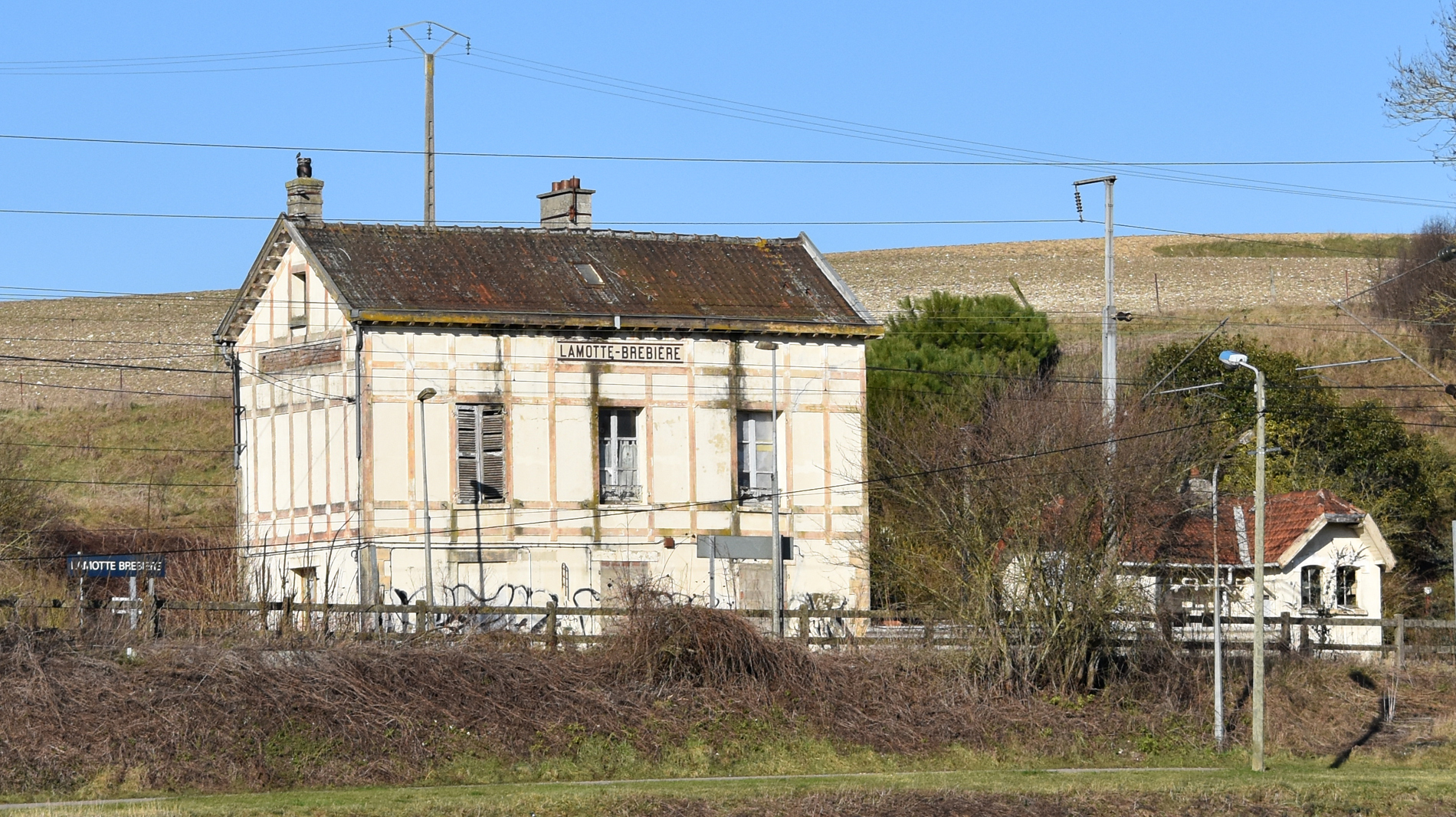
Station building in 2019

Lamotte-Brebière is a former railway station serving the French town of Lamotte-Brebière in the Somme department. It is situated on the Paris–Lille railway. The station was served by local TER Picardie services between Lille and Amiens. It was closed for passenger trains in 2011.
