= Wiencourt-l'Équipée station =

Railway station in Wiencourt-l'Équipée, France

Wiencourt-l'Équipée

General information
- Location: Wiencourt-l'Équipée
- Coordinates: 49°50′54″N 2°36′48″E
- Owner: RFF/SNCF
- Line: Amiens–Laon railway
- Platforms: 2
- Tracks: 2

Other information
- Station code: 87316281
Location

Wiencourt-l'Équipée is a former railway station located in the commune of Guillaucourt in the Somme department, France. The station was served by TER Picardie trains from Amiens to Reims and Saint-Quentin.

== See also ==
- List of SNCF stations in Hauts-de-France
