= Breteuil-Embranchement station =

Railway station in Bacouël, Oise, France

Breteuil-Embranchement
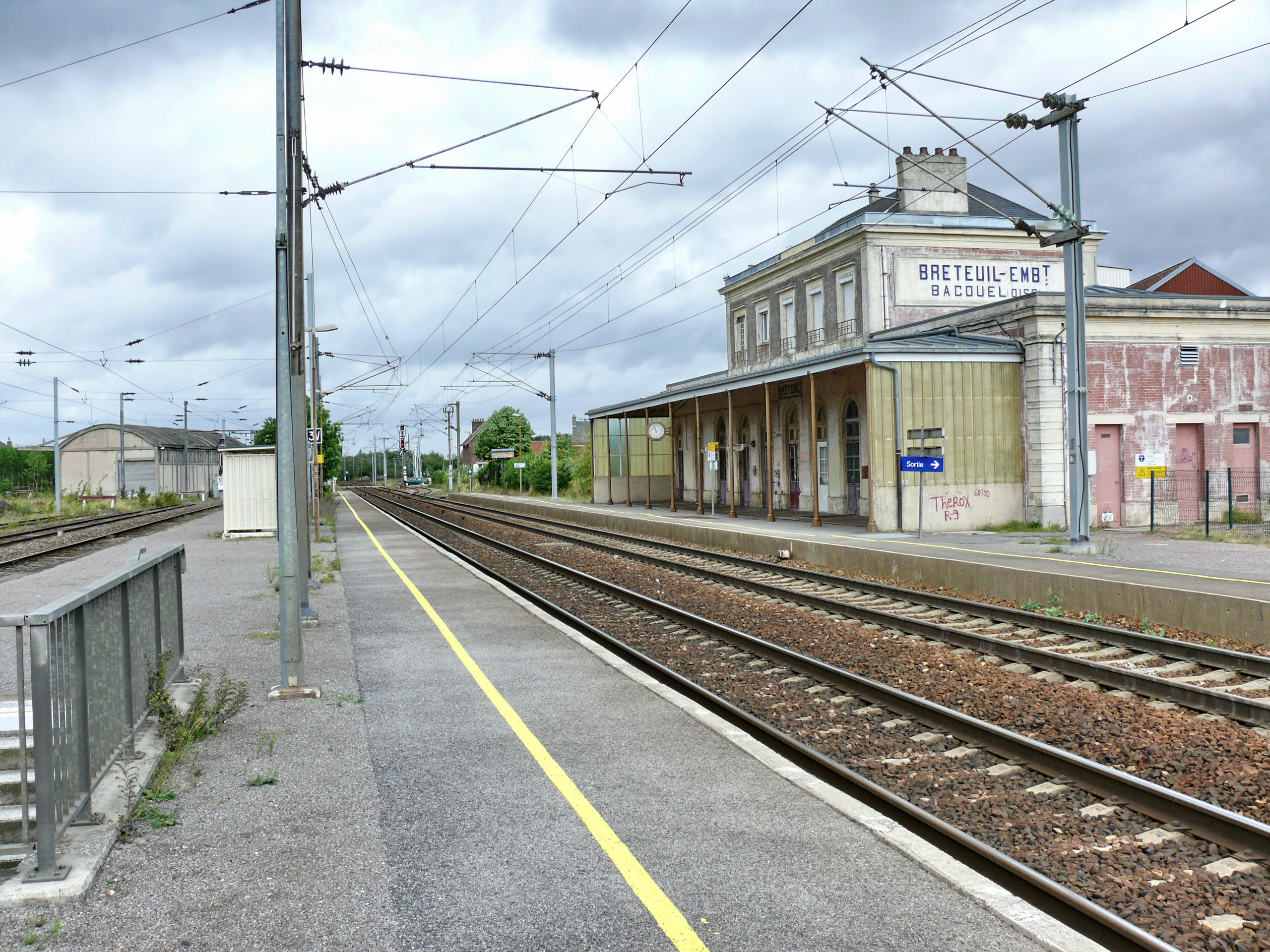

General information
- Location: Breteuil-Embranchement, Bacouël
- Coordinates: 49°37′35″N 2°23′4″E
- Owner: RFF/SNCF
- Line: Paris–Lille railway
- Platforms: 3
- Tracks: 3

Other information
- Station code: 87313247

History
- Opened: 1846

Services
Preceding station	TER Hauts-de-France	Following station
Ailly-sur-Noye towards Amiens	Citi C10	Saint-Just-en-Chaussée towards Paris-Nord
La Faloise towards Amiens	Proxi P10	Gannes towards Creil
Location

Breteuil-Embranchement is a railway station on the Paris-Nord–Lille line located in the commune of Bacouël in the Oise department, France. It is surrounded by a hamlet also named Breteuil-Embranchement.

The station is served by TER Hauts-de-France trains.

An underground walkway allows passengers to cross the tracks, but makes the station inaccessible to the handicapped. The station has an unused freight storage building and sidings.

As the station name indicates, there was formerly a short branch line from here to Breteuil-sur-Noye, which had been passed by when the line from Paris Nord to Lille was constructed.

== Gallery ==
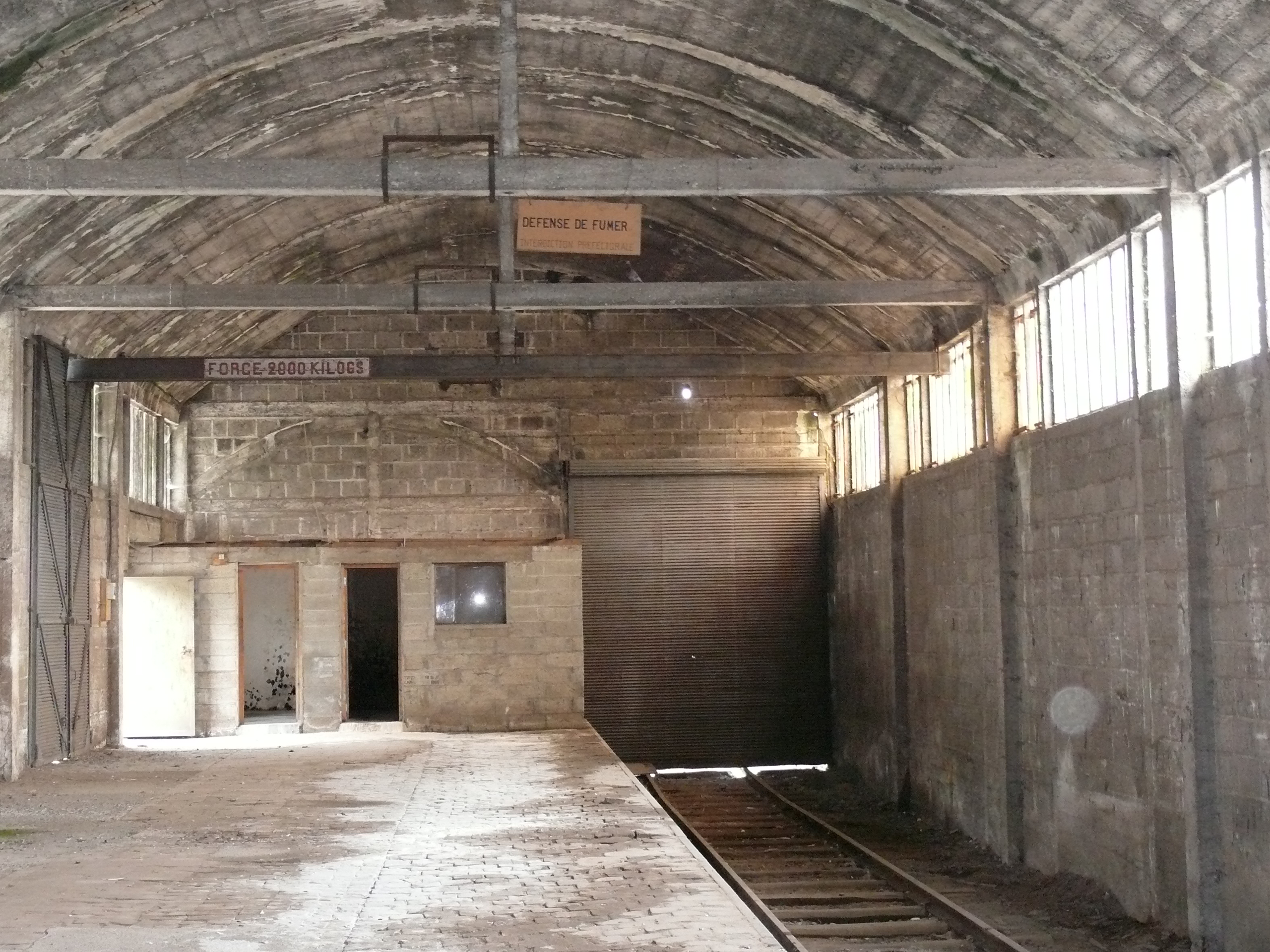
Interior of the small reinforced concrete freight building

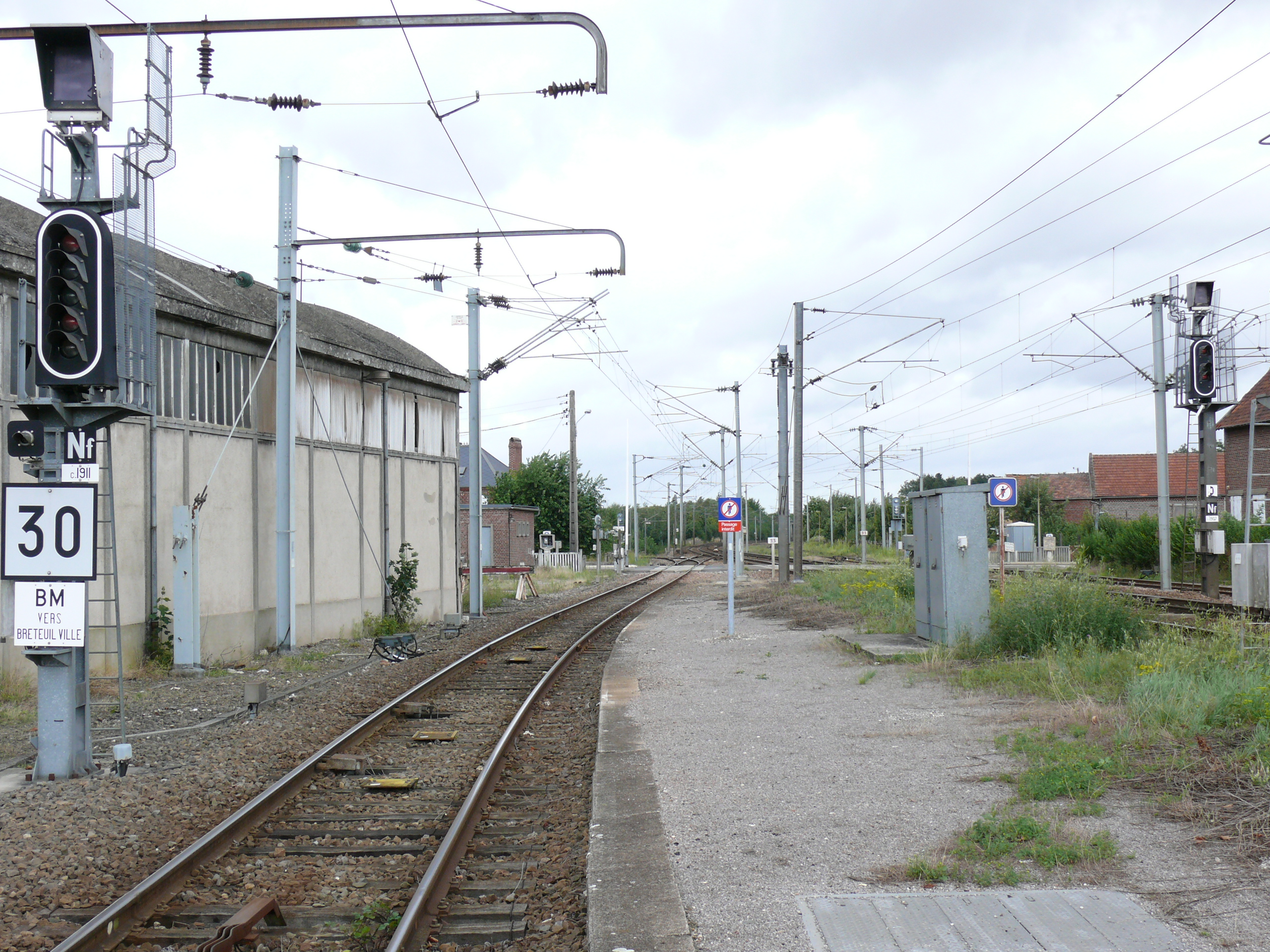
Looking from the station towards Longueau. The junction where the line to Breteuil branched off is visible in the distance.

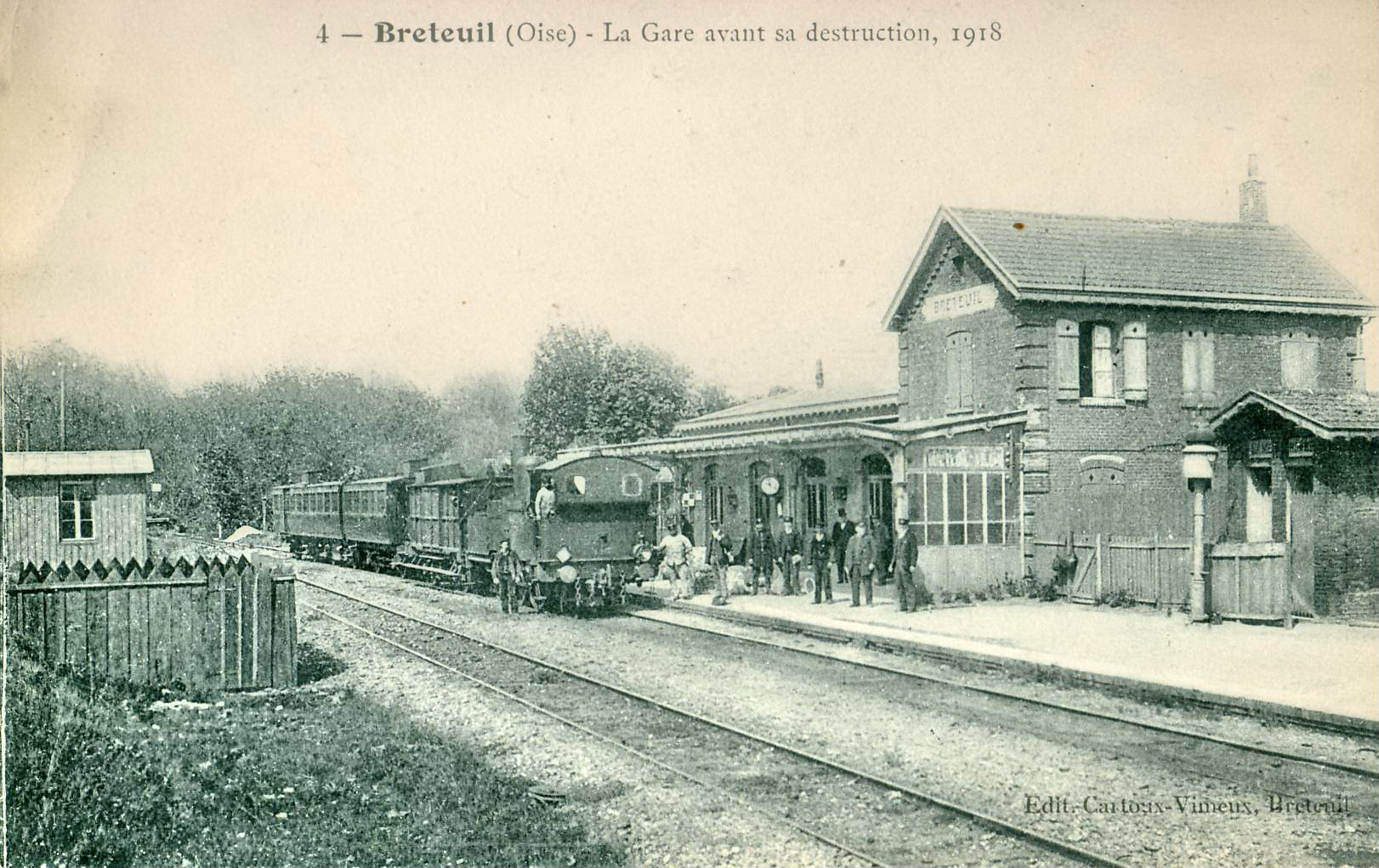
Early 20th-century view of Breteuil-Ville station, to which the branch line formerly went

== See also ==
- List of SNCF stations in Hauts-de-France
