= Wacquemoulin station =

Railway station in Wacquemoulin, France

Wacquemoulin

General information
- Location: Rue de la Gare; 60420 Wacquemoulin
- Coordinates: 49°30′11″N 2°36′43″E
- Owner: RFF/SNCF

Other information
- Station code: 87316208

Services
Preceding station	TER Hauts-de-France	Following station
Tricot towards Amiens	Proxi P23	Estrées-Saint-Denis towards Compiègne
Location

Wacquemoulin is a railway station located in the commune of Wacquemoulin in the Oise department, France. The station is served by TER Hauts-de-France trains (Amiens - Compiègne line).

== See also ==
- List of SNCF stations in Hauts-de-France
