= Estrées-Saint-Denis station =

French railway station

Estrées-Saint-Denis
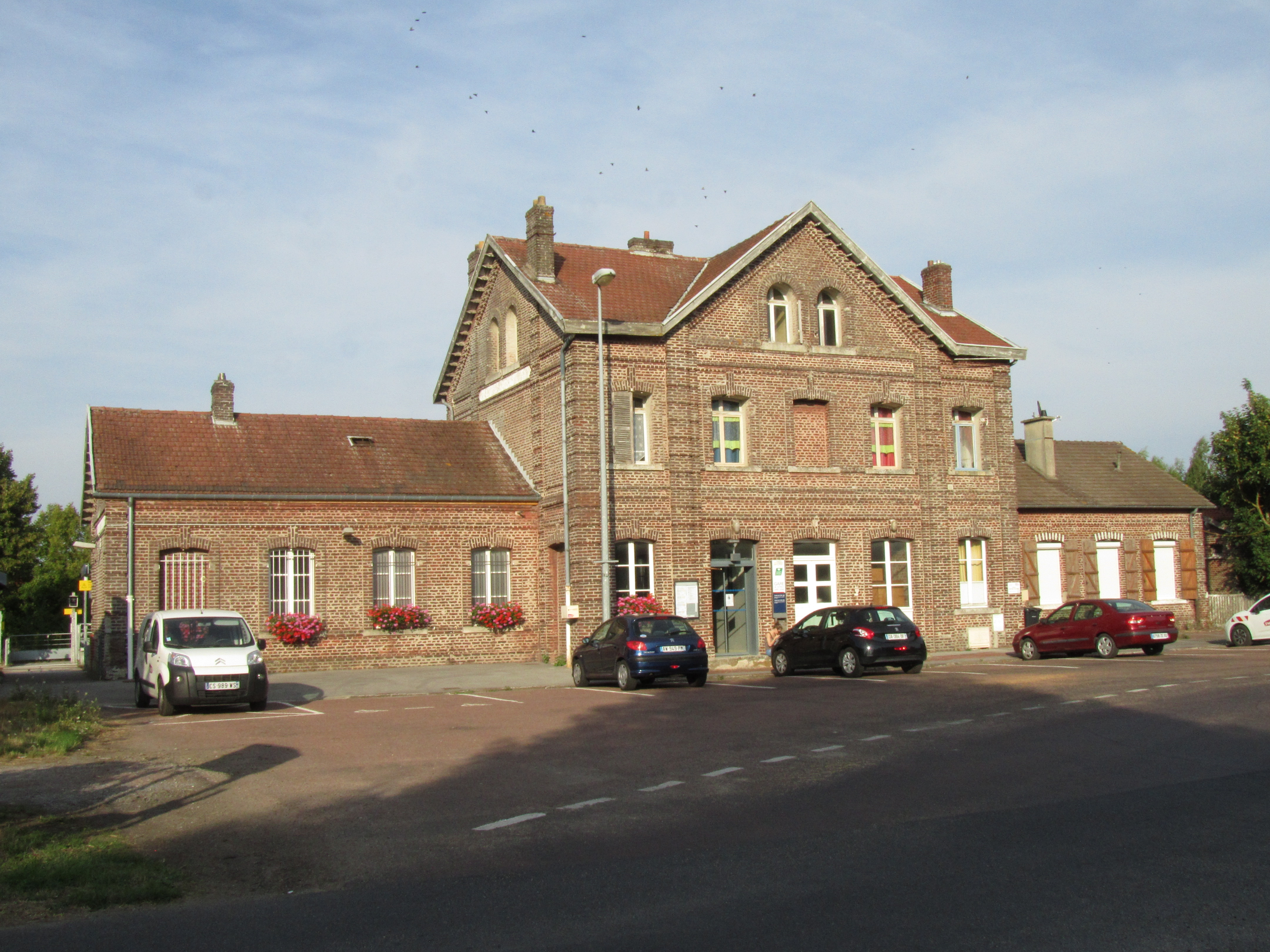
- Station forecourt

General information
- Location: Avenue de la Gare; 60190 Estrées-Saint-Denis
- Coordinates: 49°26′19″N 2°38′32″E
- Owner: RFF/SNCF
- Line: Amiens - Compiègne
- Platforms: 2
- Tracks: 2

Construction
- Accessible: yes

Other information
- Station code: 87313387

History
- Opened: 1880

Services
Preceding station	TER Hauts-de-France	Following station
Wacquemoulin towards Amiens	Proxi P23	Rémy towards Compiègne
Location

Estrées-Saint-Denis is a railway station in the commune of Estrées-Saint-Denis, Oise department, France. The station is served by TER Hauts-de-France trains (Amiens - Compiègne line).

== History ==
Estrées-Saint-Denis was previously a local railway centre, with connections to Clermont-de-l'Oise and to Ormoy-Villers. In addition to main-line services, it was the point of departure for the metre gauge secondary line operated by the Estrées-Saint-Denis - Froissy - Crèvecœur-le-Grand railway company, which linked the three towns via Saint-Just-en-Chaussée. In 1899, there were 26 passenger trains a day in 5 directions: Compiègne, Verberie, Saint-Just-en-Chaussée, Amiens and Clermont. The station had 80,000 passengers and 90,000 tonnes of goods traffic annually. Passenger traffic from the station on the secondary line ended in 1948.

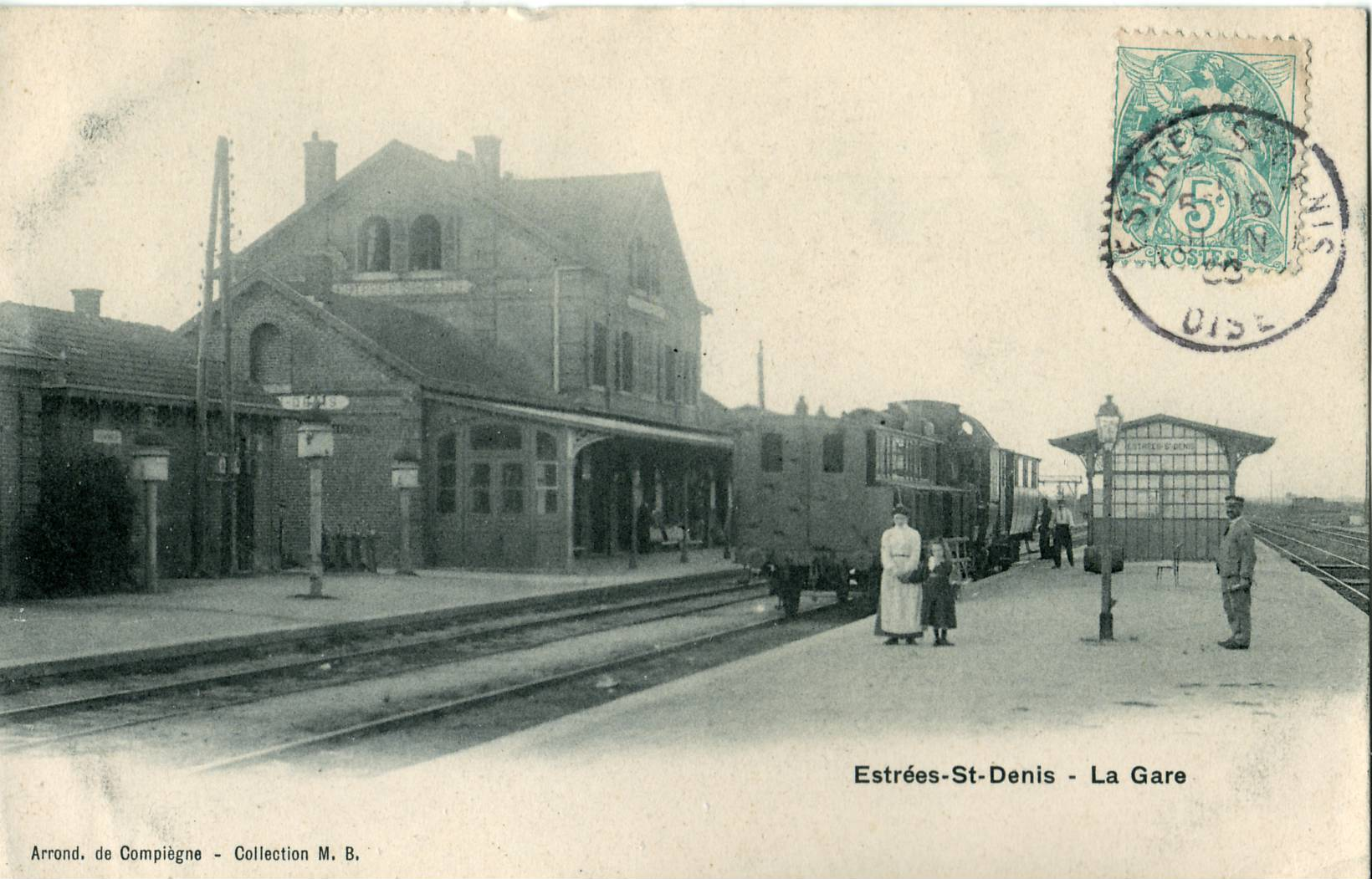
The station at the turn of the 20th century

The station was completely renovated in summer 2008 to simplify the layout of the tracks and to make it accessible to the handicapped.

== See also ==
- List of SNCF stations in Hauts-de-France
