= Woincourt station =

Former French railway station

Woincourt
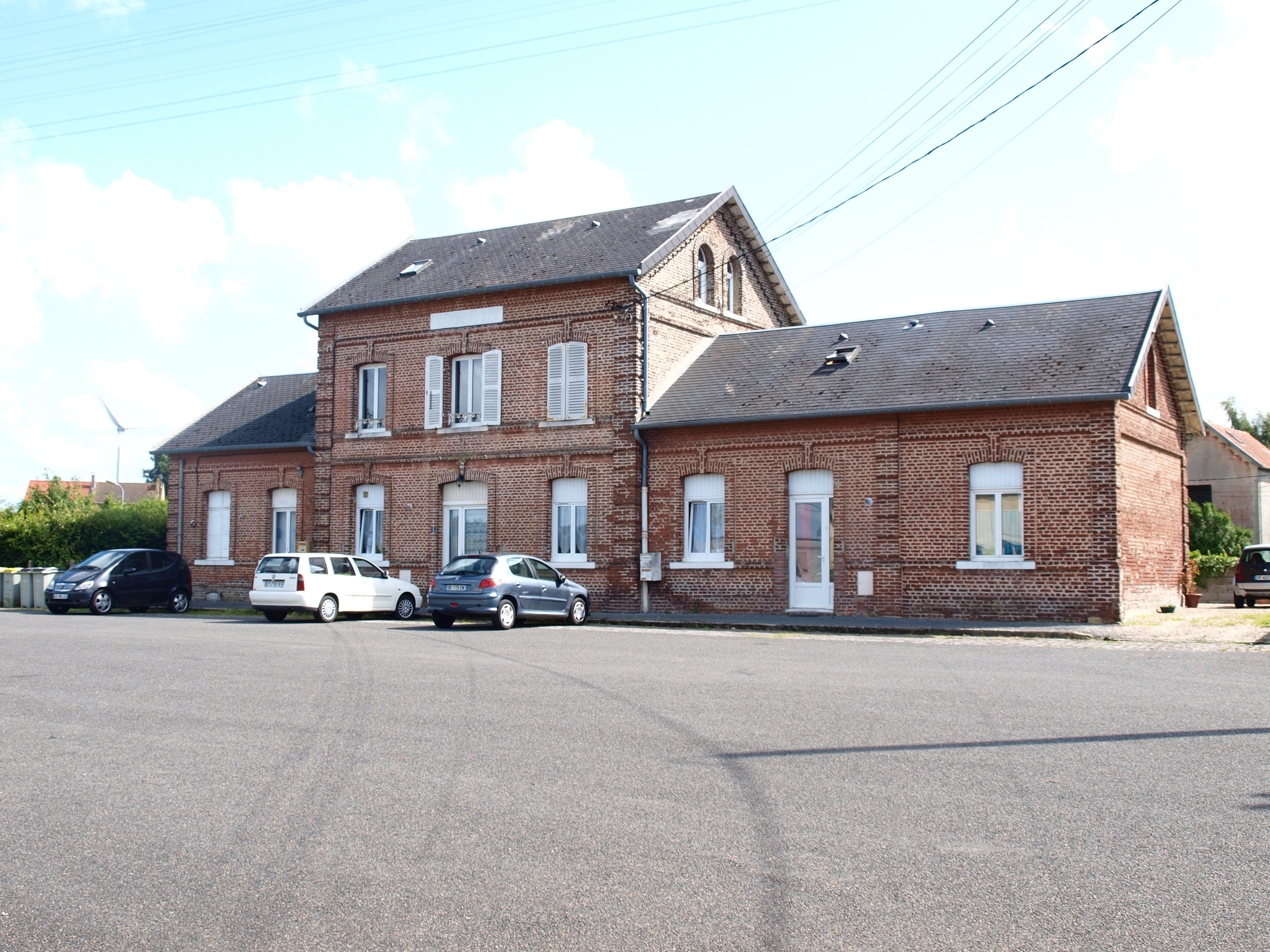
- Former station at Woincourt

General information
- Coordinates: 50°3′32″N 1°32′13″E
- Owner: SNCF
- Line: Abbeville-Eu railway
- Platforms: 2
- Tracks: 2

Other information
- Station code: 87317511

History
- Closed: 2018
Location

Woincourt is a former railway station located in the commune of Woincourt in the Somme department, France. The station was served by TER Hauts-de-France trains from Le Tréport-Mers to Abbeville. Train services were discontinued in 2018.

== See also ==
- List of SNCF stations in Hauts-de-France
