= Villers-sur-Thère station =

Railway station in Allonne, France

Villers-sur-Thère
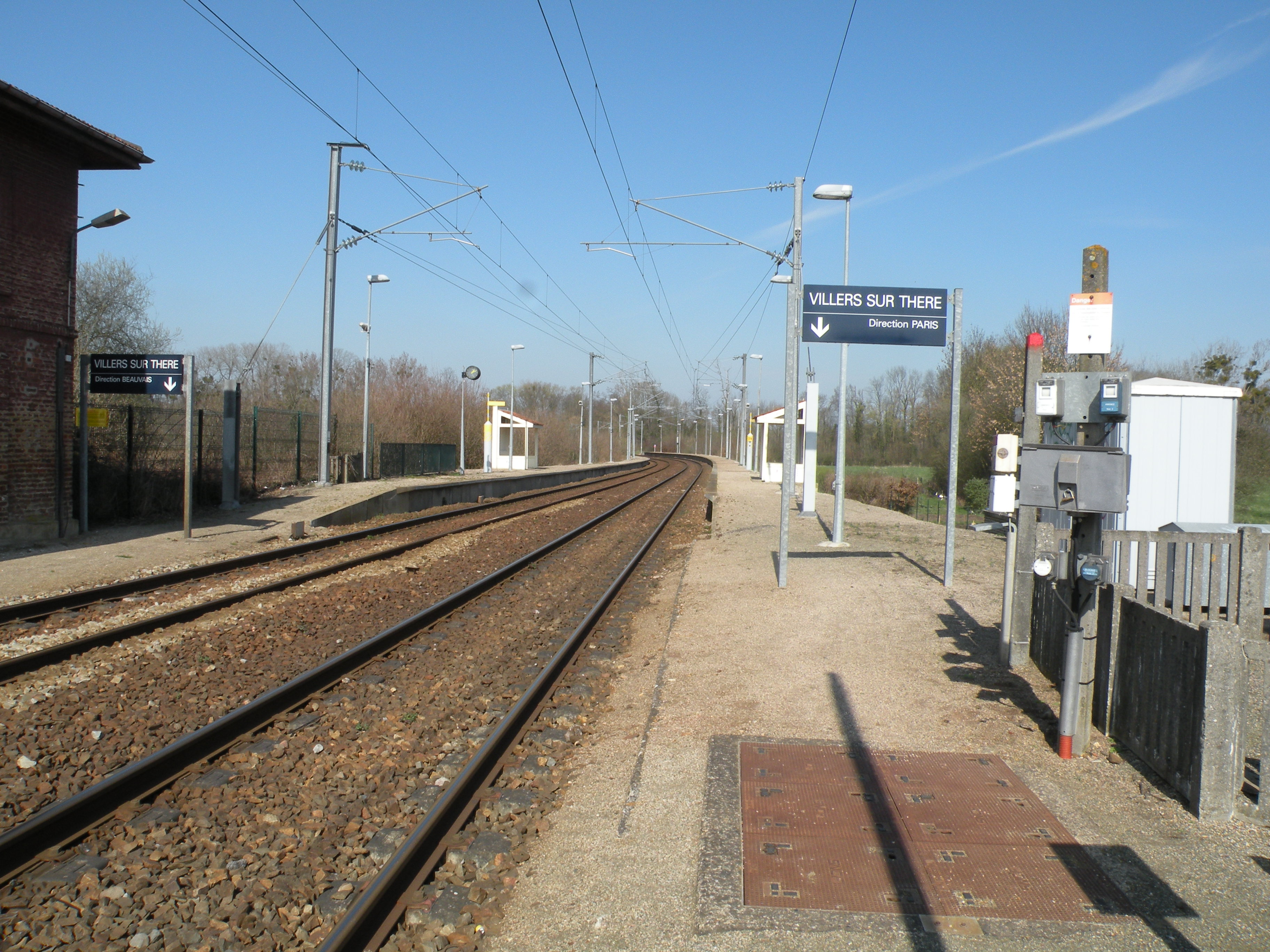
- Station platforms

General information
- Location: near Allonne, France
- Coordinates: 49.4139°N 2.1355°E
- Owner: SNCF
- Line: Épinay-Villetaneuse–Le Tréport-Mers railway

Other information
- Station code: 87316422
Location

Villers-sur-Thère is a former railway station located in the village Villers-sur-Thère near Allonne in the Oise department, France. It was served by TER Picardie trains from Paris-Nord to Beauvais. As of 2017, it is closed for passenger traffic.

== See also ==
- List of SNCF stations in Hauts-de-France
