= Chaulnes station =

French railway station

Chaulnes
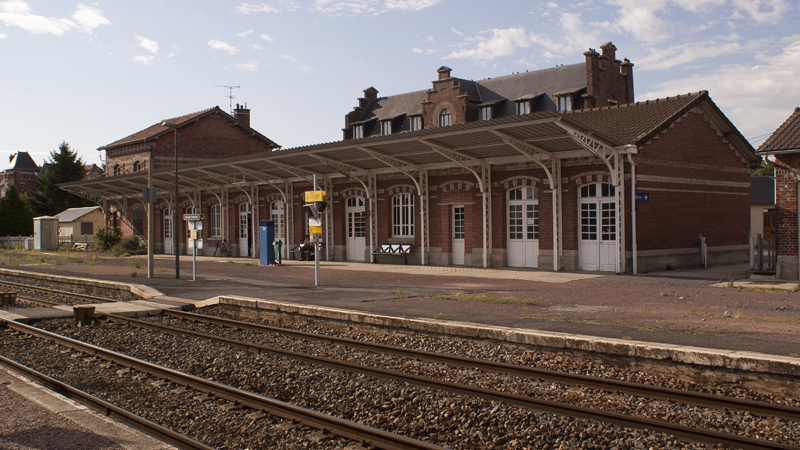
- The station with its platform in August 2009

General information
- Location: 2 Rte Hallu, 80320 Chaulnes
- Coordinates: 49°48′27″N 2°48′4″E
- Owner: RFF/SNCF
- Line: Amiens–Laon railway
- Platforms: 2
- Tracks: 3

Other information
- Station code: 87313478

History
- Opened: 1 June 1867

Services
Preceding station	TER Hauts-de-France	Following station
Rosières towards Amiens	Proxi P20	Nesle (Somme) towards Laon
Location

Chaulnes is a railway station located in the commune of Chaulnes in the Somme department, France. The station is served by TER Hauts-de-France trains from Amiens to Laon. Its elevation is 94 m.

== History ==
Formerly, the station was also connected to the railway line from Saint-Just-en-Chaussée to Cambrai via Montdidier, Chaulnes and Roisel, itself a diversionary route of the Paris-Nord–Lille line. The line was dismantled in stages between 1970 and the 2010s, including the sections on either side of Chaulnes, towards Roye and towards Péronne; only the Cambrai–Douai section remains in operation. Part of the former line has been replaced by bus services to Montdidier and Roisel.

== See also ==
- List of SNCF stations in Hauts-de-France
