= Clermont, Oise =

Clermont
- Subprefecture and commune
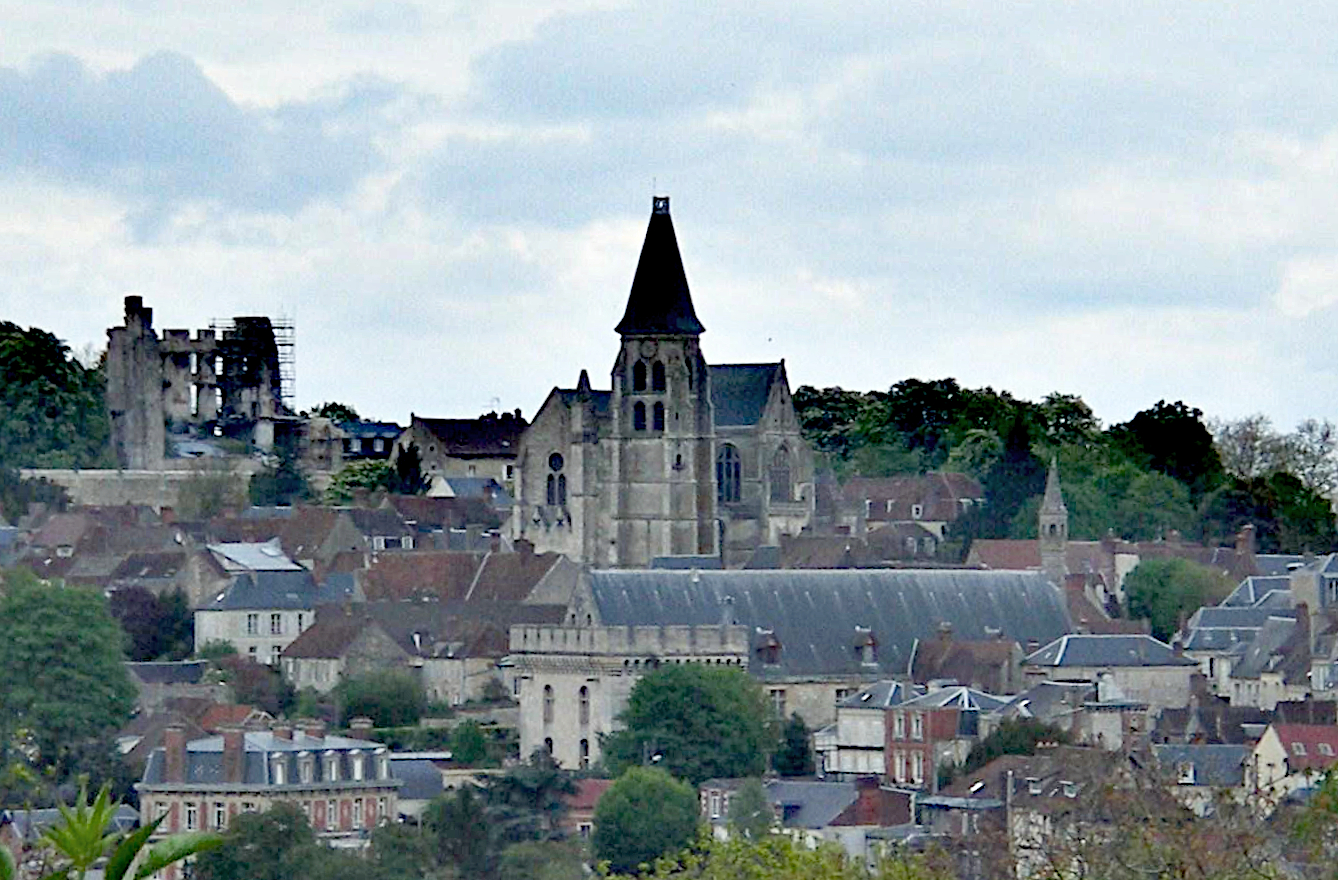
- The church and town centre in Clermont

- Coat of arms
- Location of Clermont
- Location within France Location within Hauts-de-France
- Coordinates: 49°22′47″N 2°24′48″E
- Country: France
- Region: Hauts-de-France
- Department: Oise
- Arrondissement: Clermont
- Canton: Clermont
- Intercommunality: Clermontois

Government
  - Mayor (2020–2026): Lionel Ollivier
- Area^{1}: 5.81 km^{2} (2.24 sq mi)
- Elevation: 54 m (177 ft)
- Highest elevation: 162 m (531 ft)
- Lowest elevation: 48 m (157 ft)
- Population (2023): 10,564
  - Density: 1,820/km^{2} (4,710/sq mi)
- Time zone: UTC+01:00 (CET)
  - Summer (DST): UTC+02:00 (CEST)
- INSEE/Postal code: 60157 /60600
- ^{1} French Land Register data, which excludes lakes, ponds, glaciers > 1 km^{2} (0.386 sq mi or 247 acres) and river estuaries.

Clermont (French pronunciation: [klɛʁmɔ̃]) is a commune in the Oise department in northern France. Clermont-de-l'Oise station has rail connections to Amiens, Creil, and Paris.

== History ==
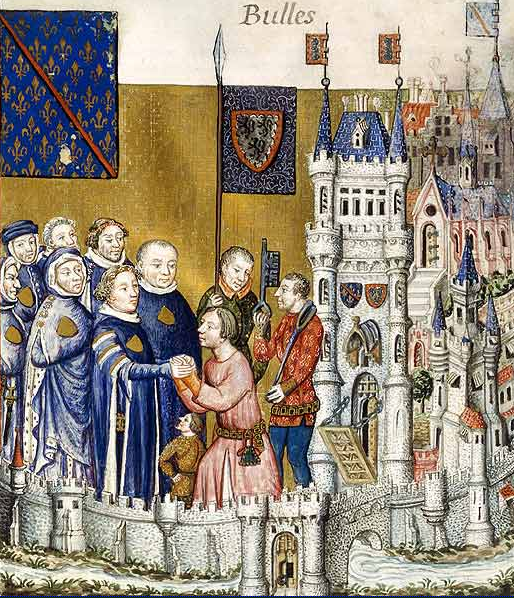
Homage of Clermont-en-Beauvaisis

Clermont was also known as Clermont-en-Beauvaisis or Clermont-de-l'Oise. The town is built on a hill surmounted by a 14th-century keep. It is the relic of a medieval fortress that was later used as a penitentiary for women. The church dates from the 14th to the 16th centuries. The hôtel-de-ville, built by King Charles IV, who was born in Clermont in 1294, is the oldest in the north of France.

The town was probably founded around the time of the Viking invasions of France in the 9th century, as an important military outpost. The counts of Clermont-en-Beauvaisis first appeared in the early 11th century. King Philip II of France bought the county in 1218 and added it to the French crown. It was first granted as an appanage in 1218 to Philip Hurepel. With the extinction of his line, it was granted in 1268 to the House of Bourbon and was confiscated with the Duchy of Bourbon in 1527. It was repeatedly taken and retaken by the contending parties during the Hundred Years' War, and the Wars of Religion, In 1615, Henry II, prince of Condé, was besieged and captured there by the marshal d’Ancre.

== Population ==
Historical population
Year	Pop.	±% p.a.
1968	8,437	—
1975	8,576	+0.23%
1982	8,628	+0.09%
1990	8,934	+0.44%
1999	9,699	+0.92%
2007	10,612	+1.13%
2012	10,862	+0.47%
2017	10,147	−1.35%
2023	10,564	+0.67%
Source: INSEE

== Sights ==
- Church St Samson (12th, 14th and 16th centuries), containing numerous paintings from the seventeenth century
- Dungeon of Clermont, 12th century
- Fortified town hall, 14th century
- Subprefecture of Clermont, 15th century
- Lardieres chapel, 17th century
- Chatellier Park

== International relations ==
It is twinned with:

- Sudbury, United Kingdom
- Chiaramonte Gulfi, Italy

== See also ==
- Communes of the Oise department
- List of counts of Clermont-en-Beauvaisis
