= Bacouël =

- Commune
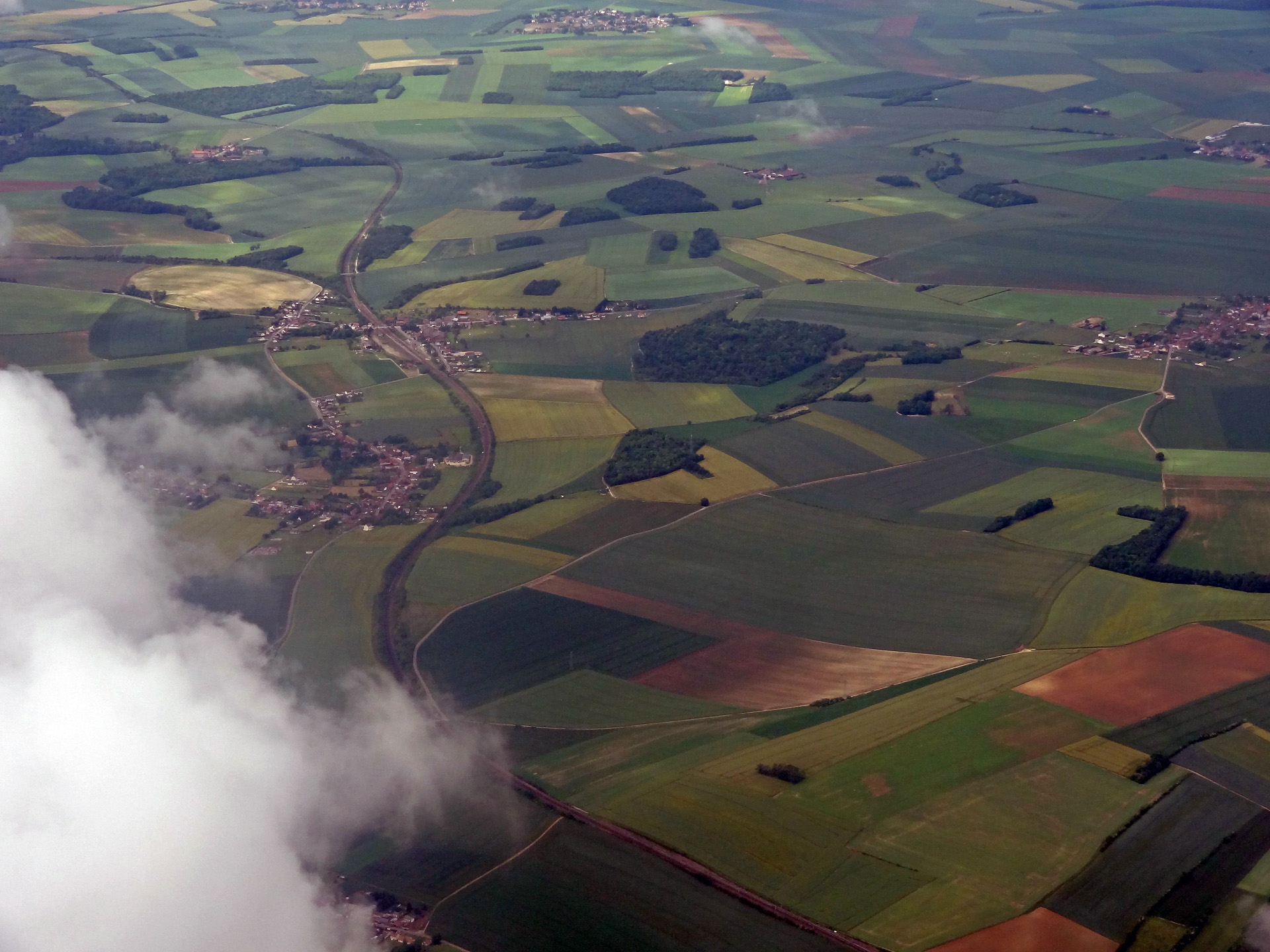
- An aerial view of Bacouël and Breteuil-Embranchement railway station
- Location of Bacouël
- Location within France Location within Hauts-de-France
- Coordinates: 49°37′10″N 2°23′12″E
- Country: France
- Region: Hauts-de-France
- Department: Oise
- Arrondissement: Clermont
- Canton: Saint-Just-en-Chaussée
- Intercommunality: Oise Picarde

Government
  - Mayor (2023–2026): Dominique Cordelle
- Area^{1}: 5.48 km^{2} (2.12 sq mi)
- Highest elevation: 149 m (489 ft)
- Lowest elevation: 81 m (266 ft)
- Population (2023): 477
  - Density: 87.0/km^{2} (225/sq mi)
- Time zone: UTC+01:00 (CET)
  - Summer (DST): UTC+02:00 (CEST)
- INSEE/Postal code: 60039 /60120
- ^{1} French Land Register data, which excludes lakes, ponds, glaciers > 1 km^{2} (0.386 sq mi or 247 acres) and river estuaries.

Bacouël (French pronunciation: [bakwɛl]) is a commune in the Oise department in northern France. Breteuil-Embranchement station has rail connections to Amiens, Creil and Paris.

== Population ==
Historical population
Year	Pop.	±% p.a.
1968	456	—
1975	351	−3.67%
1982	323	−1.18%
1990	359	+1.33%
1999	387	+0.84%
2007	463	+2.27%
2012	462	−0.04%
2017	492	+1.27%
2023	477	−0.51%
Source: INSEE

== See also ==
- Communes of the Oise department
