= Estrées-Saint-Denis =

- Commune
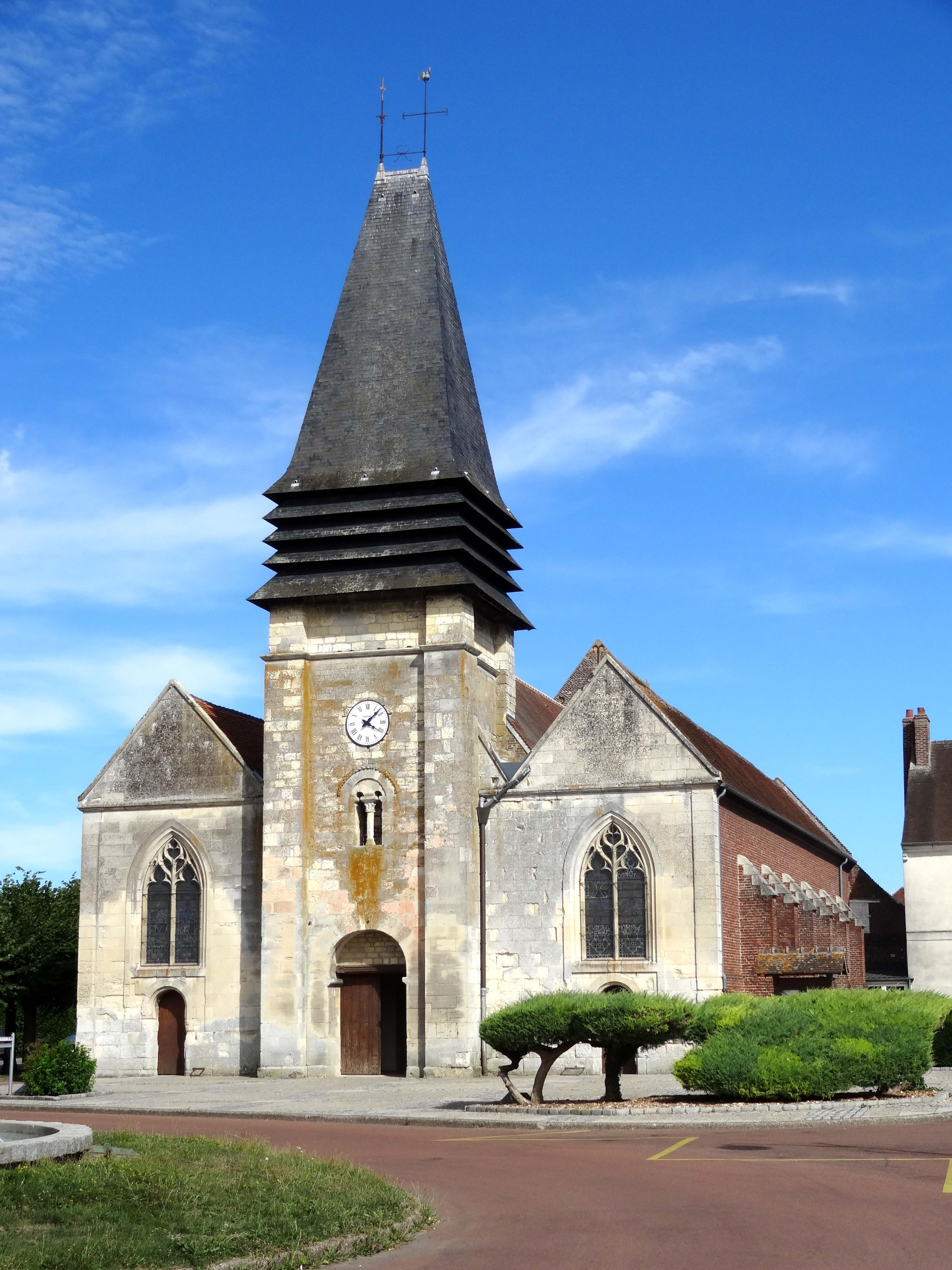
- The church in Estrées-Saint-Denis

- Coat of arms
- Location of Estrées-Saint-Denis
- Location within France Location within Hauts-de-France
- Coordinates: 49°25′35″N 2°38′37″E
- Country: France
- Region: Hauts-de-France
- Department: Oise
- Arrondissement: Compiègne
- Canton: Estrées-Saint-Denis
- Intercommunality: Plaine d'Estrées

Government
  - Mayor (2020–2026): Myriane Rousset
- Area^{1}: 8.08 km^{2} (3.12 sq mi)
- Elevation: 70 m (230 ft)
- Highest elevation: 118 m (387 ft)
- Lowest elevation: 69 m (226 ft)
- Population (2023): 3,664
  - Density: 453/km^{2} (1,170/sq mi)
- Time zone: UTC+01:00 (CET)
  - Summer (DST): UTC+02:00 (CEST)
- INSEE/Postal code: 60223 /60190
- ^{1} French Land Register data, which excludes lakes, ponds, glaciers > 1 km^{2} (0.386 sq mi or 247 acres) and river estuaries.

Estrées-Saint-Denis (French pronunciation: [ɛstʁe sɛ̃ dəni]) is a commune in the Oise department in northern France. Estrées-Saint-Denis station has rail connections to Amiens and Compiègne.

It is one of many villages in the north of France bearing the name Estrées. The etymology of the name is from strata (cognate of English "street"), the word for the stone-layered Roman roads in the area (some of which turned into modern highways). Hence Estreti, "village on the road" which developed into "Estrées".

== Population ==
Historical population
Year	Pop.	±% p.a.
1968	1,678	—
1975	2,488	+5.79%
1982	3,486	+4.94%
1990	3,501	+0.05%
1999	3,542	+0.13%
2007	3,559	+0.06%
2012	3,604	+0.25%
2017	3,752	+0.81%
2023	3,664	−0.39%
Source: INSEE

== See also ==
- Communes of the Oise department
