= Clermont-de-l'Oise station =

French railway station

Clermont-de-l'Oise
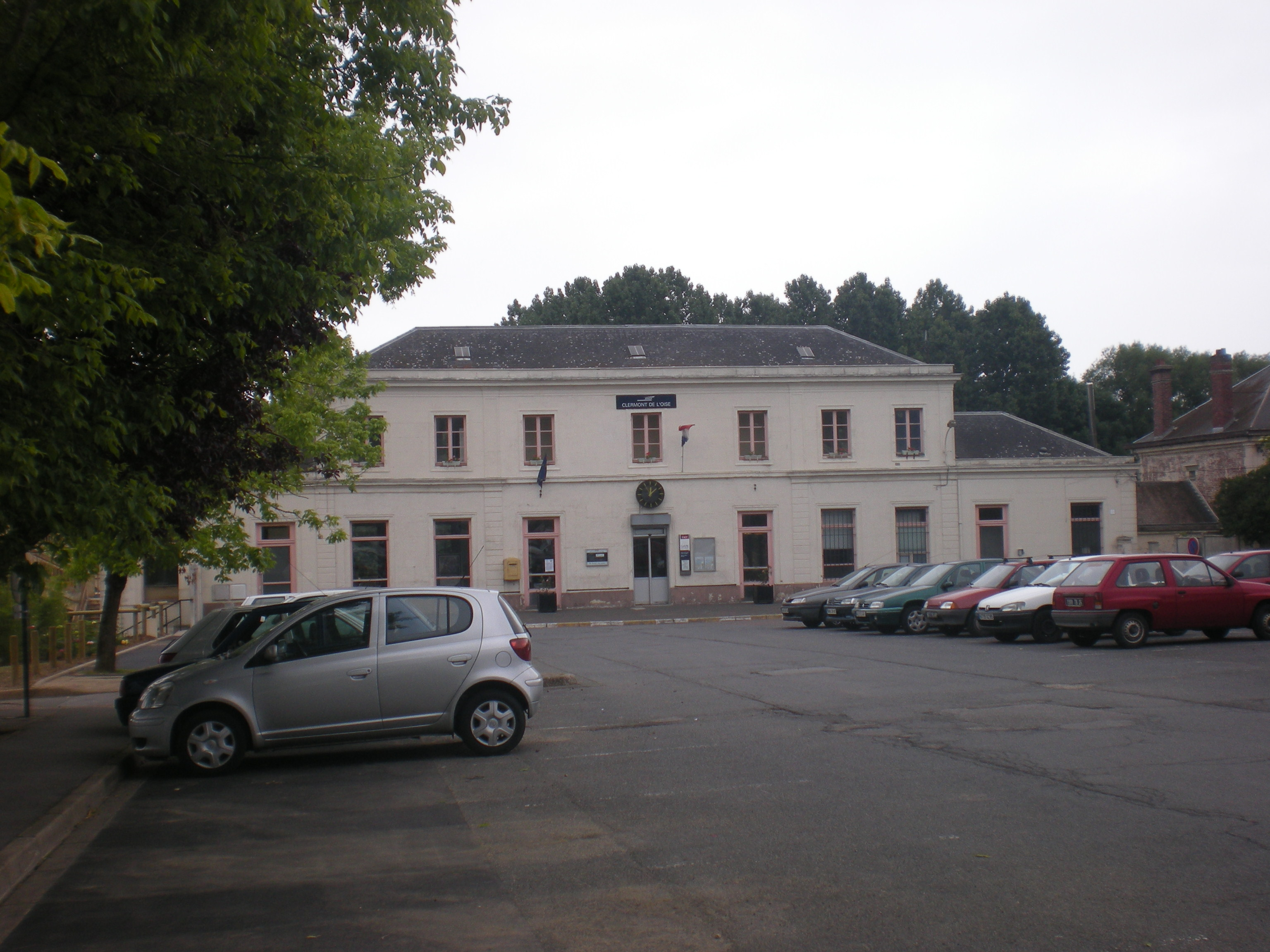
- Front of station building

General information
- Location: Place de la Gare, 60600 Clermont-de-l'Oise
- Coordinates: 49°23′07″N 2°25′05″E
- Owner: RFF/SNCF
- Line: Paris–Lille railway
- Platforms: 2
- Tracks: 7

Construction
- Parking: 320

Other information
- Station code: 87313304

History
- Opened: 1846

Passengers
- 2024: 1,155,397

Services
| Preceding station | TER Hauts-de-France | Following station |
|---|---|---|
| Saint-Just-en-Chaussée towards Amiens | Krono K10 | Creil towards Paris-Nord |
| Saint-Just-en-Chaussée towards Amiens | Citi C10 | Liancourt–Rantigny towards Paris-Nord |
| Avrechy towards Amiens | Proxi P10 | Liancourt–Rantigny towards Creil |
Location

Clermont-de-l'Oise is a railway station located in the town of Clermont in the Oise department in northern France. The station is situated on the Paris–Lille railway. The station is staffed on weekdays and is equipped with an automatic ticket dispenser. There are two free paved car parks, with 120 and 200 spaces respectively. Both are underequipped and undersized; renovating them would require charging for parking.

== Transport connections ==
Connections are available to intercity buses, but little service to surrounding communes is planned and there are too few seats with respect to the number of passengers commuting to Paris.

== History ==
The station opened in 1846 when the first Paris - Clermont and then Paris - Amiens rail connections were established. It was one of the first stations to be opened on the line. Clermont was formerly connected to Beauvais via La Rue-Saint-Pierre and Rochy-Condé and to Estrées-Saint-Denis.

== Services ==
The station is served by regional trains to Paris, Creil and Amiens.

== See also ==
- List of SNCF stations in Hauts-de-France
