= List of SNCF stations in Hauts-de-France =

This article contains a list of current SNCF railway stations in the Hauts-de-France region of France.

== Aisne (02) ==
- Aguilcourt—Variscourt
- Amifontaine
- Anizy-Pinon
- Barenton-Bugny
- Bazoches
- Bohain
- La Bouteille
- Château-Thierry
- Chauny
- Chézy-sur-Marne
- Clacy-Mons
- Corcy
- Coucy-lès-Eppes
- Crépy-Couvron
- Crouy
- Dercy-Froidmont
- La Fère
- La Ferté-Milon
- Flavy-le-Martel
- Fresnoy-le-Grand
- Guignicourt
- Hirson
- Hirson-Écoles
- Laon
- Longpont
- Margival
- Marle-sur-Serre
- Mennessis
- Montescourt
- Nogent-l'Artaud-Charly
- Origny-en-Thiérache
- Saint-Erme
- Saint-Quentin
- Soissons
- Tergnier
- Vaumoise
- Vauxaillon
- Verneuil-sur-Serre
- Versigny
- Vervins
- Vierzy
- Villers-Cotterêts
- Viry-Noureuil
- Voyenne

== Nord (59) ==
- Annappes
- Anor
- Arleux
- Armentiéres
- Arnèke
- Ascq
- Aubigny-au-Bac
- Aulnoye-Aymeries
- Avesnelles
- Avesnes-sur-Helpe
- Bailleul
- Baisieux
- La Bassée-Violaines
- Bauvin-Provin
- Bergues
- Berlaimont
- Bertry
- Beuvrages
- Les Bons-Pères
- Bouchain
- Bourbourg
- Brunémont
- Busigny
- Cambrai-Annexe
- Cambrai
- Cantin
- Cassel
- Le Cateau
- Cattenières
- Caudry
- Coudekerque-Branche
- Croix-l'Allumette
- Croix-Wasquehal
- Denain
- Dompierre
- Don-Sainghin
- Douai
- Dunkerque
- Ebblinghem
- Ennevelin
- Escaudœuvres
- Esquelbecq
- La Fontaine
- Fourmies
- Fretin
- Grande-Synthe
- Gravelines
- Hachette
- Haubourdin
- Hautmont
- Hazebrouck
- Hellemmes
- Iwuy
- Jeumont
- Landas
- Landrecies
- Lesquin
- Leval
- Lezennes
- Lille-CHR
- Lille-Europe
- Lille-Flandres
- Lille-Porte-de-Douai
- Loos
- Lourches
- Louvroil
- La Madeleine
- Marquillies
- Maubeuge
- Maurois
- Mont-de-Terre
- Montigny-en-Ostrevent
- Nieppe
- Nomain
- Orchies
- Ors
- Ostricourt
- Pérenchies
- Phalempin
- Le Poirier-Université
- Pont-de-Bois
- Pont-de-la-Deule
- Prouvy-Thiant
- Le Quesnoy
- Raismes
- Recquignies
- Renescure
- Ronchin
- Rosult
- Roubaix
- Sains-du-Nord
- Saint-Amand-les-Eaux
- Saint-André
- Saint-Hilaire
- Salomé
- Santes
- Seclin
- Sin-le-Noble
- Somain
- Sous-le-Bois
- Steenbecque
- Steenwerck
- Strazeele
- Templeuve
- Thiennes
- Tourcoing
- Trith-Saint-Léger
- Valenciennes
- Wallers
- Wambaix
- Wattignies-Templemars
- Wavrin

== Oise (60) ==
- Abancourt
- Appilly
- Avrechy
- Balagny-Saint-Épin
- Beauvais
- Boran-sur-Oise
- Bornel—Belle-Église
- Breteuil
- Breteuil-Embranchement
- Chambly
- Chantilly-Gouvieux
- Chaumont-au-Vexin
- Chevrières
- Choisy-au-Bac
- Cires-lès-Mello
- Clermont-de-l'Oise
- Compiègne
- Cramoisy
- Creil
- Crépy-en-Valois
- Esches
- Estrées-Saint-Denis
- Feuquières-Broquiers
- Formerie
- Fouilloy
- Gannes
- Grandvilliers
- Heilles-Mouchy
- Herchies
- Hermes-Berthecourt
- Jaux
- Laboissière-Le Déluge
- Laigneville
- Lavilletertre
- Liancourt-Saint-Pierre
- Liancourt-Rantigny
- Longueil-Annel
- Longueil-Sainte-Marie
- Mareuil-sur-Ourcq
- Marseille-en-Beauvaisis
- Méru
- Meux
- Milly-sur-Thérain
- Montataire
- Montreuil-sur-Thérain
- Mouy-Bury
- Nanteuil-le-Haudouin
- Noyon
- Ormoy-Villers
- Orry-la-Ville-Coye
- Ourscamps
- Le Plessis-Belleville
- Pont-l'Évêque-sur-Oise
- Pont-Sainte-Maxence
- Précy-sur-Oise
- Rémy
- Ribécourt
- Rieux-Angicourt
- Rochy-Condé
- Saint-Just-en-Chaussée
- Saint-Leu-d'Esserent
- Saint-Omer-en-Chaussée
- Saint-Rémy-en-l'Eau
- Saint-Sulpice-Auteuil
- Sérifontaine
- Thourotte
- Tricot
- Trie-Château
- Villers-Saint-Paul
- Villers-Saint-Sépulcre
- Wacquemoulin

== Pas-de-Calais (62) ==
- Achiet
- Anvin
- Arras
- Aubigny-en-Artois
- Aubin-Saint-Vaast
- Auchy-lès-Hesdin
- Audruicq
- Avion
- Bailleul-Sir-Berthoult
- Beau-Marais
- Beaurainville
- Béthune
- Beuvry
- Biache-Saint-Vaast
- Billy-Montigny
- Blangy-sur-Ternoise
- Boisleux
- Boulogne-Tintelleries
- Boulogne-Ville
- Brebières-Sud
- Brimeux
- Bully-Grenay
- Caffiers
- Calais-Fréthun
- Calais-Ville
- Calonne-Ricouart
- Chocques
- Corbehem
- Coron-de-Méricourt
- Courcelles-le-Comte
- Cuinchy
- Dannes-Camiers
- Dourges
- Étaples-Le Touquet
- Farbus
- Les Fontinettes
- Fouqereuil
- Frévin-Capelle
- Ham-en-Artois
- Le Haut-Banc
- Hénin-Beaumont
- Hesdigneul
- Hesdin
- Isbergues
- Leforest
- Lens
- Libercourt
- Liévin
- Lillers
- Loison-sous-Lens
- Loos-en-Gohelle
- Maresquel
- Marœuil
- Marquillies
- Marquise-Rinxent
- Mazingarbe
- Meurchin
- Montreuil-sur-Mer
- Neufchätel-Hardelot
- Nœux-les-Mines
- Nortkerque
- Pernes-Camblain
- Pihen
- Pont-à-Vendin
- Pont-d'Ardres
- Pont-de-Briques
- Pont-de-Sallaumines
- Rang-du-Fliers
- Rœux
- Ruminghem
- Saint-Omer
- Saint-Pol-sur-Ternoise
- Sallaumines
- Savy-Berlette
- Tincques
- Vimy
- Vis-à-Marles
- Vitry-en-Artois
- Watten-Éperlecques
- Wimille-Wimereux

== Somme (80) ==
- Abbeville
- Ailly-sur-Noye
- Ailly-sur-Somme
- Albert
- Amiens
- Boves
- Buire-sur-l'Ancre
- Chaulnes
- Corbie
- Daours
- Dommartin-Remiencourt
- Dreuil-lès-Amiens
- La Faloise
- Ham (Somme)
- Hangest
- Hargicourt—Pierrepont
- TGV Haute-Picardie
- Heilly
- Longpré-les-Corps-Saints
- Longueau
- Marcelcave
- Méricourt-Ribémont
- Miraumont
- Montdidier
- Moreuil
- Namps-Quevauvillers
- Nesle (Somme)
- Noyelles
- Picquigny
- Poix-de-Picardie
- Pont-Remy
- Rosières
- Rue
- Saint-Roch (Somme)
- Thézy-Glimont
- Villers-Bretonneux

== See also ==
- SNCF
- List of SNCF stations for SNCF stations in other regions
