= Longueau station =

Railway station in Longueau, France

Coordinates: 49°51′51″N 2°21′10″E

Longueau
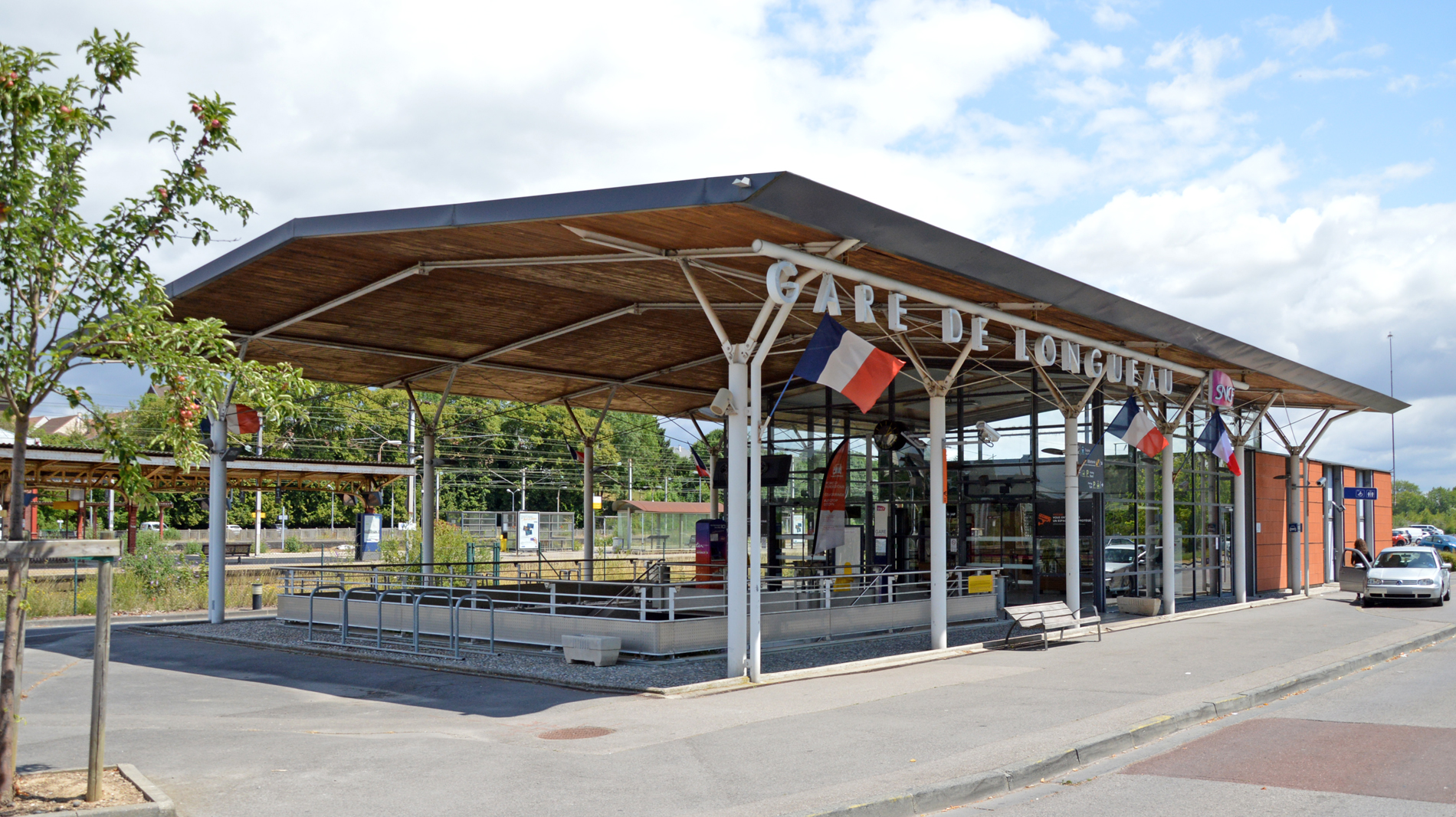
- SNCF passenger building and entrance to the station.

General information
- Location: Route de Boves; 80330 Longueau
- Owner: SNCF
- Operator: SNCF

Services
Preceding station	TER Hauts-de-France	Following station
Amiens Terminus	Krono K10	Saint-Just-en-Chaussée towards Paris-Nord
Creil towards Paris-Nord	Krono K12	Arras towards Lille-Flandres
Paris-Nord Terminus	Krono K16	Amiens towards Calais
Amiens Terminus	Citi C10	Ailly-sur-Noye towards Paris-Nord
Amiens Terminus	Proxi P10	Boves towards Creil
Amiens Terminus	Proxi P23	Boves towards Compiègne
Location

Longueau station (French: Gare de Longueau) is a railway station in Longueau near Amiens, France. It is situated on the Paris–Lille railway. Longueau is served by trains of the TER Hauts-de-France network. As well as serving as a passenger station, Longueau is also home to one of the North of France's largest engine sheds, which include a roundhouse and turntable.

Longueau is linked to the region's large cities; Lille, Amiens, Compiègne, Calais and Paris.

== See also ==
- List of SNCF stations in Hauts-de-France
