= Saint-Just-en-Chaussée station =

French railway station

Coordinates: 49°30′13″N 2°25′44″E

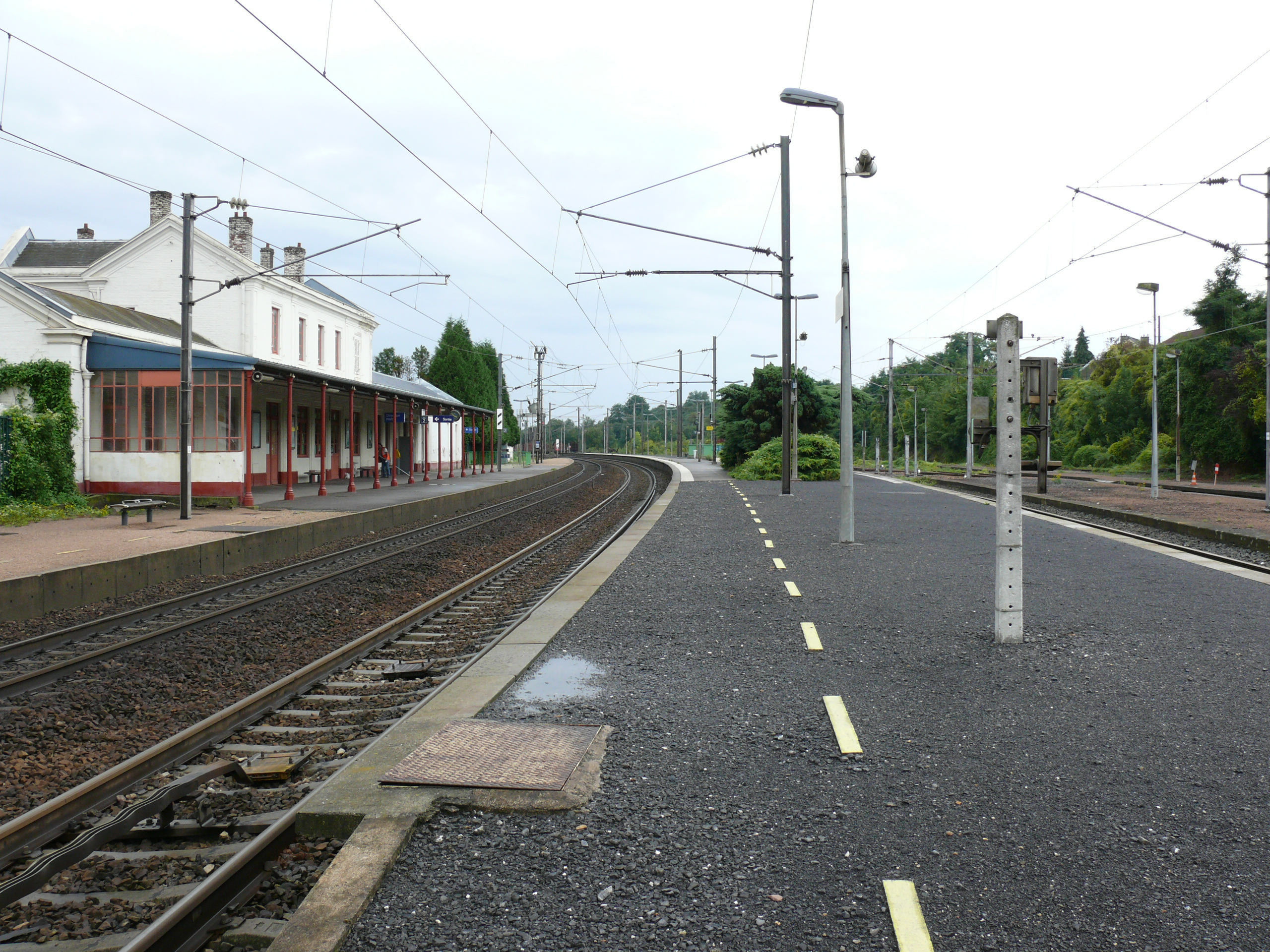
Saint-Just-en-Chaussée station

Saint-Just-en-Chaussée is a railway station serving the town Saint-Just-en-Chaussée, Oise department, northern France. It is situated on the Paris–Lille railway.

The station is served by regional trains to Paris, Creil and Amiens.

Preceding station	TER Hauts-de-France	Following station
Longueau towards Amiens	Krono K10	Clermont-de-l'Oise towards Paris-Nord
Breteuil-Embranchement towards Amiens	Citi C10	Clermont-de-l'Oise towards Paris-Nord
Gannes towards Amiens	Proxi P10	Saint-Rémy-en-l'Eau towards Creil
