= TER Hauts-de-France =

French regional rail network

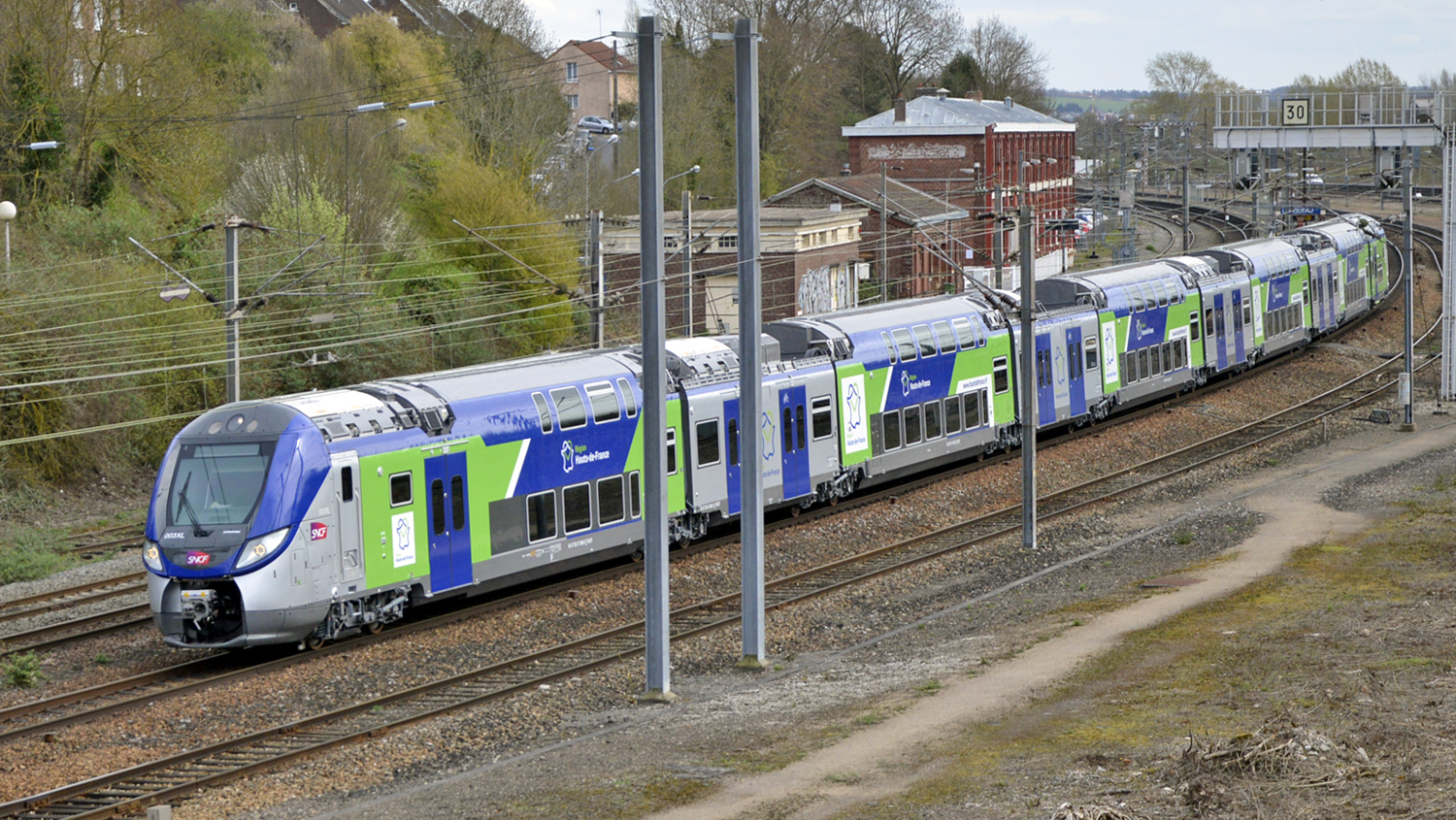
- A Regio 2N near Longueau station.

Overview
- Service type: Regional express
- Locale: Hauts-de-France
- Predecessor: TER Picardie, TER Nord-Pas-de-Calais
- First service: 2017
- Current operator: SNCF Voyageurs
- Ridership: 230,000 / day (2024)
- Website: TER Hauts-de-France

Route
- Stops: 349

Technical
- Track gauge: 1,435 mm (4 ft 8 1/2 in)

TER Hauts-de-France is the regional rail network serving the French administrative region of Hauts-de-France in northern France. It is owned and operated by the French national railway company SNCF. It was formed in 2017 from the previous TER networks TER Nord-Pas-de-Calais and TER Picardie, after the respective administrative regions were merged.

== Network ==
Four types of services are distinguished by TER Hauts-de-France:

- Krono+ GV: fast connections, including high speed lines
- Krono: fast connections between cities
- Citi: frequent suburban services
- Proxi: local services
  - To which summer seasonal (saisonnières) services are added, under the auspices of "éTER" operations.

The rail and bus network as of December 2025:

=== Rail ===
Rail transport infrastructure map of Hauts-de-France, showing main stations, number of tracks, power source and maximum speed.

Krono+ GV	Route
K90+	Amiens - Arras - Lille-Europe - Dunkerque
K92+	Amiens - Arras - Lille-Europe - Calais-Fréthun
K94+	Amiens - Arras - Lille-Europe - Calais-Fréthun - Boulogne - Étaples-Le Touquet - Rang-du-Fliers
Krono	Route
K10/K11	Paris-Nord – Creil – Clermont-de-l'Oise – Saint-Just-en-Chaussée – Longueau - Amiens
K12	Paris-Nord – Creil – Longueau - Arras - Douai - Lille-Flandres
K13	Paris-Nord – Compiègne – Saint-Quentin - Busigny - Caudry - Cambrai branch line: Busigny - Le Cateau - Aulnoye-Aymeries - Maubeuge
K14	Paris-Nord – Creil – Pont-Sainte-Maxence – Compiègne – Noyon – Chauny – Tergnier – Saint-Quentin
K15	Paris-Nord – Dammartin-Juilly-Saint-Mard – Crépy-en-Valois – Villers-Cotterêts – Soissons – Anizy-Pinon – Laon
K16	Paris-Nord – Longueau - Amiens - Abbeville - Noyelles-sur-Mer - Rue - Rang-du-Fliers - Étaples-Le Touquet - Boulogne - Calais-Ville
K20	Amiens - Ham (Somme) - Saint-Quentin
K21	Amiens - Saint-Roch - Abbeville - Noyelles-sur-Mer - Rue - Rang-du-Fliers - Étaples-Le Touquet - Boulogne-Ville ... Calais-Ville
K40	Lille-Flandres – Douai – Montigny-en-Ostrevent - Somain - Cambrai - Caudry - Busigny - Saint-Quentin
K43	Arras – Douai - Valenciennes
K44/K45	Lille-Flandres - Douai - Arras – Albert – Corbie - Amiens - Saint-Roch - Poix-de-Picardie - Abancourt - Serqueux ... Rouen-Rive-Droite
K50	Lille-Flandres – Lille-CHR - La Bassée - Béthune ... Saint-Pol-sur-Ternoise
K51	Lille-Flandres – Lille-CHR - Don-Sainghin - Bauvin-Provin - Pont-à-Vendin - Lens
K52	Arras – Avion - Lens ... Béthune ... Hazebrouck ... Dunkerque
K60	Lille-Flandres – Orchies - Saint-Amand-les-Eaux - Valenciennes ... Aulnoye-Aymeries - Maubeuge - Jeumont
K61	Lille-Flandres – Orchies - Saint-Amand-les-Eaux - Valenciennes ... Aulnoye-Aymeries ... Hirson - Liart - Charleville-Mézières
K70	Lille-Flandres – Armentières - Bailleul - Hazebrouck ... Dunkerque
K71	Lille-Flandres – Armentières - Bailleul - Hazebrouck - Saint-Omer ... Calais-Ville
K80	Lille-Flandres – Roubaix – Tourcoing ... (Belgium) Kortrijk
K81	Aulnoye-Aymeries - (Belgium) Mons
K82	Maubeuge - (Belgium) Charleroi-Central - (Belgium) Namur
Citi	Route
C10/C11	Paris-Nord – Orry-la-Ville-Coye – Chantilly-Gouvieux – Creil - Laigneville - Liancourt-Rantigny – Clermont-de-l'Oise – Saint-Just-en-Chaussée – Breteuil-Embranchement – Ailly-sur-Noye – Longueau - Amiens
C13/C14	Paris-Nord – Orry-la-Ville-Coye – Chantilly-Gouvieux – Creil – Villers-Saint-Paul - Rieux-Angicourt – Pont-Sainte-Maxence - Chevrières - Longueil-Sainte-Marie - Le Meux-Lacroix-Saint-Ouen - Jaux - Compiègne
C17	Beauvais – Saint-Sulpice-Auteuil – Laboissière-Le Déluge – Méru – Esches – Bornel—Belle-Église – Chambly – Persan–Beaumont – Paris-Nord
C40	Lille-Flandres ... Douai
C41	Lille-Flandres ... Libercourt ... Lens
C50	Lille-Flandres ... Don-Sainghin ... Béthune
C51	Lille-Flandres ... Don-Sainghin ... Lens
C60	Lille-Flandres ... Orchies ... Saint-Amand-les-Eaux – Valenciennes
C70	Lille-Flandres ... Armentières ... Bailleul ... Hazebrouck
Proxi	Route
P10	Creil – Laigneville – Liancourt-Rantigny – Clermont-de-l'Oise – Avrechy – Saint-Remy-en-l'Eau – Saint-Just-en-Chaussée – Gannes – Breteuil-Embranchement – La Faloise – Ailly-sur-Noye – Dommartin-Remiencourt – Boves – Longueau - Amiens
P14	Saint-Quentin – Montescourt – Mennessis – Tergnier – Viry-Noureuil – Chauny – Appilly – Noyon – Ourscamps – Ribécourt – Thourotte – Longueil-Annel – Compiègne
P15	Crépy-en-Valois – Vaumoise – Villers-Cotterêts – Corcy – Longpont – Vierzy – Soissons – Crouy – Margival – Vauxaillon – Anizy-Pinon – Clacy-Mons – Laon
P20	Amiens – Villers-Bretonneux – Marcelcave – Rosières – Chaulnes – Nesle – Ham – Flavy-le-Martel – Mennessis – Tergnier – La Fère – Versigny – Crépy-Couvron – Laon
P21	Abbeville ... Amiens ... Albert
P22	Amiens ... Albert ... Arras
P23	Amiens ... Hargicourt—Pierrepont – Montdidier ... Compiègne
P24	Amiens ... Abancourt
P30	Le Tréport-Mers ... Abancourt ... Marseille-en-Beauvaisis ... Beauvais
P32	Beauvais ... Creil
P40/P41	Douai - Sin-le-Noble ... Cambrai ... Busigny ... Saint-Quentin
P42	Lens ... Hénin-Beaumont ... Douai
P43	Douai ... Somain ... Valenciennes
P44	Douai ... Arras
P45	Amiens - Saint-Roch - Poix-de-Picardie - Abancourt ... Serqueux ... Rouen-Rive-Droite
P51	Béthune ... Saint-Pol-sur-Ternoise
P52	Hazebrouck ... Béthune ... Lens ... Arras
P53	Étaples-Le Touquet ... Saint-Pol-sur-Ternoise ... Arras
P54/P71	Calais-Ville ... Hazebrouck ... Béthune ... Lens ... Arras
P60	Valenciennes ... Aulnoye-Aymeries ... Maubeuge ... Jeumont
P61/64	Aulnoye-Aymeries ... Avesnes-sur-Helpe ... Hirson ... Marle-sur-Serre ... Laon
P62	Saint-Quentin ... Busigny - Le Cateau ... Aulnoye-Aymeries
P63	Valenciennes ... Denain ... Cambrai
P70	Hazebrouck ... Dunkerque
P72	Calais-Ville – Les Fontinettes – Beau-Marais – Gravelines – Bourbourg – Grande-Synthe – Coudekerque-Branche – Dunkerque
P73	Rang-du-Fliers - Étaples-Le Touquet ... Boulogne-Ville ... Calais-Ville
P80	Lille-Flandres ... Roubaix – Tourcoing
P81	Lille-Flandres ... Ascq ... (Belgium) Tournai
Saisonnières (éTER)	Route
S02	Jeumont ↔ Maubeuge ↔ Aulnoye-Aymeries ↔ Valenciennes ↔ Dunkerque
S03	Hirson ↔ Valenciennes ↔ Dunkerque
S04	Saint-Quentin ↔ Cambrai ↔ Douai ↔ Dunkerque
S04	Laon ↔ Tergnier ↔ Amiens ↔ Abbeville ↔ Noyelles-sur-Mer ↔ Rue ↔ Rang-du-Fliers-Verton-Berck ↔ Étaples-Le Touquet ↔ Boulogne-Ville ↔ Calais-Ville

=== Bus ===
Line	Bus route
P82	Ascq – Orchies
P83	Lille - Comines
17	Somain – Lourches
40	Creil – Senlis – Roissy
41	Crépy-en-Valois – Roissy
42	Amiens – Beauvais
43	Montdidier – Saint-Just-en-Chaussée
44	Montdidier – Chaulnes – Péronne – Roisel
45	Laon – Montcornet – Rozoy-sur-Serre
48	La Ferté-Milon – Fère-en-Tardenois – Fismes
49	Étrépagny – Gisors – Cergy–Préfecture

== See also ==
- Réseau Ferré de France
- List of SNCF stations in Hauts-de-France
