= Paris–Lille railway =

Train infrastructure in northern France

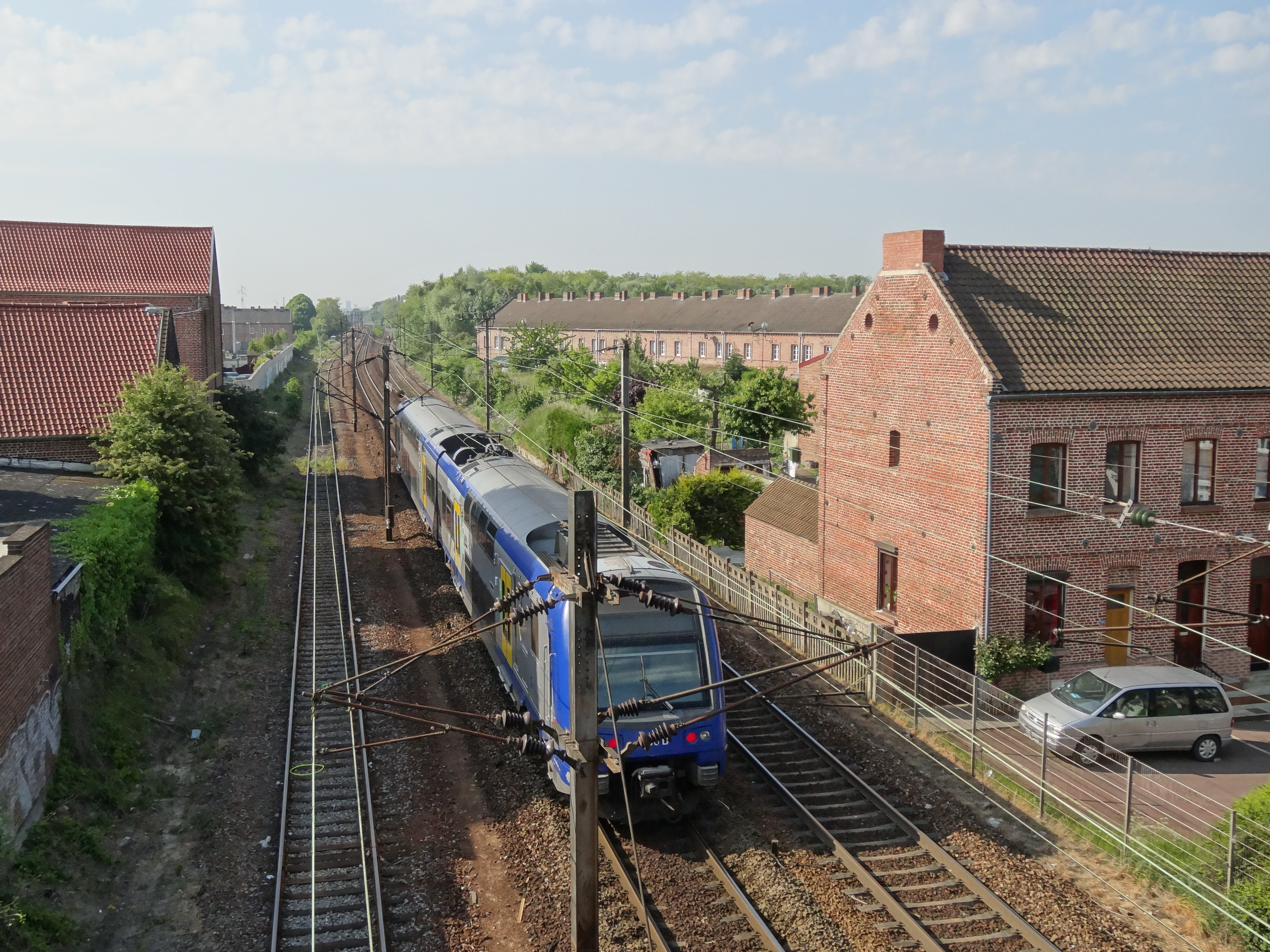
- The railway near Douai

Overview
- Status: Operational
- Owner: RFF
- Locale: France (Île-de-France, Hauts-de-France)
- Termini: Gare du Nord, Paris; Gare de Lille-Flandres

Service
- System: SNCF
- Operator(s): SNCF

History
- Opened: 1846-1859

Technical
- Line length: 251 km (156 mi)
- Number of tracks: Double track
- Track gauge: 1,435 mm (4 ft 8 1/2 in) standard gauge
- Electrification: 25 kV 50 Hz AC

The Paris–Lille railway is a 251-kilometre-long (156 mi) railway line, that connects the French capital, Paris, to the northern city of Lille. Branch lines offer connections to Belgium and Great Britain. Opened on 20 June 1846, it was one of the first railway lines in France. The opening of the parallel LGV Nord high speed line in 1993 has decreased its importance for long-distance passenger traffic.

== Route ==
The Paris–Lille railway begins at the Gare du Nord in Paris, running north for 6 km until Saint-Denis. From here, it climbs in northeastern direction at a constant 5 mm/km incline. Near Marly-la-Ville, it turns north and then northwest, and descends towards the river Oise. At Creil, the Oise is crossed. The line to Saint-Quentin and Brussels branches off at Creil.

The line leaves the Oise valley and continues north to the river Somme at Longueau near Amiens. Here the Longueau–Boulogne railway to the Gare d'Amiens and Boulogne-sur-Mer branches off to the west, and a line to Laon to the east. The line to Lille continues in northeastern direction, following the valley of the Somme until Corbie, and then the river Ancre until Miraumont, where the line turns north until it reaches Arras.

From Arras it follows the river Scarpe in eastern direction until Douai, where it turns northwest. After Ostricourt it turns north again, entering the agglomeration of Lille. After a total length of 251 km, it reaches its terminus Gare de Lille-Flandres.

=== Main stations ===
The main stations on the Paris–Lille railway are:

- Gare du Nord (Paris)
- Gare de Creil
- Gare de Longueau
- Gare d'Arras
- Gare de Douai
- Gare de Lille-Flandres

== History ==
The idea of linking France to Belgium and Great Britain was studied by the French Government as early as 1833. By November 1842, the northern French cities Lille and Valenciennes were already connected to the Belgian railway network. In July 1844 a law was passed that determined the route of the new railway from Paris to Lille. Exploitation of the line from Paris to Lille and several branch lines was granted to the Compagnie des chemins de fer du Nord. Owners of the CF du Nord were Hottinger, Laffitte, Blount and Baron de Rothschild as president. The railway line as well as the Parisian station was inaugurated in June 1846.

The line originally passed through the Oise valley, along Saint-Ouen-l'Aumône and Persan. This way a steep climb and descent between Saint-Denis and Creil could be avoided. The arrival of stronger engines prompted the CF du Nord to construct a 19 km shorter line between Saint-Denis and Creil over the plateau, passing along Chantilly. This new section was opened on 10 May 1859.

Since the opening of the LGV Nord high speed line between Paris and Lille in 1993, most long-distance passenger traffic has shifted away from the classical Paris–Lille line. It remains an important railway for freight traffic and regional passenger traffic.

== Services ==
The Paris–Lille railway is used by the following passenger services:

- TGV, Thalys and Eurostar on the section between Paris and Villiers-le-Bel - Gonesse, and on short stretches near Arras and Lille
- TGV additionally on the section between Arras and Lille
- Intercités from Paris to Boulogne on the section between Paris and Longueau, and Intercités from Paris to Cambrai and Maubeuge on the section between Paris and Creil
- TER Hauts-de-France regional services on the whole line
- Transilien regional services on the section between Paris and Saint-Denis
- RER D Paris rapid transit on the section between Paris and Creil
