= Creil station =

Railway station in Creil, France

Coordinates: 49°15′50″N 2°28′9″E

Creil
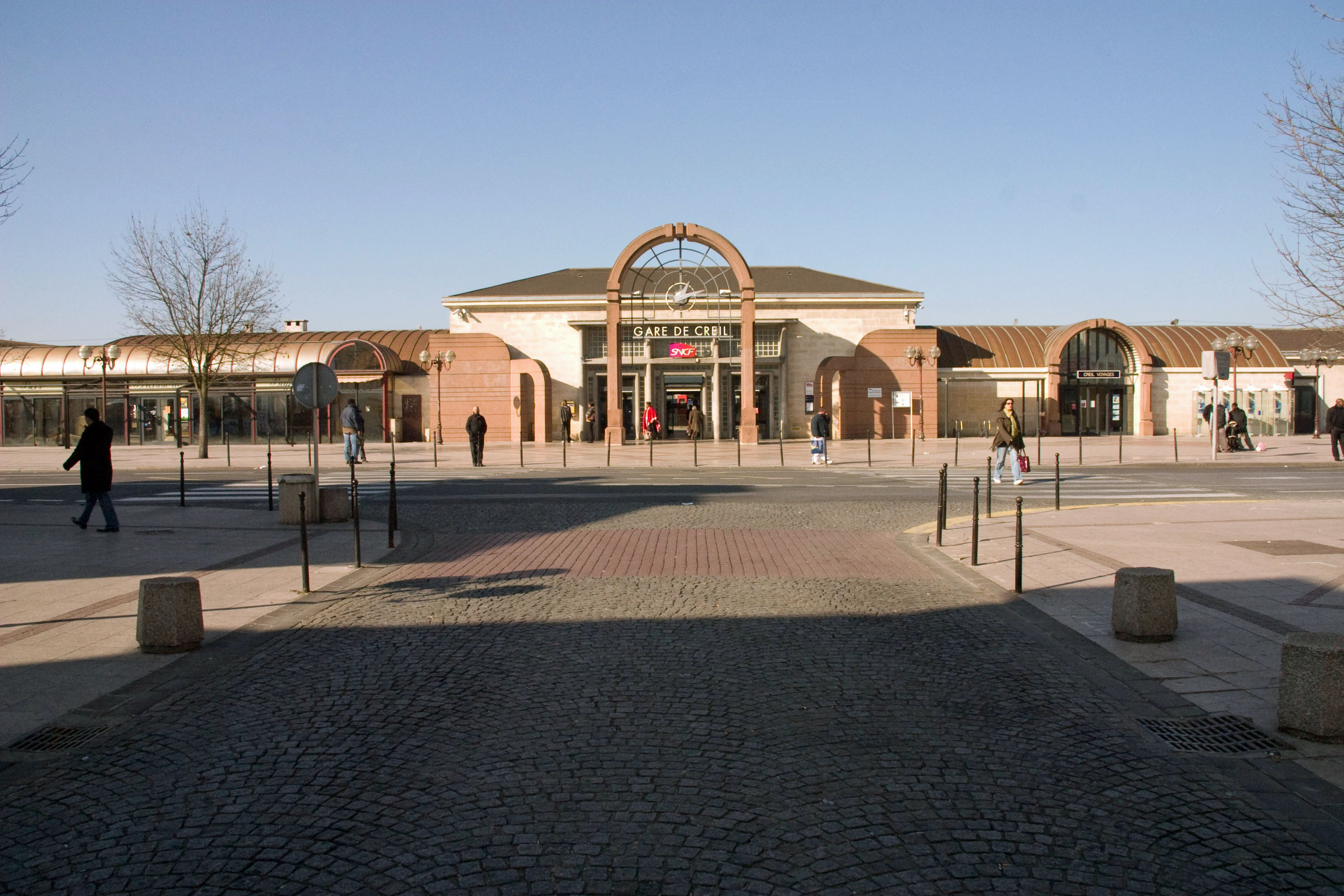

General information
- Owner: SNCF
- Operator: SNCF
- Lines: RER D Line H

Other information
- Station code: 87276006

History
- Opened: 20 June 1846; 180 years ago

Passengers
- 2024: 5,886,782

Services
Preceding station	TER Hauts-de-France	Following station
Clermont-de-l'Oise towards Amiens	Krono K10	Paris-Nord Terminus
Paris-Nord Terminus	Krono K12	Longueau towards Lille-Flandres
Pont-Sainte-Maxence towards Saint-Quentin	Krono K14	Paris-Nord Terminus
Laigneville towards Amiens	Citi C10	Chantilly-Gouvieux towards Paris-Nord
Villers-Saint-Paul towards Compiègne	Citi C14	Chantilly-Gouvieux towards Paris-Nord
Laigneville towards Amiens	Proxi P10	Terminus
Montataire towards Beauvais	Proxi P32	Terminus
Preceding station	Transilien	Following station
Saint-Leu-d'Esserent towards Pontoise	Line H	Terminus
Preceding station	RER	Following station
Terminus	RER D	Chantilly-Gouvieux towards Melun or Malesherbes
Location

Creil is the railway station serving the northern French city of Creil. It is an important railway junction, situated on the Paris–Lille railway, the Creil–Jeumont railway and the branch lines to Beauvais and Pontoise.

The station is served by omnibus trains to Paris as well as regional services to and from Amiens, Compiègne and further. As well as Intercités trains, Creil is well served by TER trains, and RER D and is part of the TER Hauts-de-France network.
