= Compiègne station =

Railway station in Oise, France

Coordinates: 49°25′22″N 2°49′31″E

Compiègne
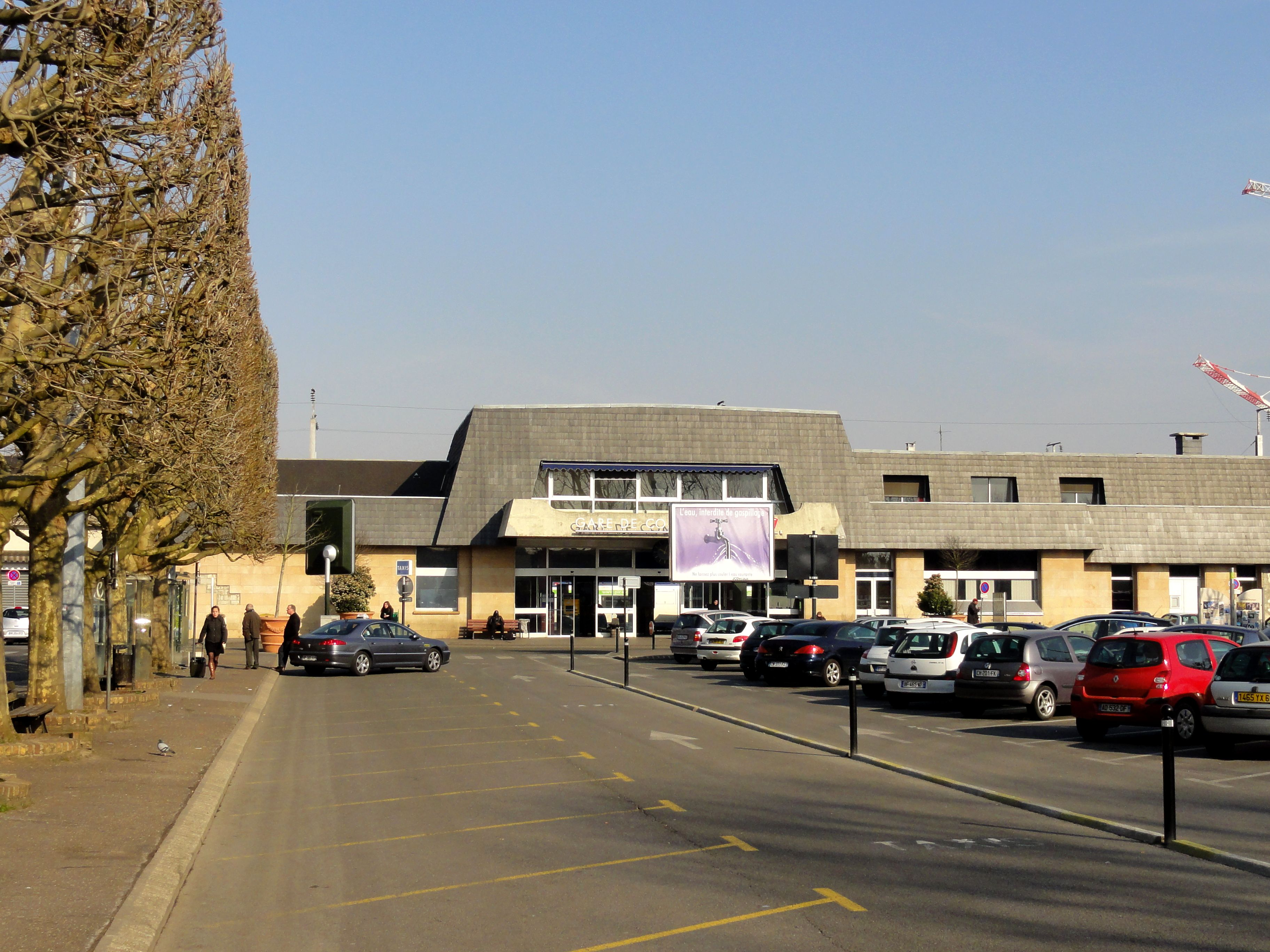
- Compiègne station passenger building in 2013.

General information
- Location: Rue de la Gare; 60200 Compiègne; Oise, France
- Elevation: 37 m (121 ft)
- Owner: SNCF
- Operator: SNCF

History
- Opened: 21 October 1847

Passengers
- 2024: 2,804,320

Services
Preceding station	TER Hauts-de-France	Following station
Saint-Quentin towards Cambrai or Maubeuge	Krono K13	Paris-Nord Terminus
Noyon towards Saint-Quentin	Krono K14	Pont-Sainte-Maxence towards Paris-Nord
Terminus	Citi C14	Jaux towards Paris-Nord
Longueil-Annel towards Saint-Quentin	Proxi P14	Terminus
Rémy towards Amiens	Proxi P23	Terminus
Location

Compiègne station (French: Gare de Compiègne) is a railway station serving Compiègne, in the Oise department of northern France. The station is on the Creil–Jeumont railway. It is served by regional trains to Creil, Amiens, Saint-Quentin and Paris.
