= Guignicourt station =

Railway station in Guignicourt, France

Guignicourt
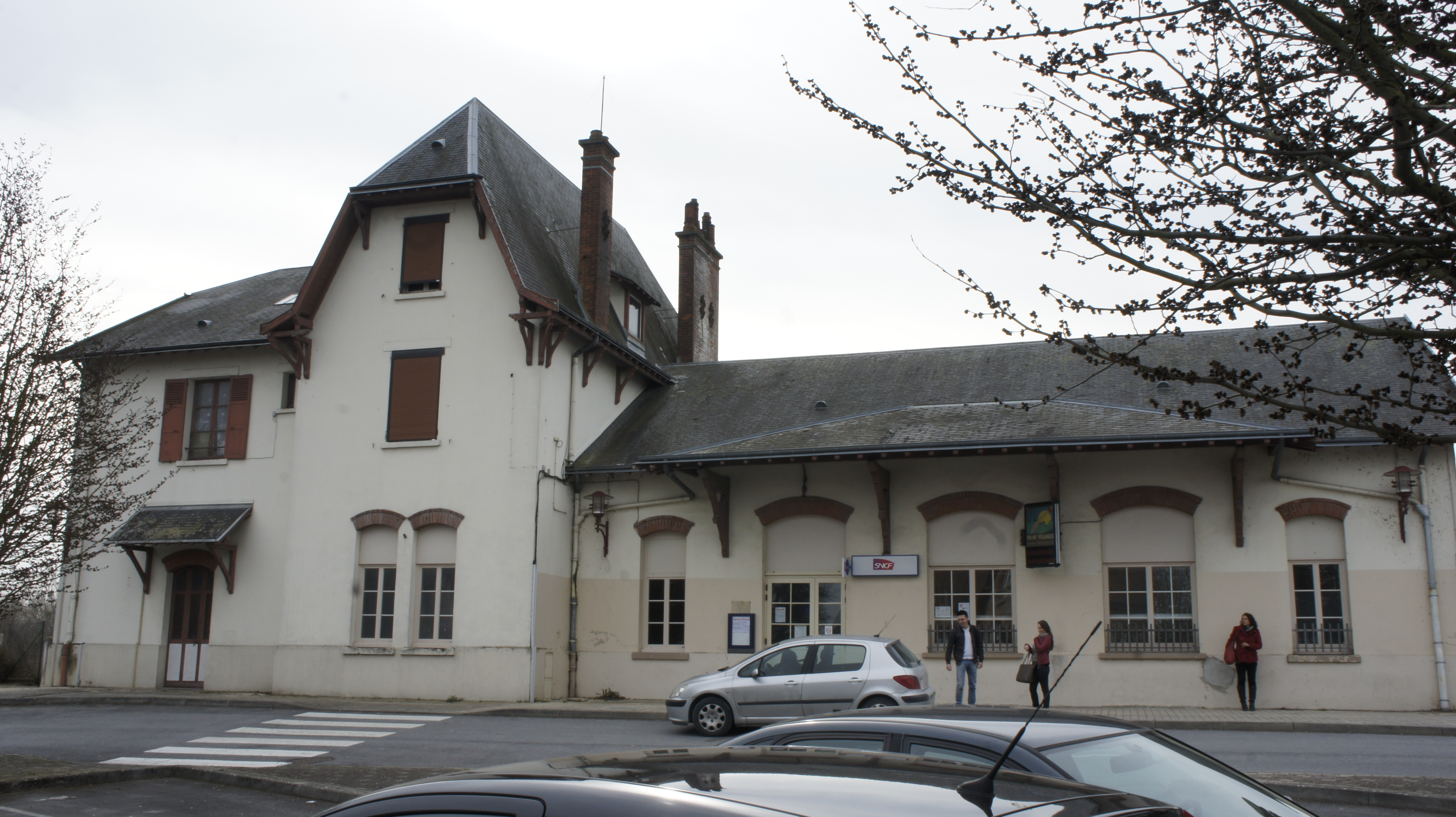

General information
- Location: Place de la gare, Guignicourt; 02190 Villeneuve-sur-Aisne; Aisne, France
- Coordinates: 49°26′05″N 3°57′41″E
- Elevation: 67 m (220 ft)
- Owner: SNCF
- Operator: SNCF
- Line: Reims–Laon railway
- Distance: 21.272 km
- Platforms: 2
- Tracks: 2 (+ service tracks)

Other information
- Station code: 87171736

History
- Opened: 31 August 1857

Passengers
- 2018: 122,047

Services
Preceding station	TER Grand Est	Following station
Amifontaine towards Laon	C10	Aguilcourt—Variscourt towards Reims
Location

Guignicourt station (French: Gare de Guignicourt) is a railway station located in the commune Villeneuve-sur-Aisne and in the delegated commune of Guignicourt, department of Aisne, northern France. The station is located 500 m from the city center of Guignicourt at kilometric point (KP) 21.272 on the Reims-Laon railway. It is served by TER Grand Est trains between Reims and Laon (line C10) operated by the SNCF.

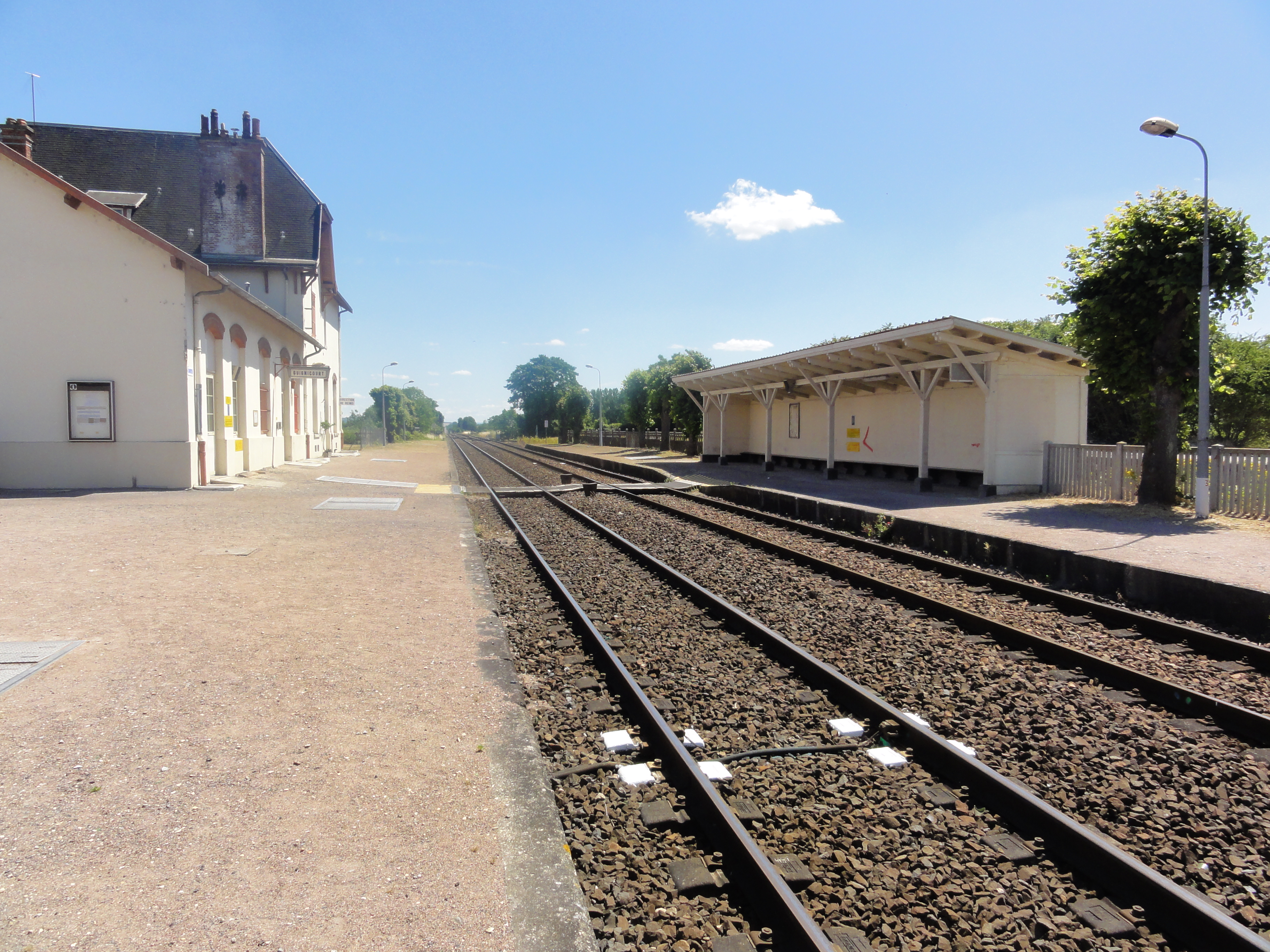
The station's platforms

In 2018, the SNCF estimated that 122,047 passengers travelled through the station.

== History ==
On 31 August 1857, the Compagnie des chemins de fer des Ardennes commenced passenger operations on the 52km Reims-Laon railway, on which the station is situated. Freight services commenced a couple of months later on 15 October 1857.

On 23 October 2014, during SNCF construction work near the station, deminers disposed of 342 German World War I shells.
