= Aguilcourt–Variscourt halt =

Railway halt in Variscourt, France

Aguilcourt–Variscourt
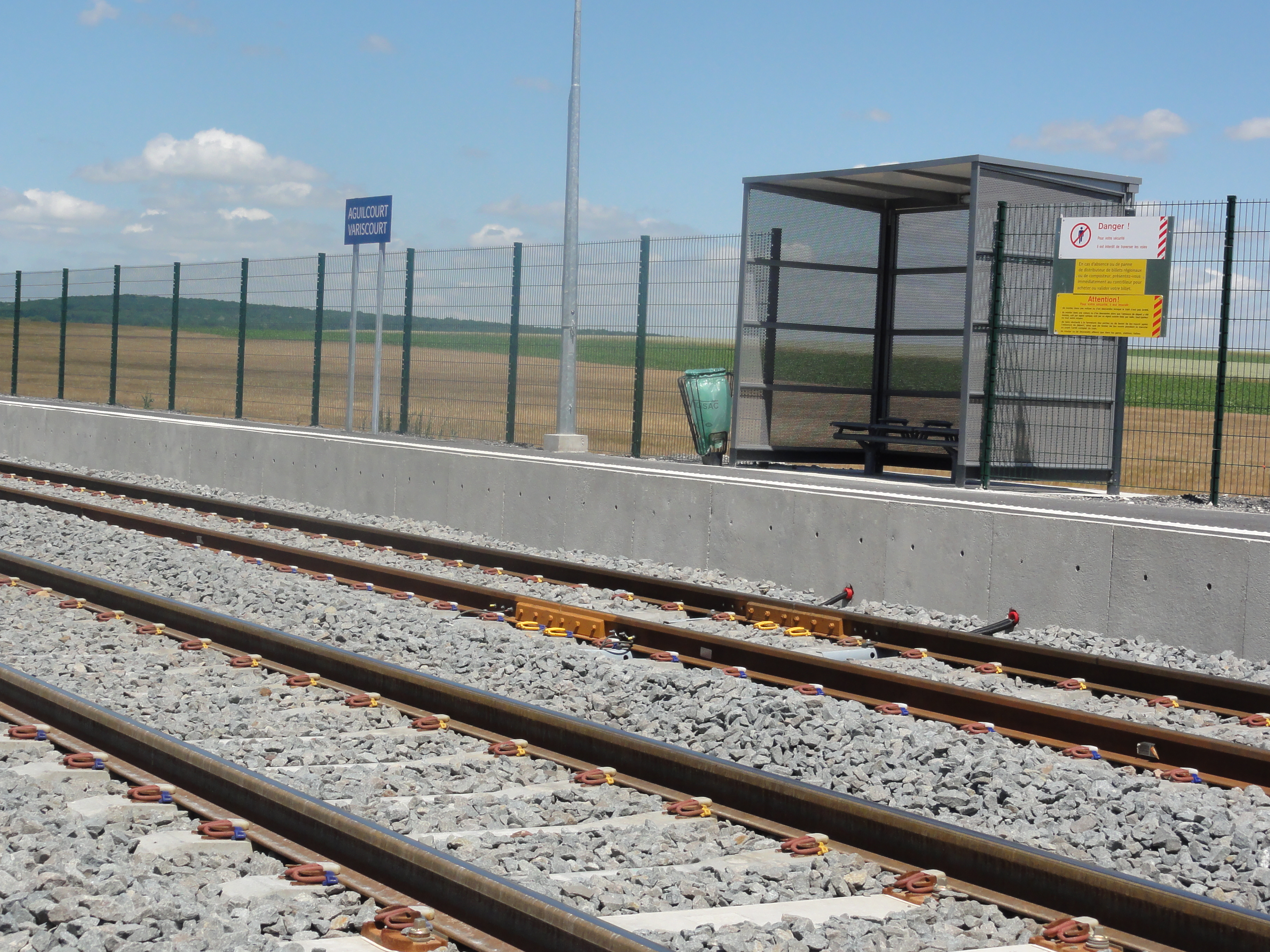

General information
- Location: Rue de Reims; 02190 Variscourt; Aisne, France
- Coordinates: 49°24′29″N 3°58′23″E
- Elevation: 54 m (177 ft)
- Owner: SNCF
- Operator: SNCF
- Line: Reims–Laon railway
- Distance: 18.187 km
- Platforms: 2
- Tracks: 2

Other information
- Station code: 87171702

Passengers
- 2018: 6,155

Services
Preceding station	TER Grand Est	Following station
Guignicourt towards Laon	C10	Loivre towards Reims
Location

Aguilcourt–Variscourt halt (French: Halte d'Aguilcourt–Variscourt) is a railway halt located in the commune of Variscourt, Aisne department in northern France. The halt also serves the nearby commune of Aguilcourt. It is located at kilometric point (KP) 18.187 on the Reims–Laon railway and served by TER Grand Est trains operated by the SNCF.

In 2018, the SNCF estimated that the halt served 6,155 passengers.

== Gallery ==
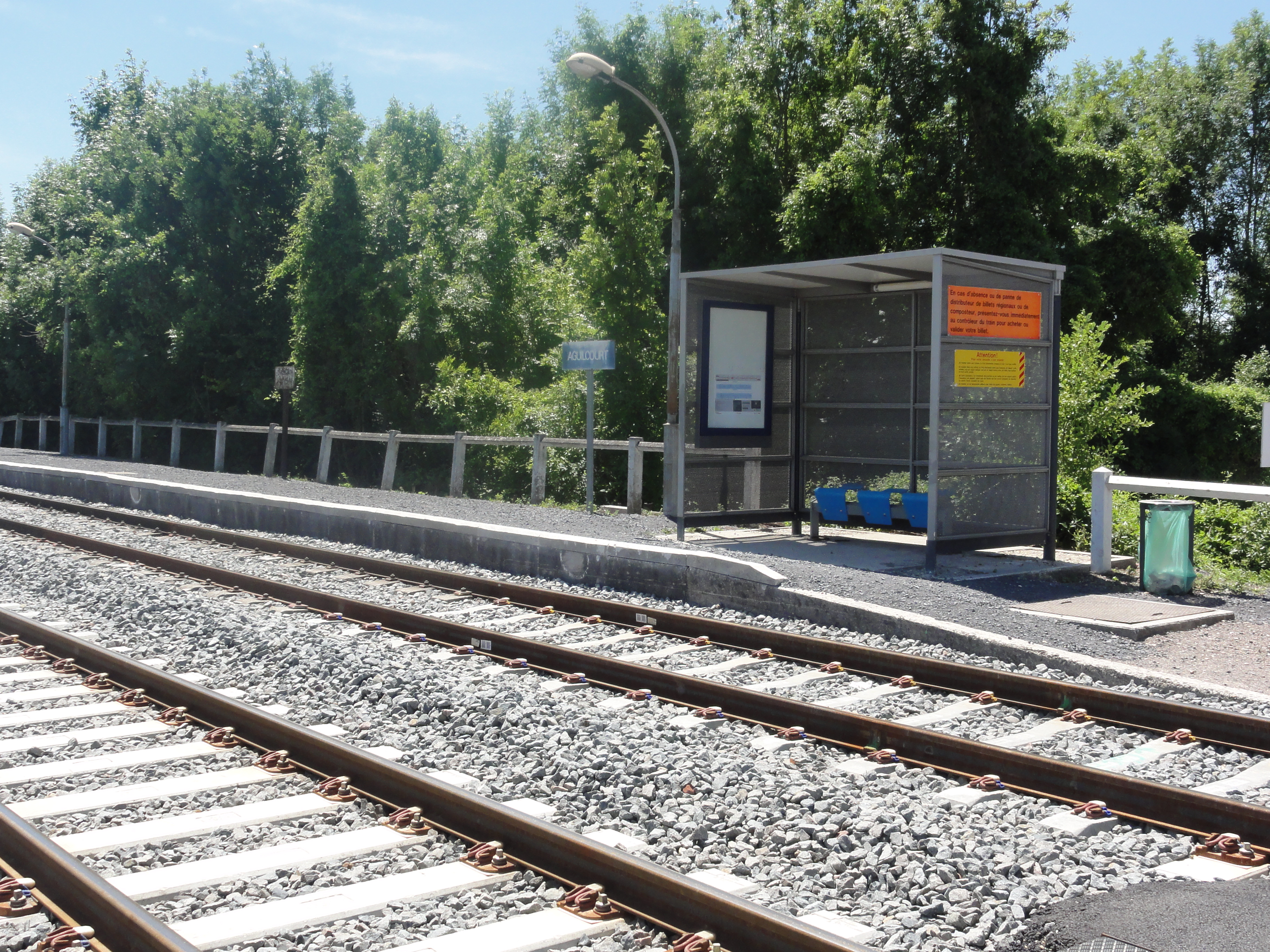
Platform in the direction of Laon

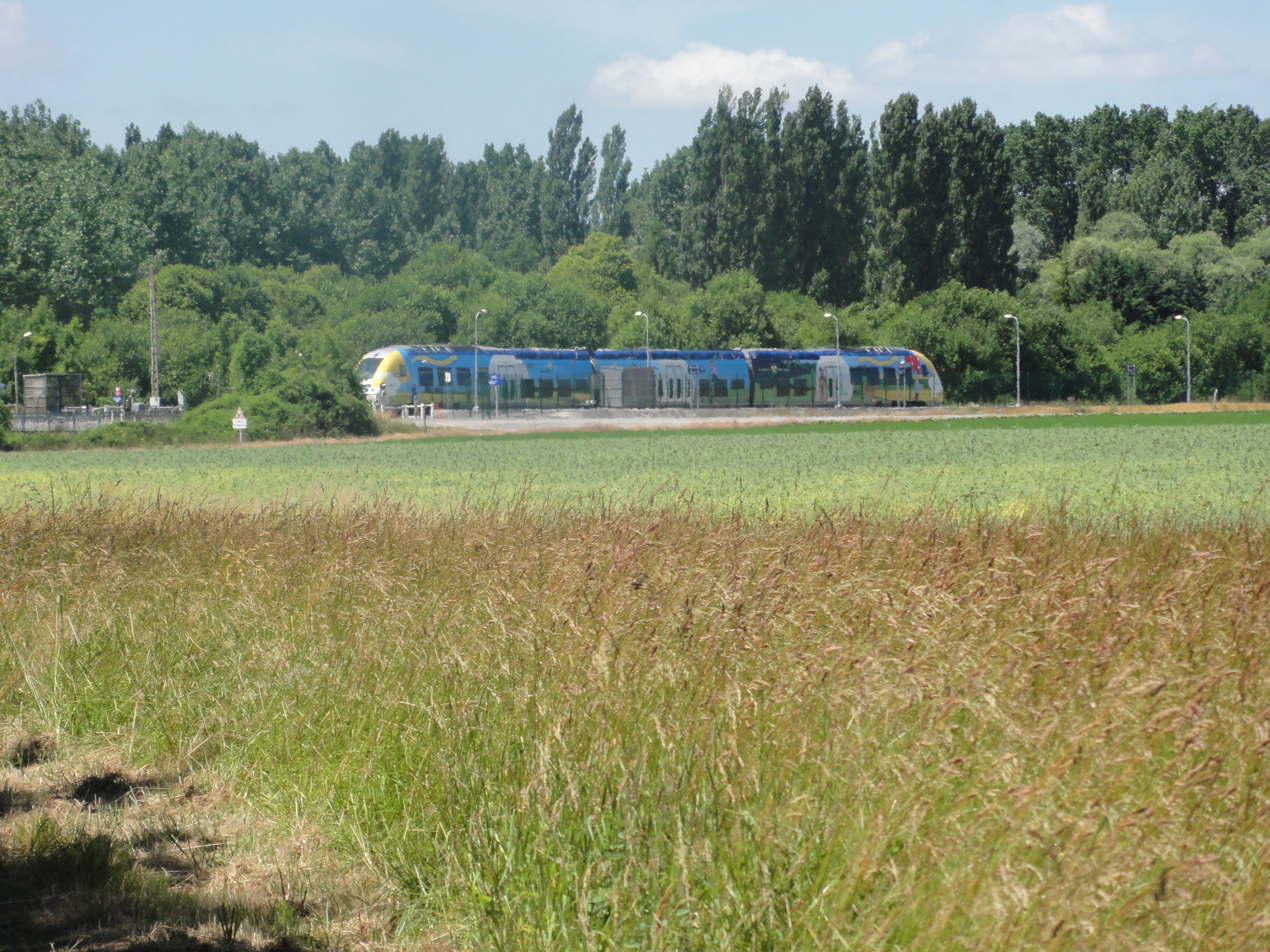
TER Champagne-Ardenne (now TER Grand Est) train leaving Aguilcourt—Variscourt

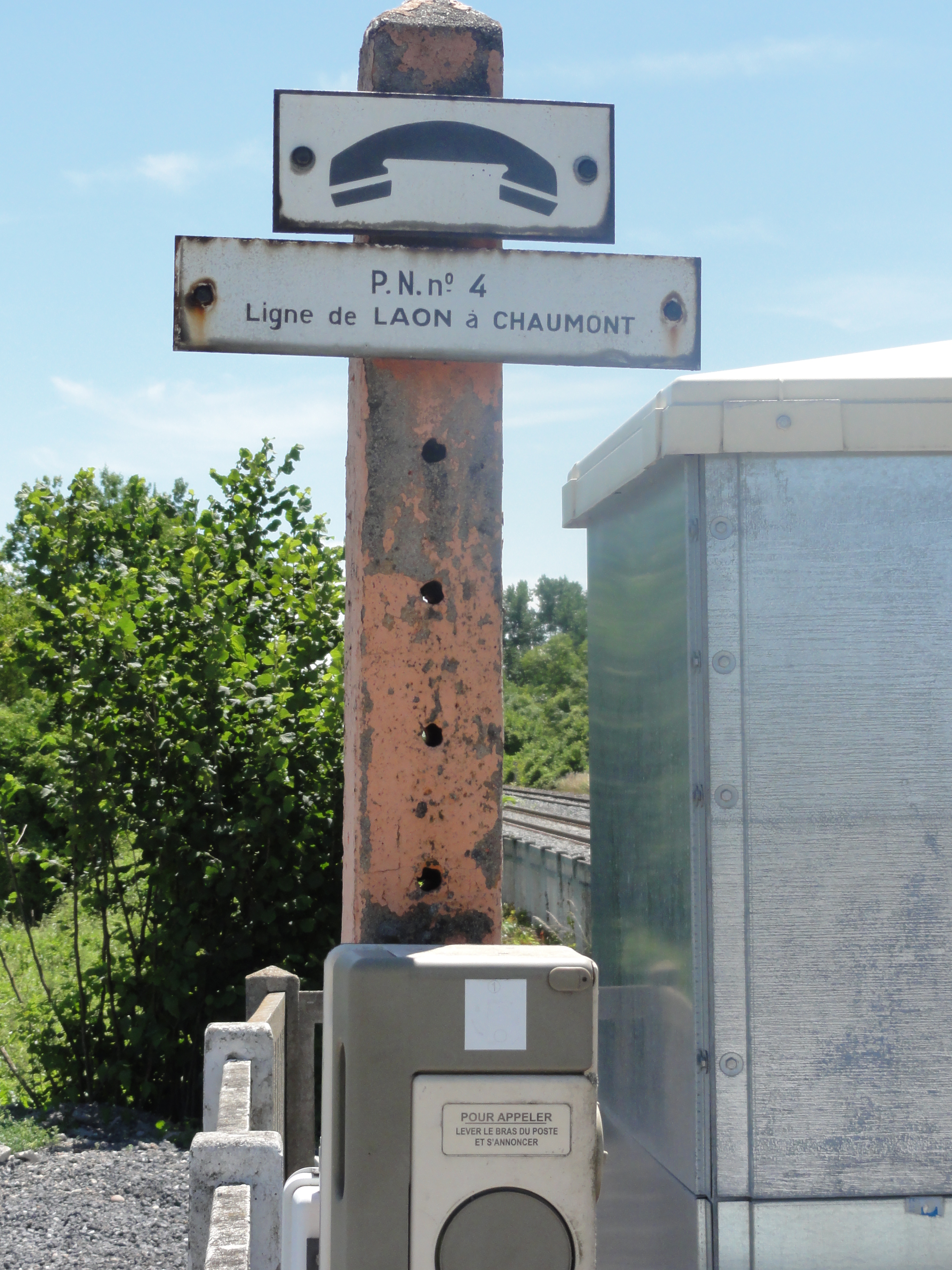
P.N. #4 emergency phone

== See also ==
- List of SNCF stations in Hauts-de-France
