= Loivre station =

French railway station

Loivre
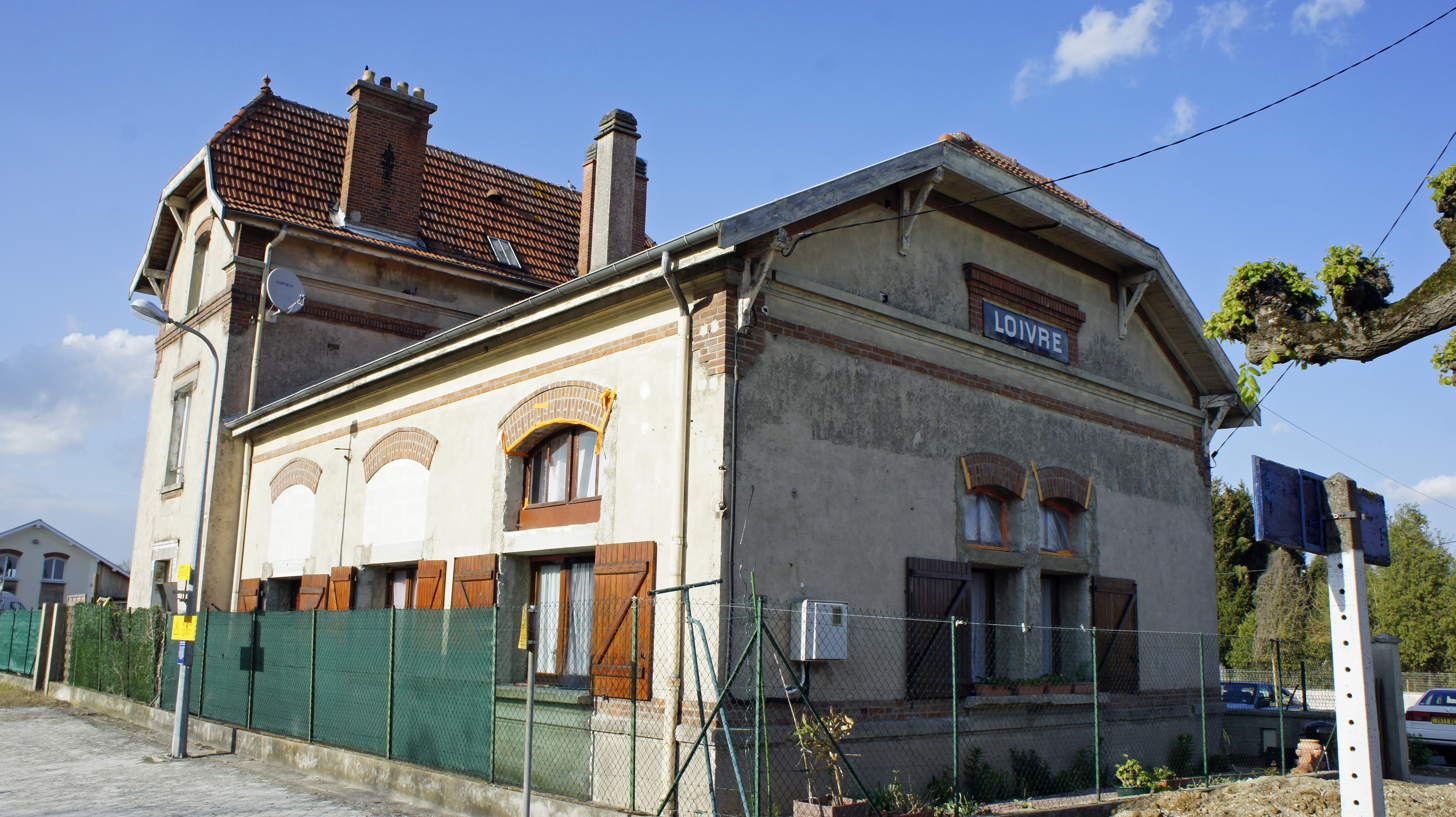

General information
- Location: Rue des Fontaines; 51220 Loivre; Marne, France
- Coordinates: 49°20′48″N 3°59′27″E
- Elevation: 81 m (266 ft)
- Owner: SNCF
- Operator: SNCF
- Line: Reims-Laon railway
- Distance: 11.219 km
- Platforms: 2
- Tracks: 2

Other information
- Station code: 87171728

History
- Opened: 31 August 1857

Passengers
- 2018: 27,644

Services
Preceding station	TER Grand Est	Following station
Aguilcourt—Variscourt towards Laon	C10	Courcy–Brimont towards Reims
Location

Loivre station (French: Gare de Loivre) is a railway station in the commune of Loivre, Marne department in northern France. The station is located at kilometric point (KP) 11.219 on the Reims-Laon railway and served by TER Grand Est trains operated by the SNCF.

In 2018, the SNCF recorded 27,644 passenger movements through the station.
