= Saint-Erme station =

Railway station in Saint-Erme-Outre-et-Ramecourt, France

Saint-Erme
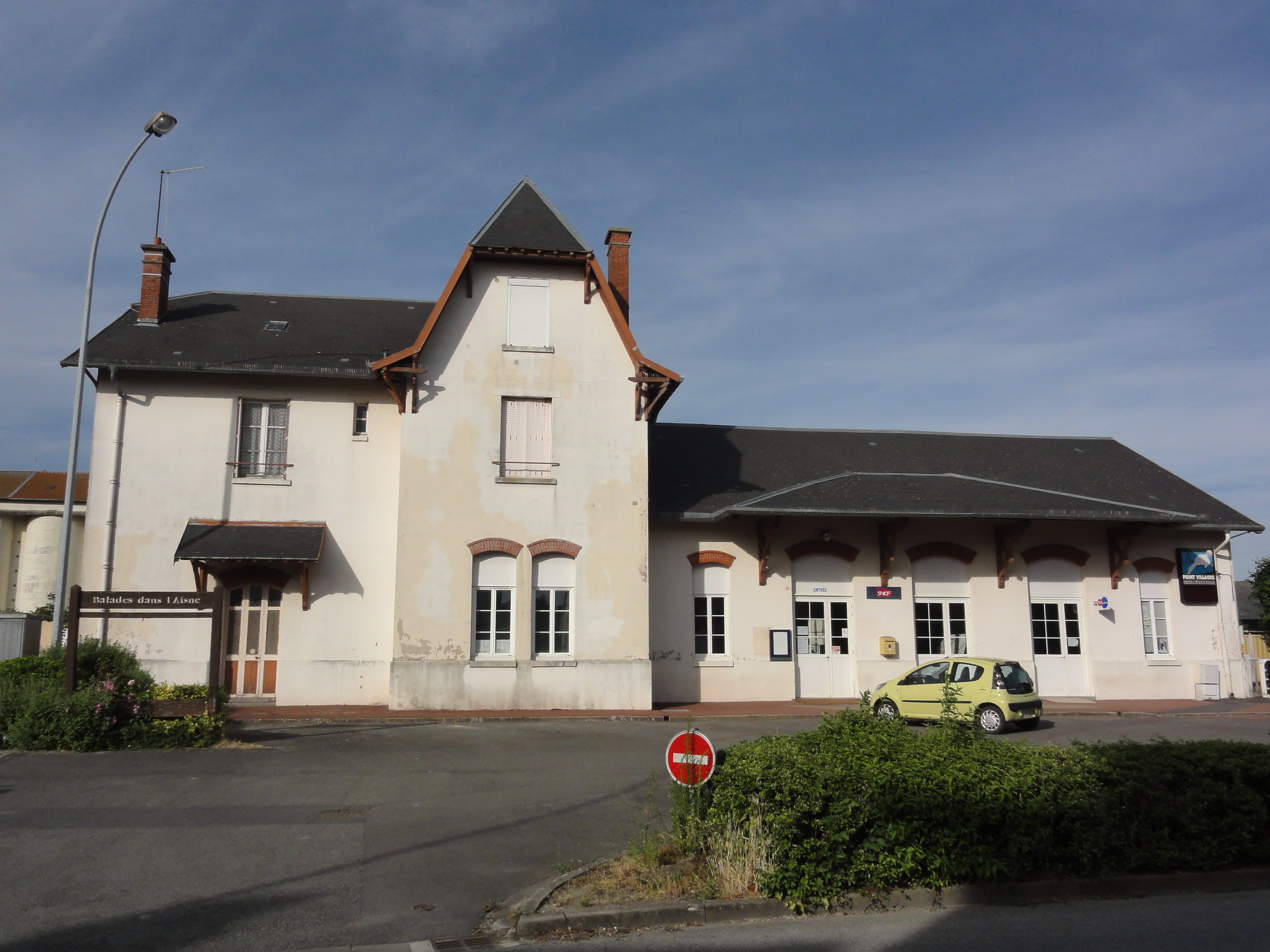

General information
- Location: Place de la gare 02820 Saint-Erme-Outre-et-Ramecourt; Aisne, France
- Coordinates: 49°31′37″N 3°51′27″E
- Elevation: 101 m (331 ft)
- Owner: SNCF
- Operator: SNCF
- Line: Reims–Laon railway
- Distance: 34.102km
- Platforms: 2
- Tracks: 2 (+ service tracks)

Other information
- Station code: 87171751

History
- Opened: 31 August 1857

Passengers
- 2018: 72,014

Services
Preceding station	TER Grand Est	Following station
Coucy-lès-Eppes towards Laon	C10	Amifontaine towards Reims
Location

Saint-Erme station (French: Gare de Saint-Erme) is a railway station located in the commune of Saint-Erme-Outre-et-Ramecourt, in the department of Aisne, northern France. The station is located close to the commune of Montaigu. It is situated at kilometric point (KP) 34.102 on the Reims-Laon railway. It is served by TER Grand Est trains between Reims and Laon (line C10) operated by the SNCF.

In 2018, the SNCF recording 72,014 passenger movements through the station.

== History ==
On 31 August 1857, the Compagnie des chemins de fer des Ardennes commenced passenger operations on the 52km Reims-Laon railway, on which the station is situated. Freight services commenced a couple of months later on 15 October 1857.
