= Amifontaine station =

French railway station in the commune of Amifontaine

Amifontaine

General information
- Location: 02190 Amifontaine; Aisne, France
- Coordinates: 49°29′05″N 3°54′38″E
- Elevation: 74 m (243 ft)
- Owner: SNCF
- Operator: SNCF
- Line: Reims–Laon railway
- Distance: 27.949km
- Platforms: 2
- Tracks: 2

Other information
- Station code: 87171744

History
- Opened: between 1861 and 1868

Passengers
- 2018: 15,470

Services
| Preceding station | TER Grand Est | Following station |
|---|---|---|
| Saint-Erme towards Laon | C10 | Guignicourt towards Reims |
Location

Amifontaine station (French: Gare d'Amifontaine) is a French railway station located in the commune of Amifontaine, in the department of Aisne, northern France. The station is situated at kilometric point (KP) 27.949 on the Reims-Laon railway. It is served by TER Grand Est trains between Reims and Laon (line C10) operated by the SNCF.

In 2018, the SNCF recorded 15,470 passenger movements through the station.

== History ==
When the Compagnie des chemins de fer des Ardennes opened the 52 km Reims-Laon railway in 1857, the railway halt in Amifontaine had yet to be established. The station was still absent from the line in 1861. However, by 1868, the French writer Adolphe Joanne indicated the station was in operation in his book Itinéraire général de la France : Vosges et Ardennes. At the time the station served a population of 437 in Amifontaine only on Wednesdays, Saturdays and Sundays.

== See also ==
- List of SNCF stations in Hauts-de-France
