= Reims–Laon railway =

French railway

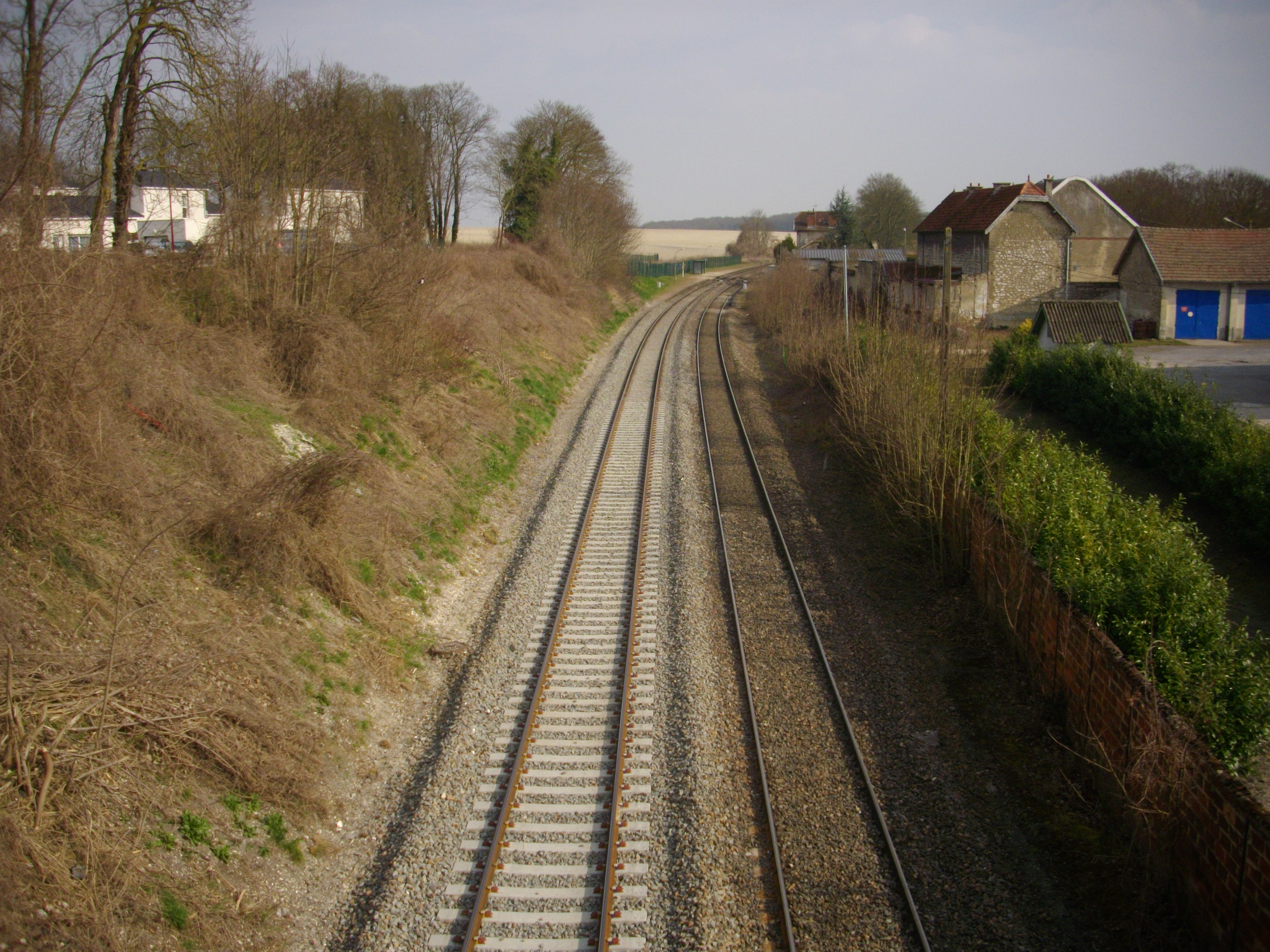
- The railway in La Verrerie (commune of Courcy)

Overview
- Native name: Ligne de Reims à Laon
- Owner: CF du Nord (1852-1857); CF des Ardennes (1857 – 1864); CF de l'Est (1864-1937); SNCF (1938 – 1997); RFF (1997-2014); SNCF (2015-present)
- Line number: 082 000
- Locale: Marne; Aisne
- Termini: Reims; Laon
- Stations: 9

Service
- Operator(s): SNCF

History
- Opened: 1857

Technical
- Line length: 51.962 km (32.288 mi)
- Number of tracks: Double track
- Track gauge: 1,435 mm (4 ft 8 1/2 in) standard gauge
- Electrification: None
- Signalling: BAPR
- Maximum incline: 5 %

The railway line between Reims and Laon (French: Ligne de Reims à Laon) is a French 52 km long railway located in the departments of the Marne and Aisne. The line connects the communes of Reims and Laon along with seven intermediary stops. It consists of line number 082 000 of the réseau ferré national.

== Route ==
In addition to its termini stations, the Reims–Laon railway serves the following SNCF stations:

- Reims station
- Courcy-Brimont station
- Loivre station
- Aguilcourt—Variscourt halt
- Guignicourt station
- Amifontaine station
- Saint-Erme station
- Coucy-lès-Eppes station
- Laon station

=== Train services ===
As of 2020, the entirety of the route is served by TER Grand Est line 10.
