= Courcy–Brimont station =

French railway station

Courcy–Brimont
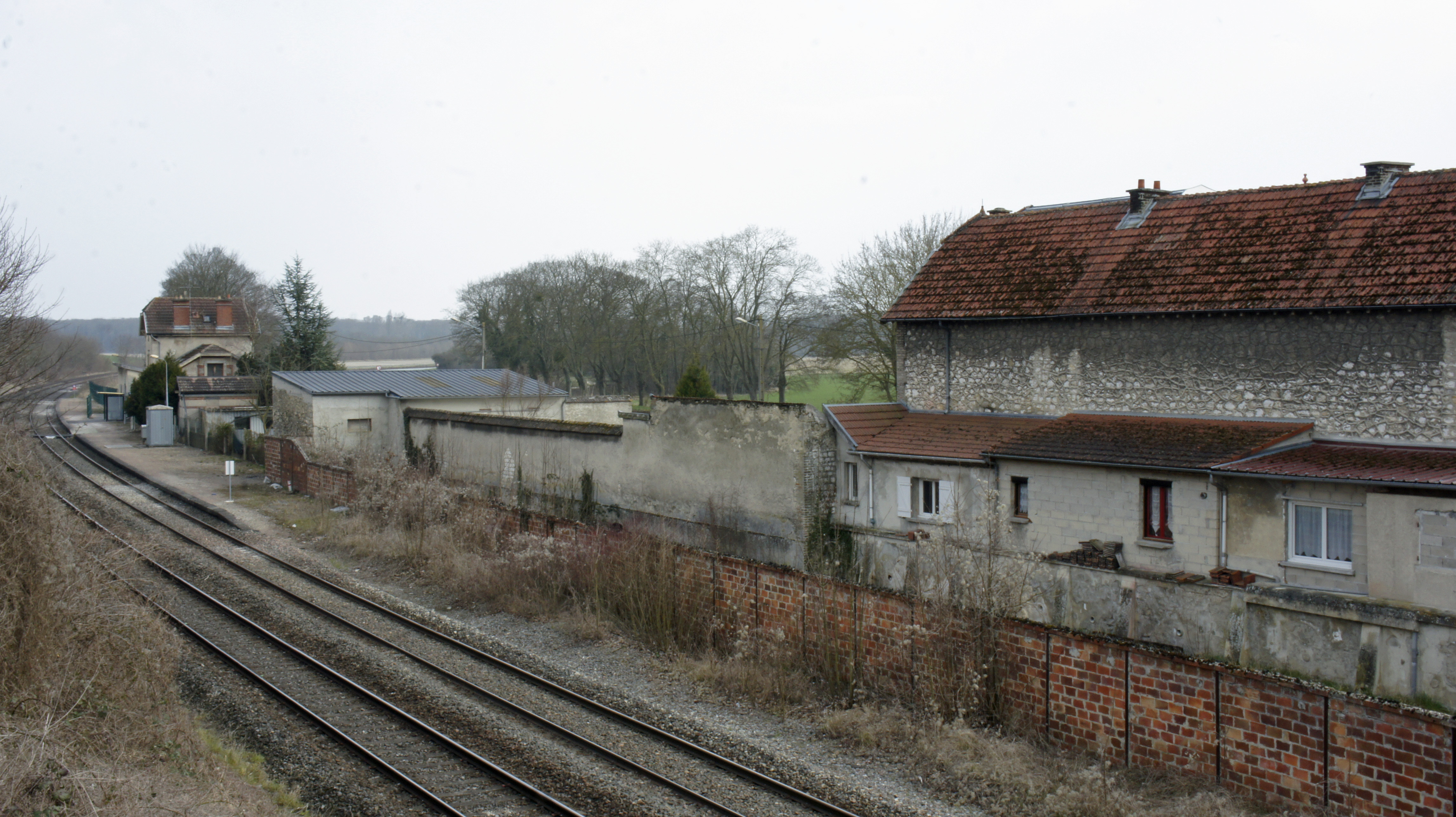

General information
- Location: Rue de la gare 51220 Courcy; Marne, France
- Coordinates: 49°19′46″N 4°00′50″E
- Elevation: 79 m (259 ft)
- Owner: SNCF
- Operator: SNCF
- Line: Reims-Laon railway
- Distance: 8.443 km
- Platforms: 2
- Tracks: 2

Other information
- Station code: 87171710

Passengers
- 2018: 18,016

Services
Preceding station	TER Grand Est	Following station
Loivre towards Laon	C10	Reims Terminus
Location

Courcy–Brimont station (French: Gare de Courcy–Brimont) is a railway station in the commune of Courcy, Marne department, northern France. The station also serves the nearby commune of Brimont. It is at kilometric point (KP) 8.443 on the Reims-Laon railway served by TER Grand Est trains operated by SNCF.

In 2018, SNCF estimated that 18,016 passengers travelled through the station.
