= Coucy-lès-Eppes station =

Railway station in Aisne, France

Coucy-lès-Eppes
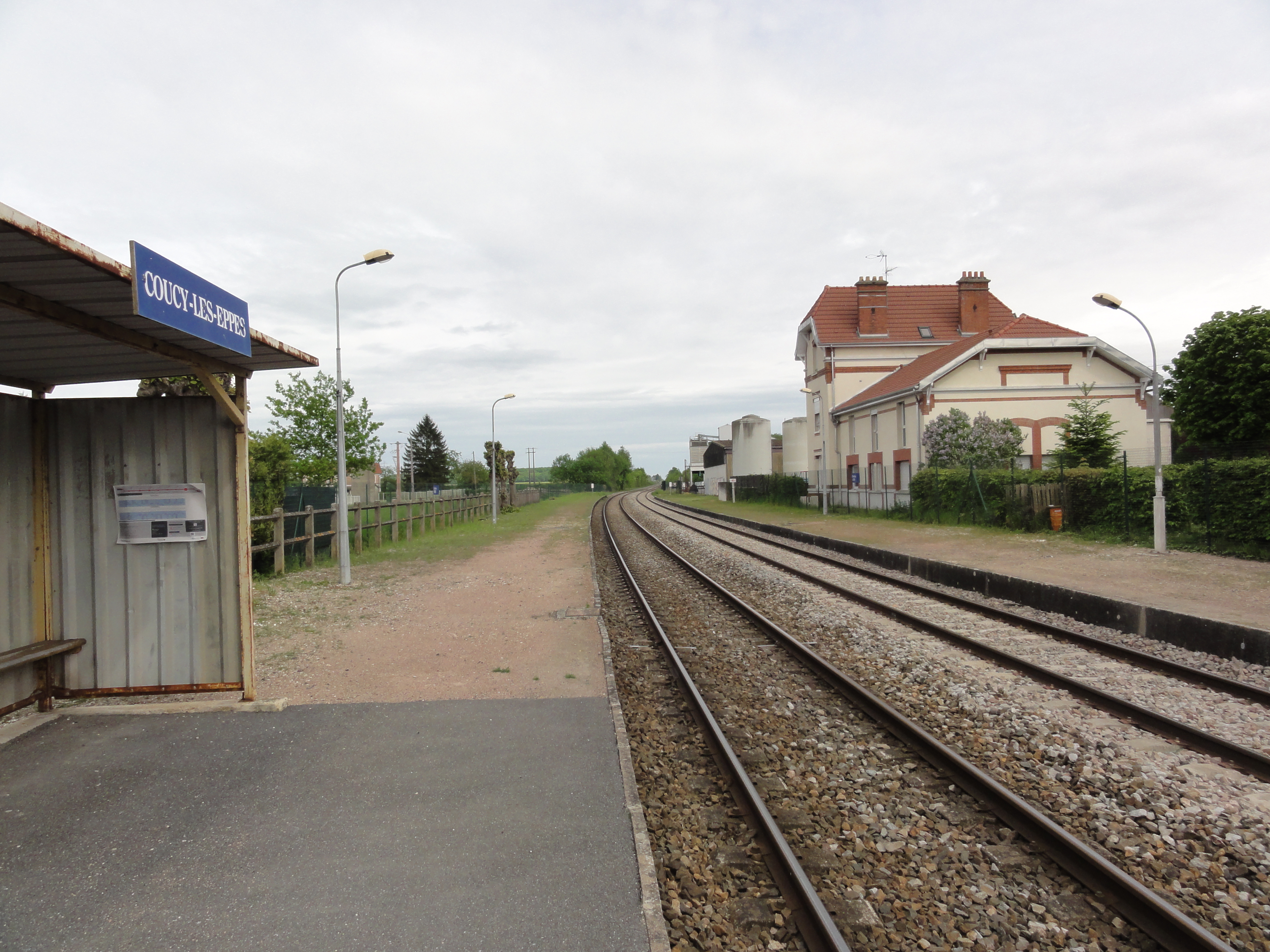

General information
- Location: Rue de la Rouillée; 02840 Coucy-lès-Eppes; Aisne, France
- Coordinates: 49°33′22″N 3°46′31″E
- Elevation: 86 m (282 ft)
- Owner: SNCF
- Operator: SNCF
- Line: Reims-Laon railway
- Distance: 41.022km
- Platforms: 2
- Tracks: 2

Other information
- Station code: 87171769

History
- Opened: 31 August 1857

Passengers
- 2018: 7,267

Services
| Preceding station | TER Grand Est | Following station |
|---|---|---|
| Laon Terminus | C10 | Saint-Erme towards Reims |
Location

Coucy-lès-Eppes station (French: Gare de Coucy-lès-Eppes) is a railway station located in the commune of Coucy-lès-Eppes, in the department of Aisne, northern France. It is situated at kilometric point (KP) 41.022 on the Reims-Laon railway. It is served by TER Grand Est trains between Reims and Laon (line C10) operated by the SNCF.

In 2018, the SNCF recorded 7,267 passenger movements through the station.

== History ==
On 31 August 1857, the Compagnie des chemins de fer des Ardennes commenced passenger operations on the 52 km Reims-Laon railway, on which the station is situated. Freight services commenced a couple of months later on 15 October 1857.

The original station building was destroyed by combat during World War I and replaced at the culmination of the war.

== See also ==
- List of SNCF stations in Hauts-de-France
