= Amifontaine =

- Commune
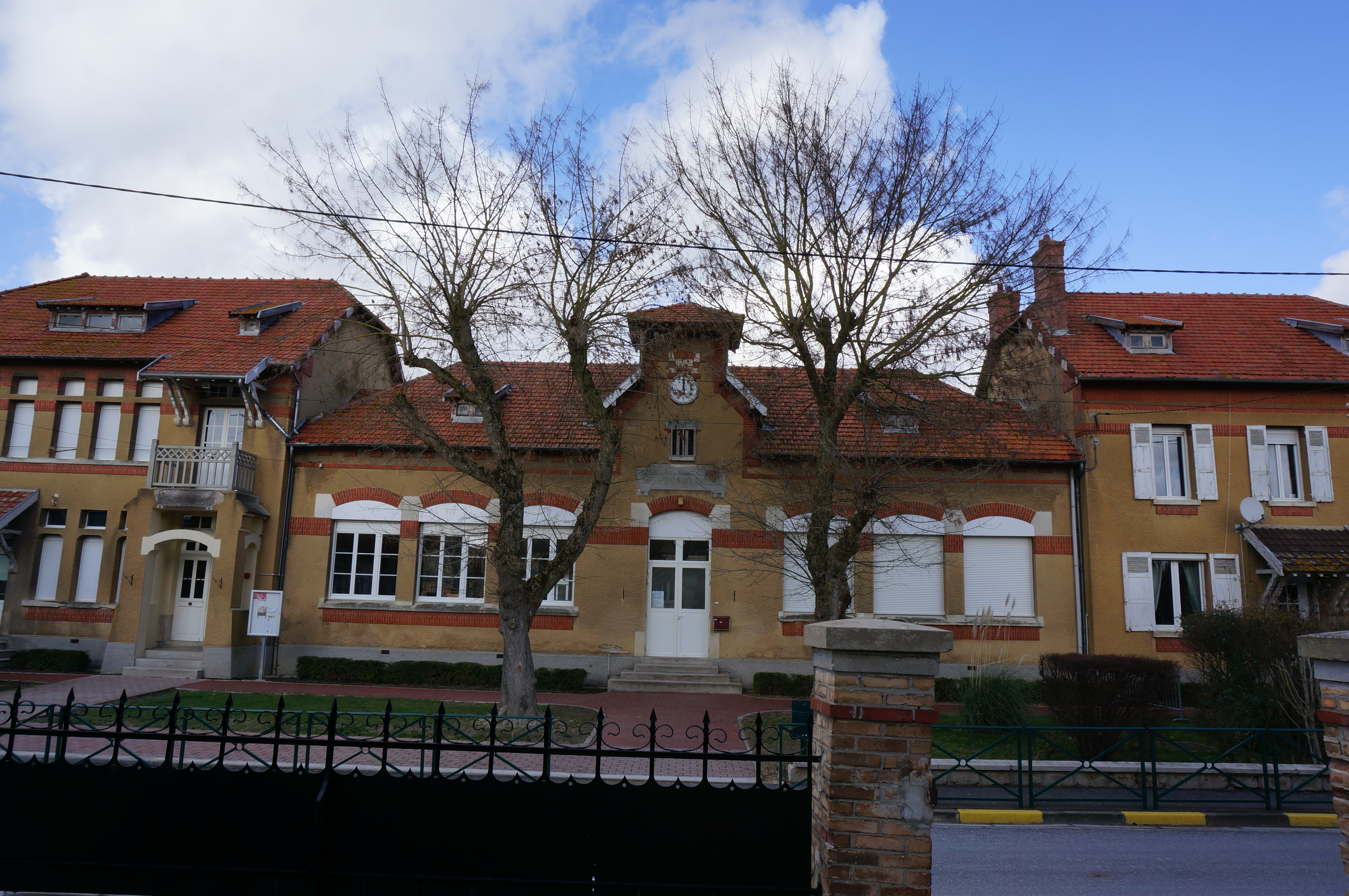
- Town hall
- Location of Amifontaine
- Location within France Location within Hauts-de-France
- Coordinates: 49°29′01″N 3°55′09″E
- Country: France
- Region: Hauts-de-France
- Department: Aisne
- Arrondissement: Laon
- Canton: Villeneuve-sur-Aisne
- Intercommunality: Champagne Picarde

Government
  - Mayor (2026–32): Denis Serin
- Area^{1}: 27.9 km^{2} (10.8 sq mi)
- Elevation: 80 m (260 ft)
- Highest elevation: 119 m (390 ft)
- Lowest elevation: 64 m (210 ft)
- Population (2023): 391
  - Density: 14.0/km^{2} (36.3/sq mi)
- Time zone: UTC+01:00 (CET)
  - Summer (DST): UTC+02:00 (CEST)
- INSEE/Postal code: 02013 /02190
- ^{1} French Land Register data, which excludes lakes, ponds, glaciers > 1 km^{2} (0.386 sq mi or 247 acres) and river estuaries.

Amifontaine (French pronunciation: [amifɔ̃tɛn]) is a commune in the department of Aisne in the Hauts-de-France region of northern France.

== Geography ==
Amifontaine is located some 20 km southeast of Laon and 40 km northwest of Rheims. The Autoroute des Anglais (A26, E17) passes through the western side of the commune from north to south but has no exit in the commune. Access to the commune is by road D52 from Ramecourt in the northwest through the commune to the village and continuing south-east to Prouvais. There is also road D89 from La Malmaison in the northeast through the village to Juvincourt-et-Damary in the southwest. The D24 road also passes through the north of the commune from west to east forming the southern border of a large forested area extending beyond the northern border of the commune. The commune is almost entirely farmland except for the forested area in the north. Amifontaine station has rail connections to Reims and Laon.

The small river Miette (also called La Source à l'Aisne in its uppermost part) rises north of the village and flows south to join the river Aisne near Berry-au-Bac.

== Administration ==
List of Successive Mayors of Amifontaine

In office		Name	Party	Ref.
March 2001	2014	Philippe Bonnet	DVG	
2014	Present	Denis Serin	SE	

== History ==
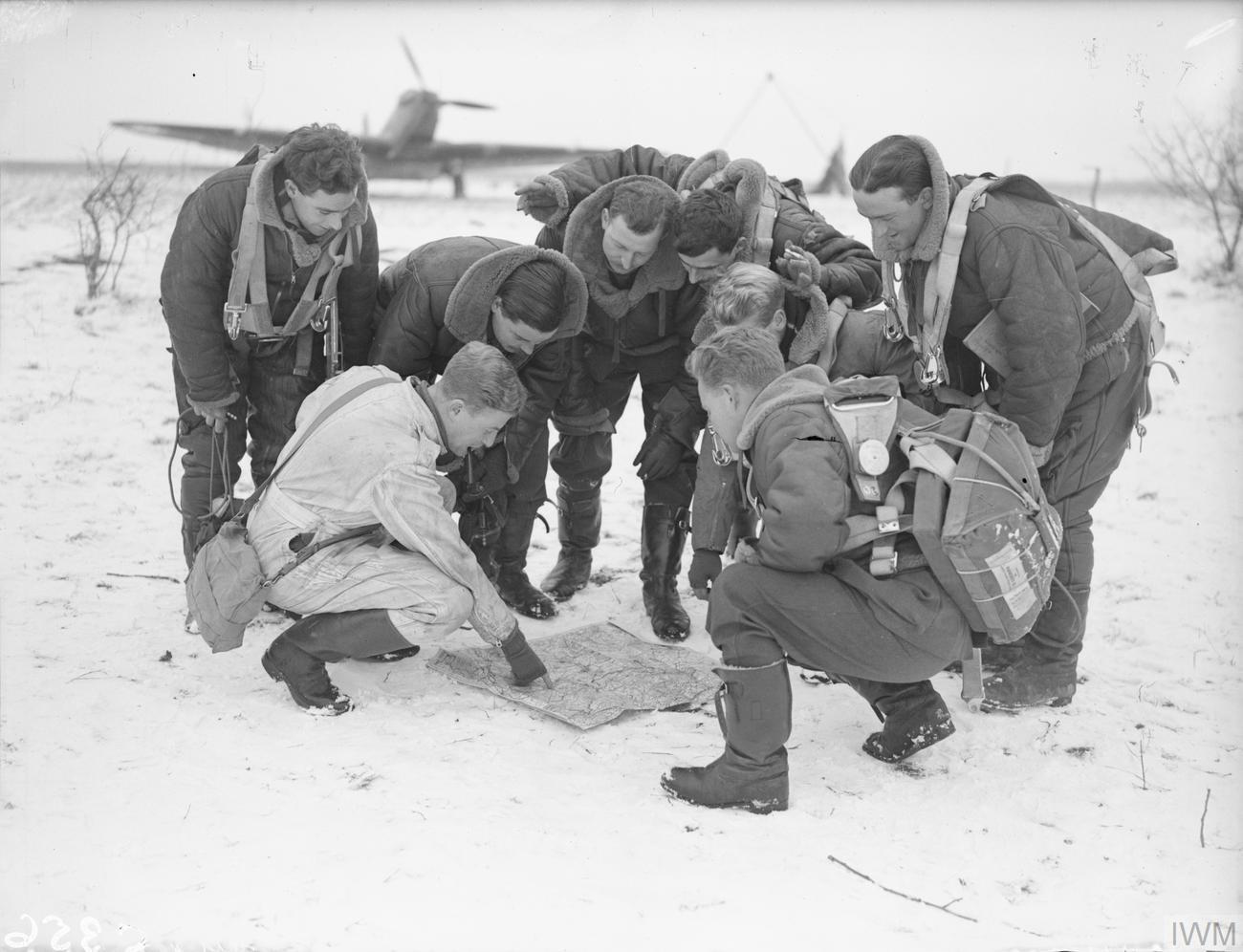
12 Squadron check their maps on the airfield at Amifontaine

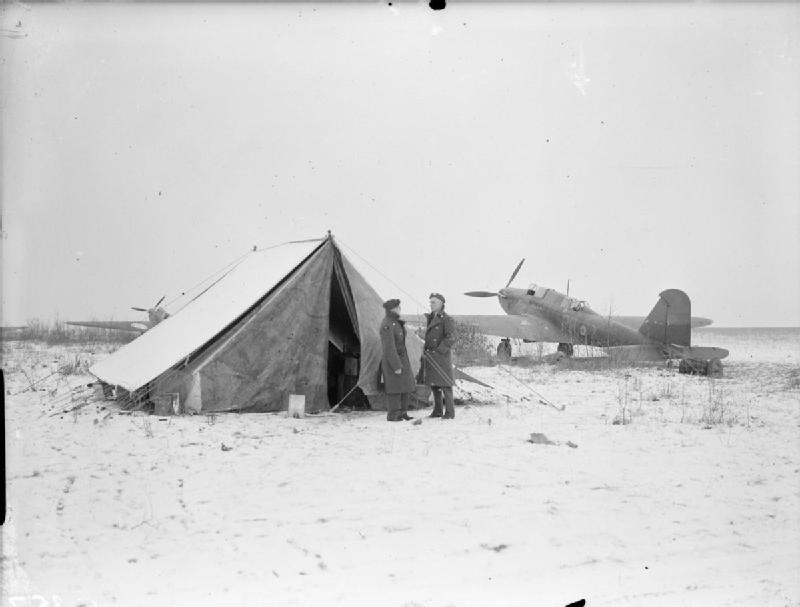
12 Squadron at Amifontaine

From 8 December 1939 to 16 May 1940 No. 12 Squadron RAF was stationed at an airstrip in Amifontaine. On 12 May 1940 a mission was flown from Amifontaine to destroy two bridges over the Albert Canal. Only one out of five aircraft returned. Flying Officer Garland and Sergeant Gray were both awarded posthumous Victoria Crosses for "most conspicuous bravery".

== Population ==
Historical population
Year	Pop.	±% p.a.
1968	417	—
1975	420	+0.10%
1982	376	−1.57%
1990	351	−0.86%
1999	387	+1.09%
2007	404	+0.54%
2012	415	+0.54%
2017	404	−0.54%
2023	391	−0.54%
Source: INSEE

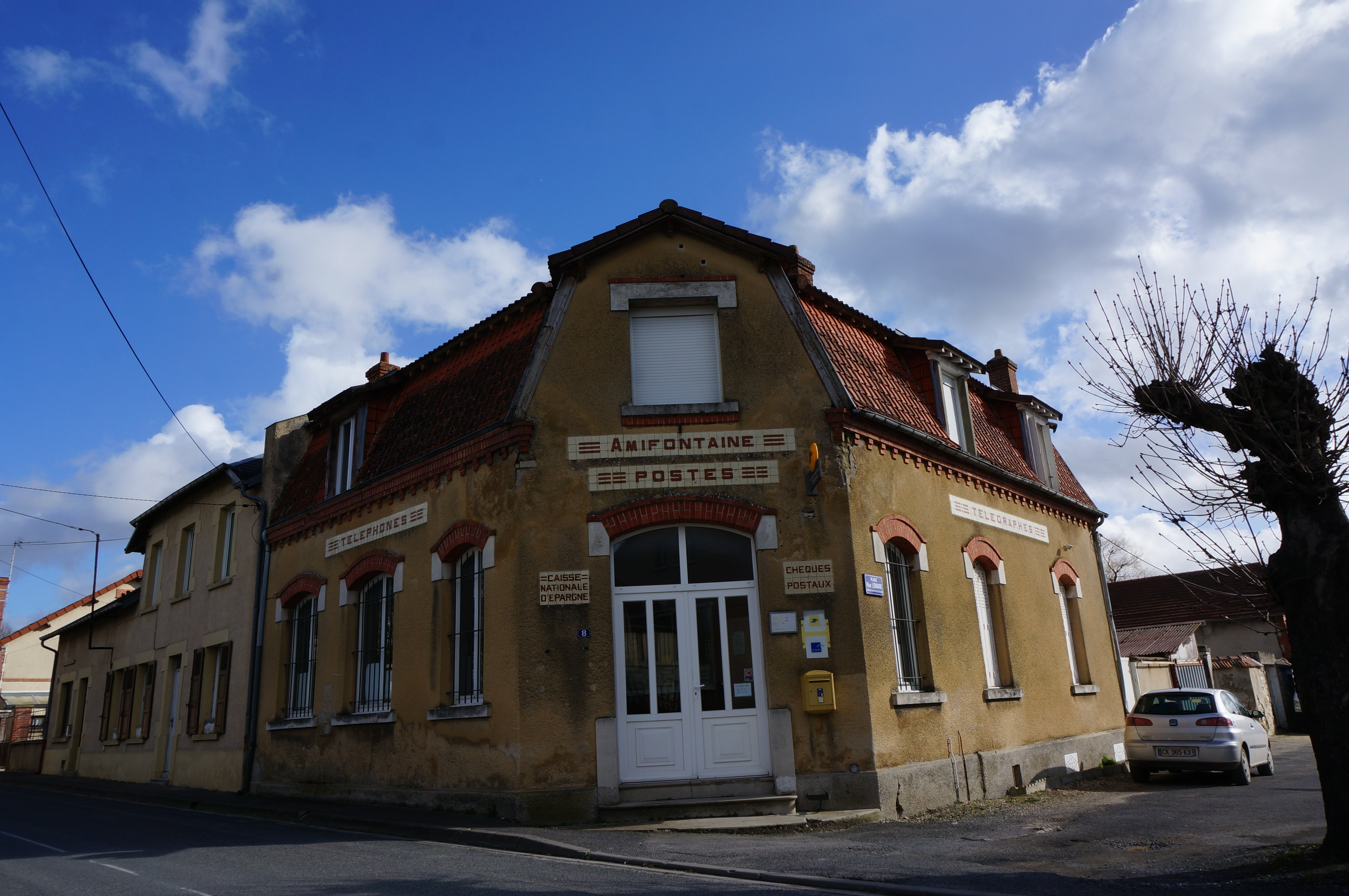
The Post Office

== Sites and monuments ==
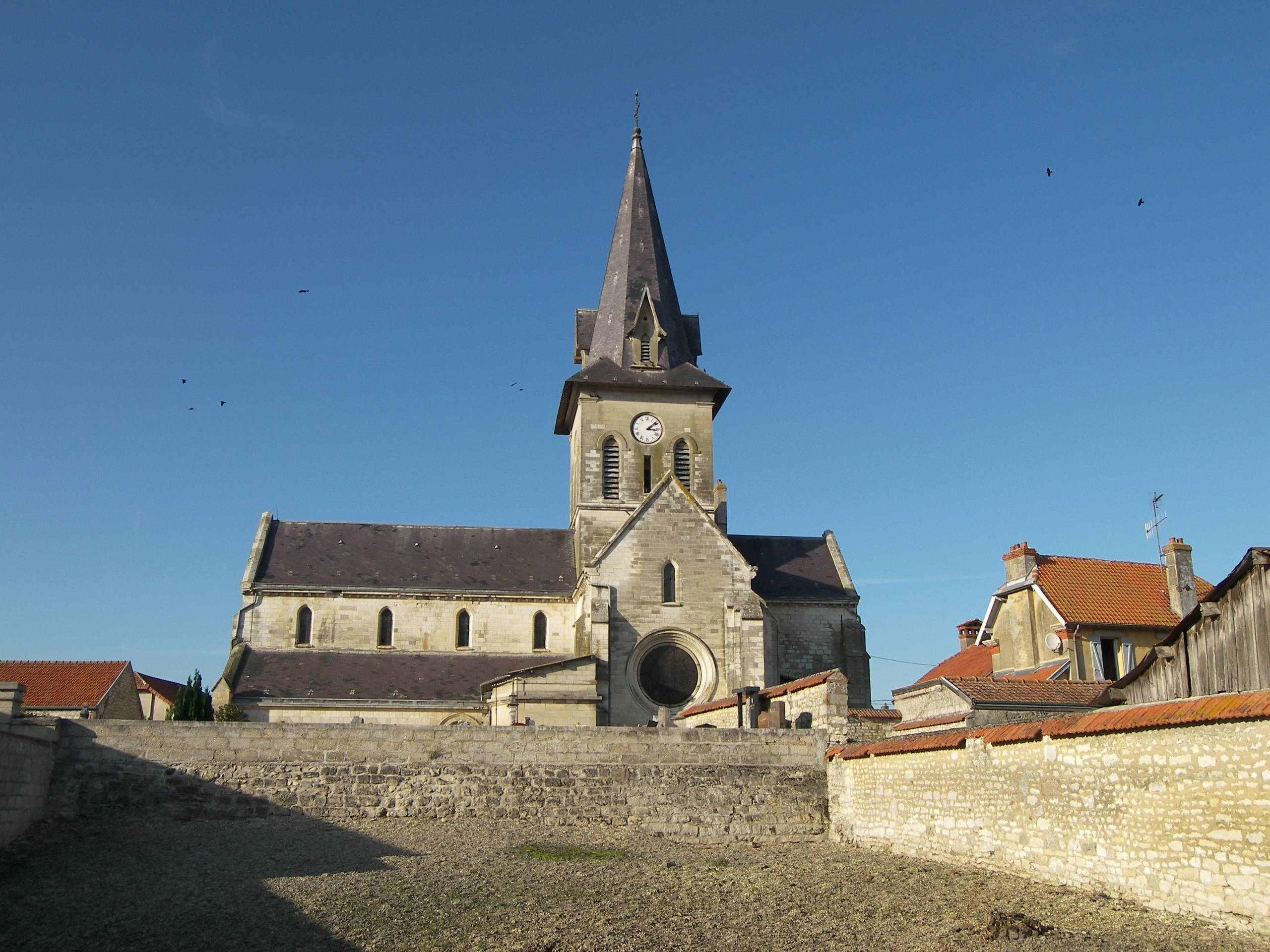
Saint-Rémi Church

- Saint-Rémi Church
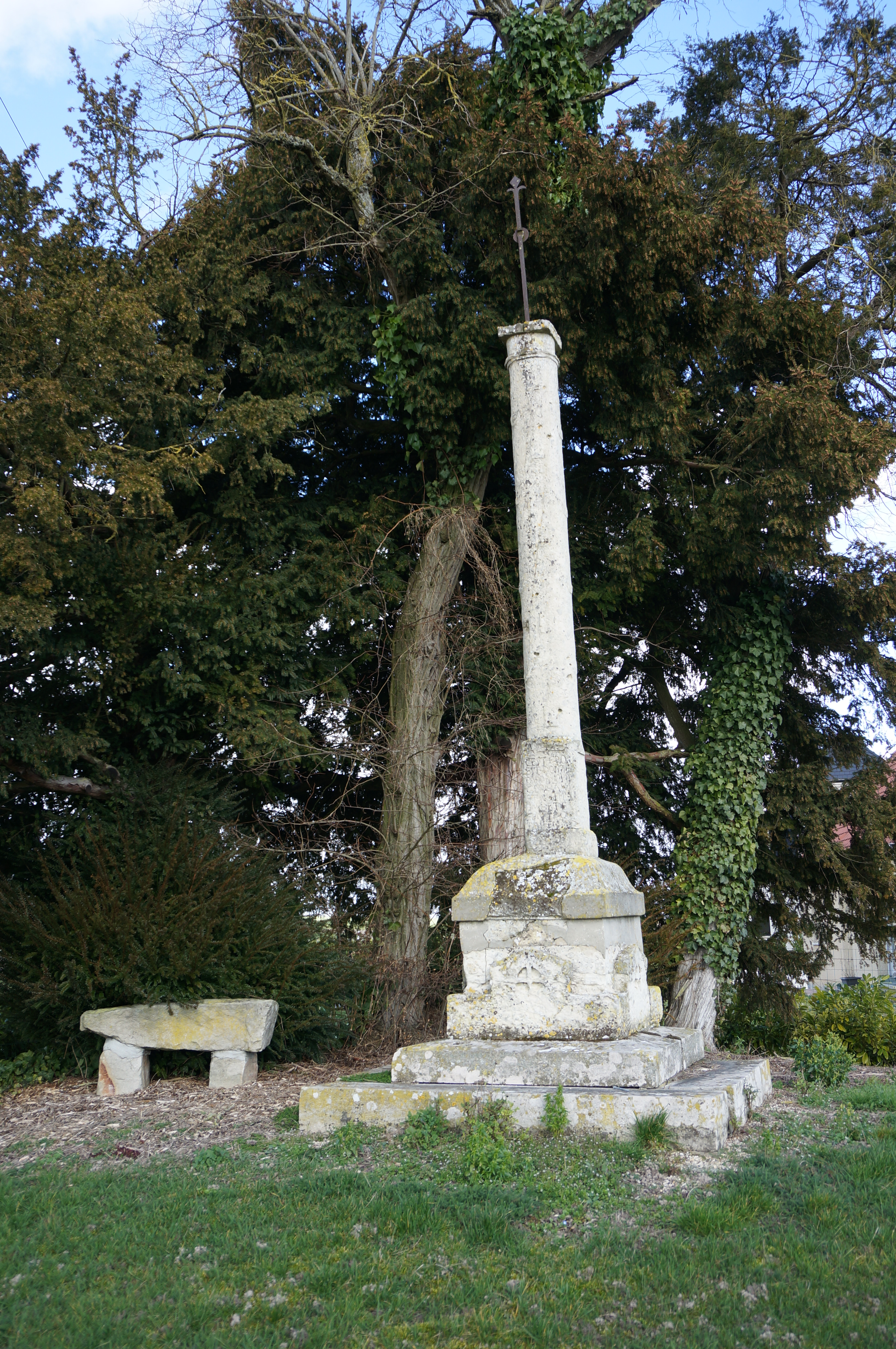
Amifontaine Cross

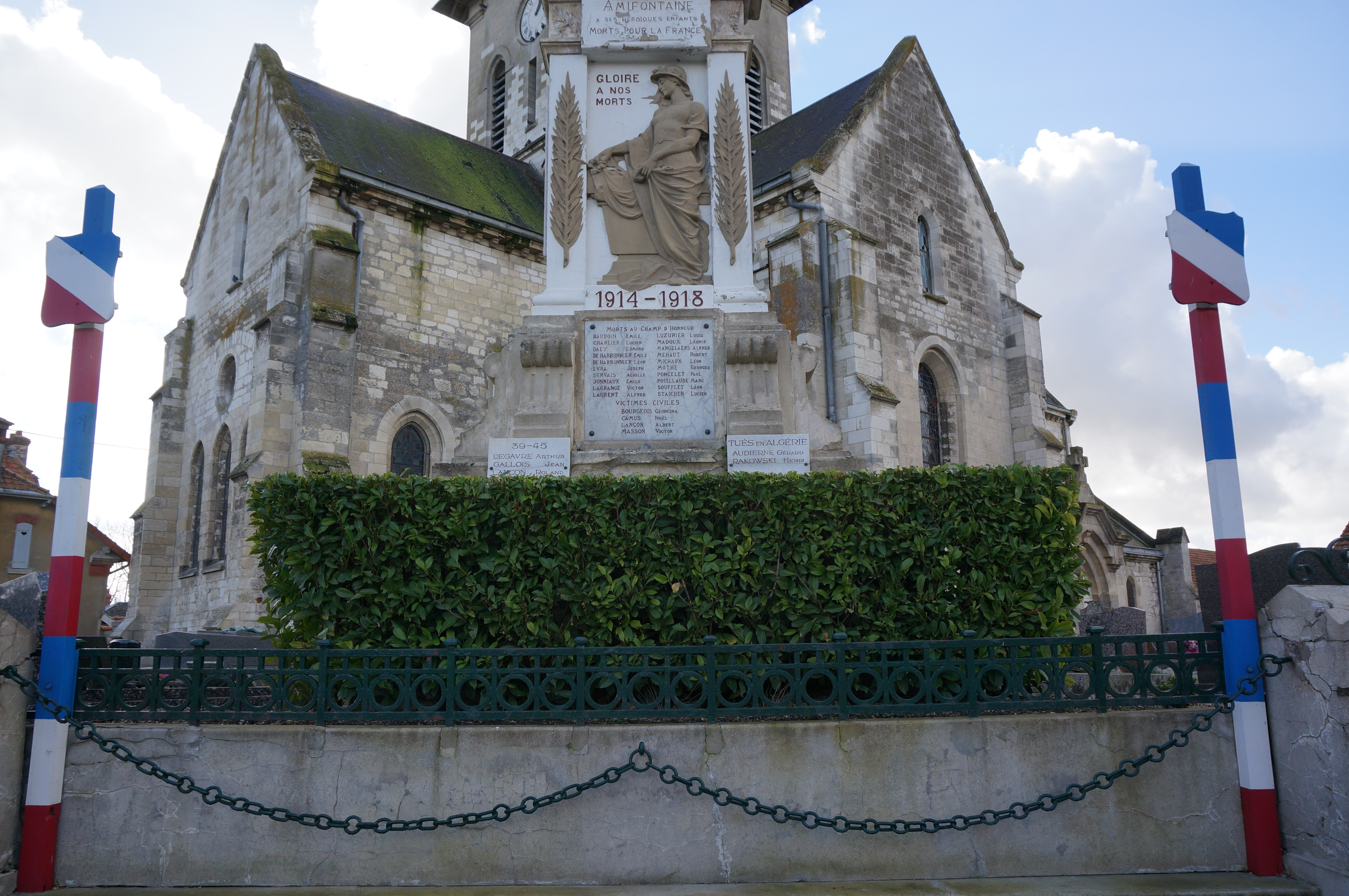
The War Memorial

== See also ==
- Communes of the Aisne department
