= Coucy-lès-Eppes =

- Commune
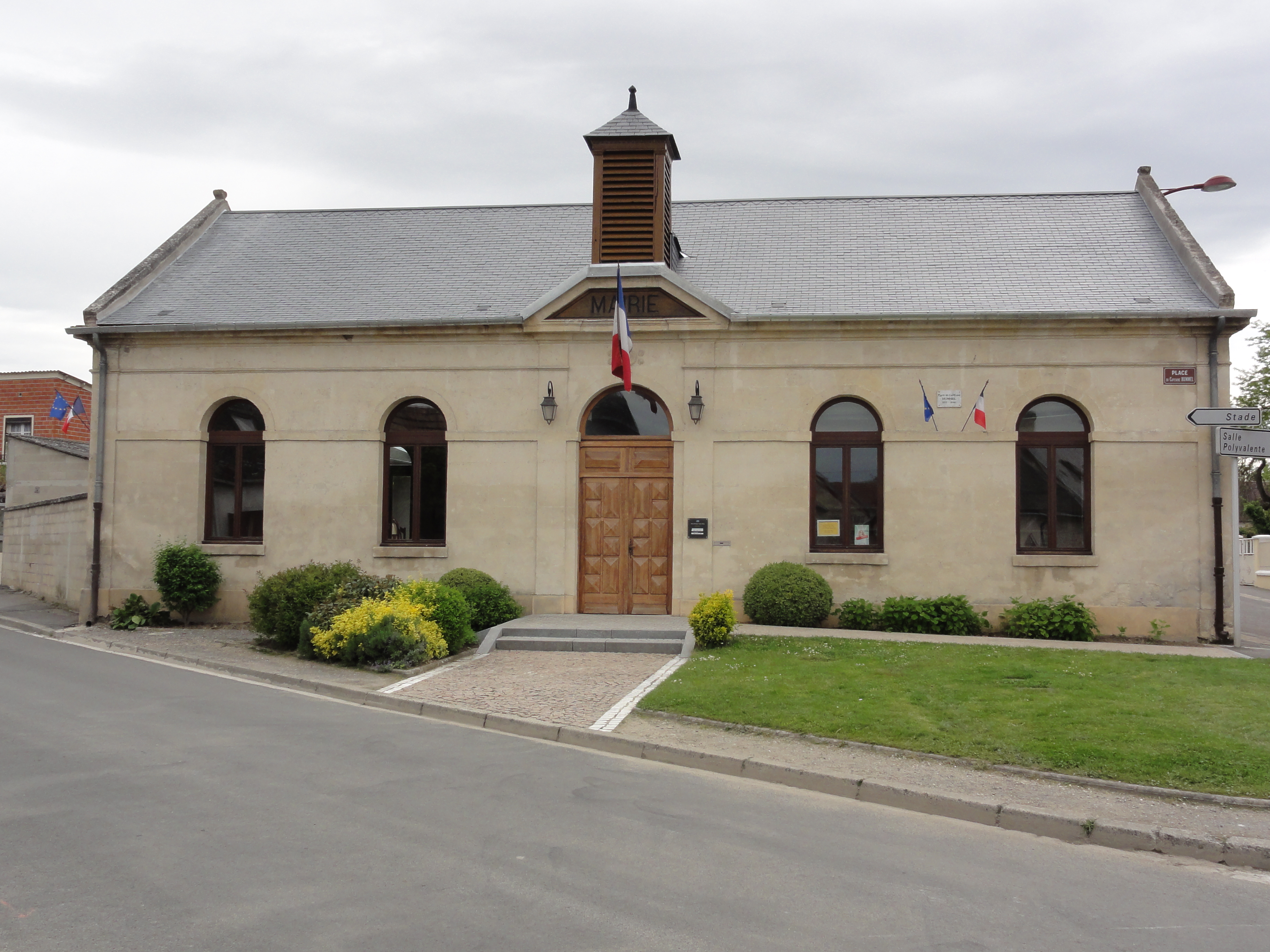
- The town hall of Coucy-lès-Eppes
- Location of Coucy-lès-Eppes
- Location within France Location within Hauts-de-France
- Coordinates: 49°33′09″N 3°46′12″E
- Country: France
- Region: Hauts-de-France
- Department: Aisne
- Arrondissement: Laon
- Canton: Villeneuve-sur-Aisne
- Intercommunality: Champagne Picarde

Government
  - Mayor (2026–32): Paolo Da Encarnaçao
- Area^{1}: 6.03 km^{2} (2.33 sq mi)
- Elevation: 100 m (330 ft)
- Highest elevation: 142 m (466 ft)
- Lowest elevation: 78 m (256 ft)
- Population (2023): 649
  - Density: 108/km^{2} (279/sq mi)
- Time zone: UTC+01:00 (CET)
  - Summer (DST): UTC+02:00 (CEST)
- INSEE/Postal code: 02218 /02840
- ^{1} French Land Register data, which excludes lakes, ponds, glaciers > 1 km^{2} (0.386 sq mi or 247 acres) and river estuaries.

Coucy-lès-Eppes is a commune in the Aisne department in Hauts-de-France in northern France. Coucy-lès-Eppes station has rail connections to Reims and Laon.

== Population ==
Historical population
Year	Pop.	±% p.a.
1968	555	—
1975	515	−1.06%
1982	642	+3.20%
1990	581	−1.24%
1999	612	+0.58%
2007	572	−0.84%
2012	597	+0.86%
2017	624	+0.89%
2023	649	+0.66%
Source: INSEE

== See also ==
- Communes of the Aisne department
