= Crépy-en-Valois station =

Railway station in Crépy-en-Valois, France

Coordinates: 49°13′53″N 2°53′17″E

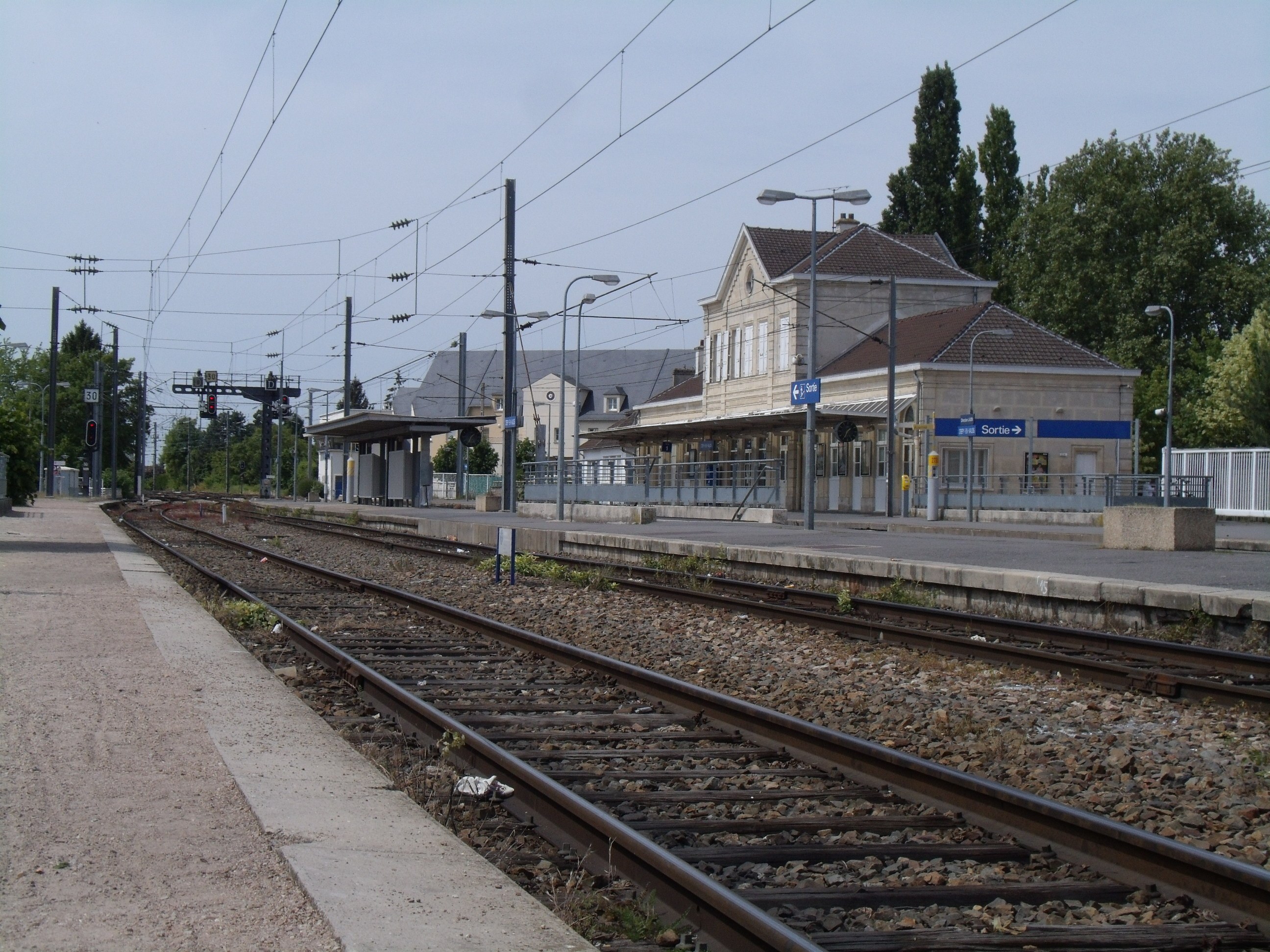
The station

Crépy-en-Valois is a railway station serving Crépy-en-Valois, Oise department, northern France. The station is served by regional trains to Paris, Soissons and Laon.

Preceding station	TER Hauts-de-France	Following station
Dammartin-Juilly-Saint-Mard towards Paris-Nord	Krono K15	Villers-Cotterêts towards Laon
Terminus	Proxi P15	Vaumoise towards Laon
Preceding station	Transilien	Following station
Ormoy-Villers towards Paris-Nord	Line K	Terminus
