= Villeneuve-sur-Aisne =

- Commune
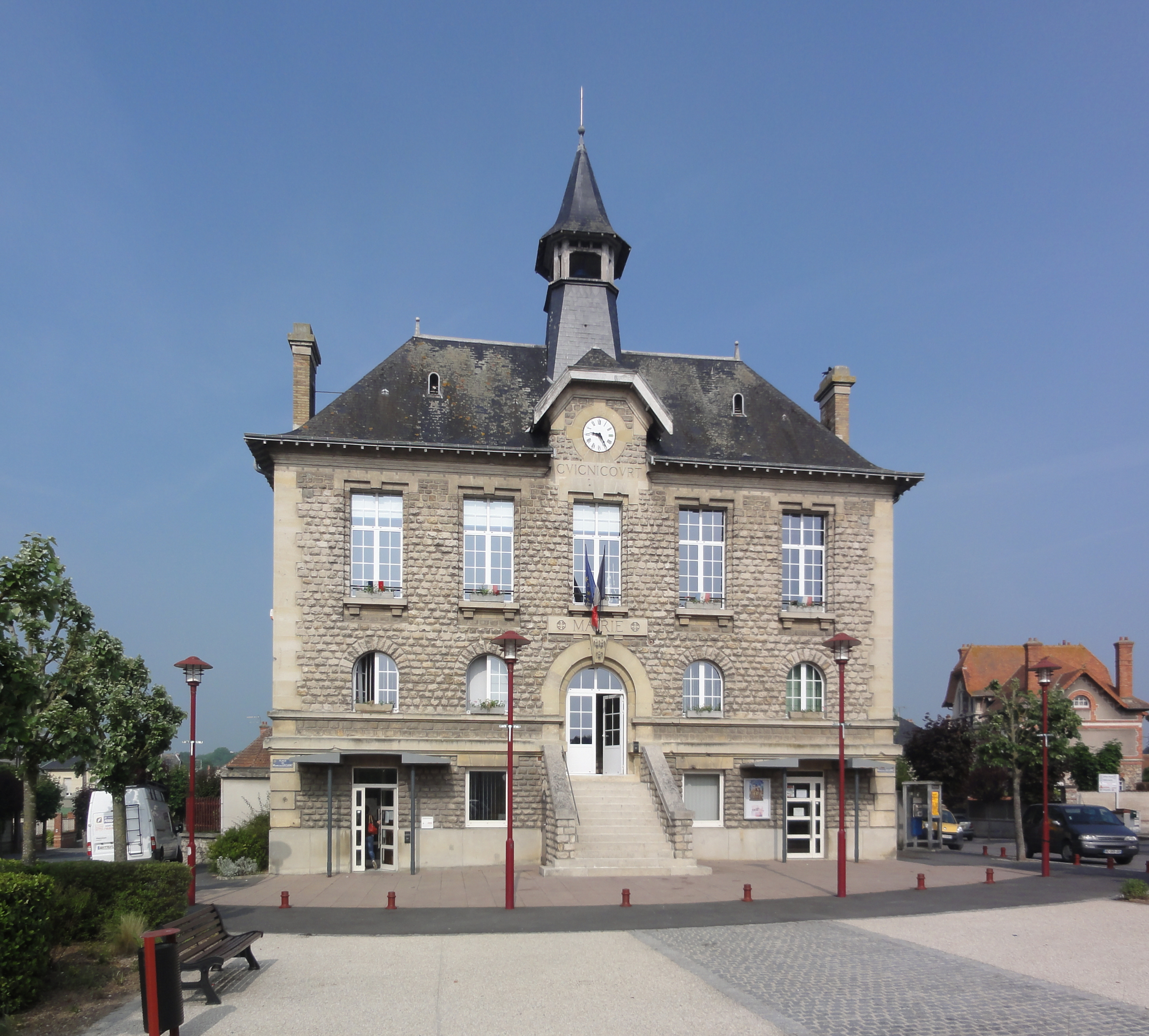
- Town hall
- Location of Villeneuve-sur-Aisne
- Location within France Location within Hauts-de-France
- Coordinates: 49°26′09″N 3°58′00″E
- Country: France
- Region: Hauts-de-France
- Department: Aisne
- Arrondissement: Laon
- Canton: Villeneuve-sur-Aisne
- Intercommunality: Champagne Picarde

Government
  - Mayor (2026–32): Philippe Timmerman
- Area^{1}: 25.03 km^{2} (9.66 sq mi)
- Elevation: 67 m (220 ft)
- Highest elevation: 142 m (466 ft)
- Lowest elevation: 51 m (167 ft)
- Population (2023): 2,792
  - Density: 111.5/km^{2} (288.9/sq mi)
- Time zone: UTC+01:00 (CET)
  - Summer (DST): UTC+02:00 (CEST)
- INSEE/Postal code: 02360 /02190
- ^{1} French Land Register data, which excludes lakes, ponds, glaciers > 1 km^{2} (0.386 sq mi or 247 acres) and river estuaries.

Villeneuve-sur-Aisne (French pronunciation: [vilnœv syʁ ɛːn]) is a commune in the Aisne department in Hauts-de-France in northern France. It is the result of the merger, on 1 January 2019, of the communes of Guignicourt and Menneville. Guignicourt station has rail connections to Reims and Laon.

== Population ==
Historical population
Year	Pop.	±% p.a.
1968	1,620	—
1975	2,152	+4.14%
1982	2,235	+0.54%
1990	2,260	+0.14%
1999	2,478	+1.03%
2007	2,531	+0.26%
2012	2,579	+0.38%
2017	2,704	+0.95%
2023	2,792	+0.54%
Populations of the area corresponding with the commune of Villeneuve-sur-Aisne at 1 January 2025. Source: INSEE

== See also ==
- Communes of the Aisne department
