= Menneville, Aisne =

Menneville
- Part of Villeneuve-sur-Aisne
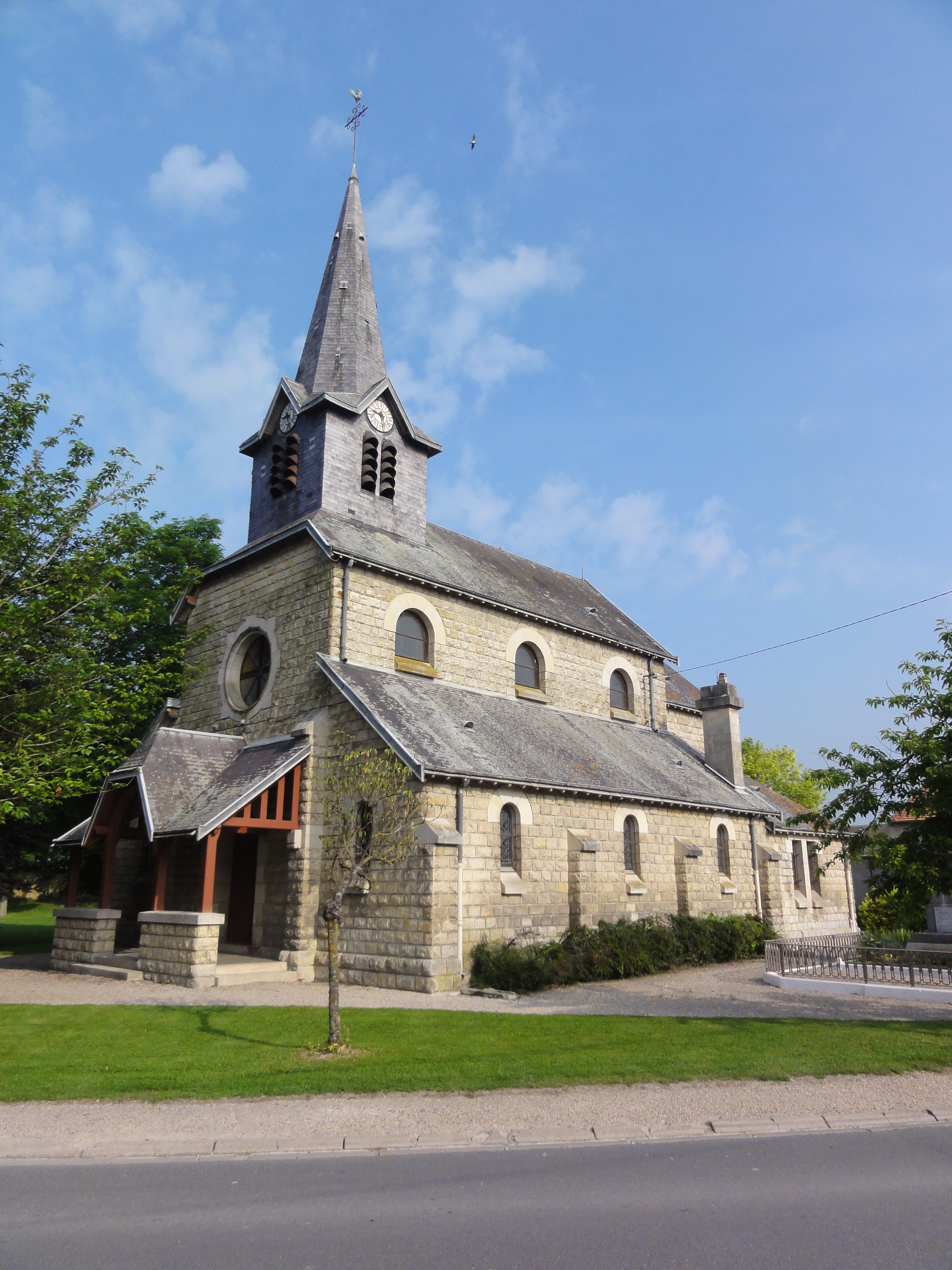
- The church of Menneville
- Location of Menneville
- Location within France Location within Hauts-de-France
- Coordinates: 49°25′12″N 4°00′29″E
- Country: France
- Region: Hauts-de-France
- Department: Aisne
- Arrondissement: Laon
- Canton: Villeneuve-sur-Aisne
- Commune: Villeneuve-sur-Aisne
- Area^{1}: 7.29 km^{2} (2.81 sq mi)
- Elevation: 60 m (200 ft)
- Highest elevation: 129 m (423 ft)
- Lowest elevation: 54 m (177 ft)
- Population (2021): 516
  - Density: 70.8/km^{2} (183/sq mi)
- Time zone: UTC+01:00 (CET)
  - Summer (DST): UTC+02:00 (CEST)
- Postal code: 02190
- ^{1} French Land Register data, which excludes lakes, ponds, glaciers > 1 km^{2} (0.386 sq mi or 247 acres) and river estuaries.

Menneville (French pronunciation: [mɛnvil]) is a former commune in the Aisne department in Hauts-de-France in northern France. On 1 January 2019, it was merged into the new commune of Villeneuve-sur-Aisne.

== See also ==
- Communes of the Aisne department
