= Loivre =

- Commune
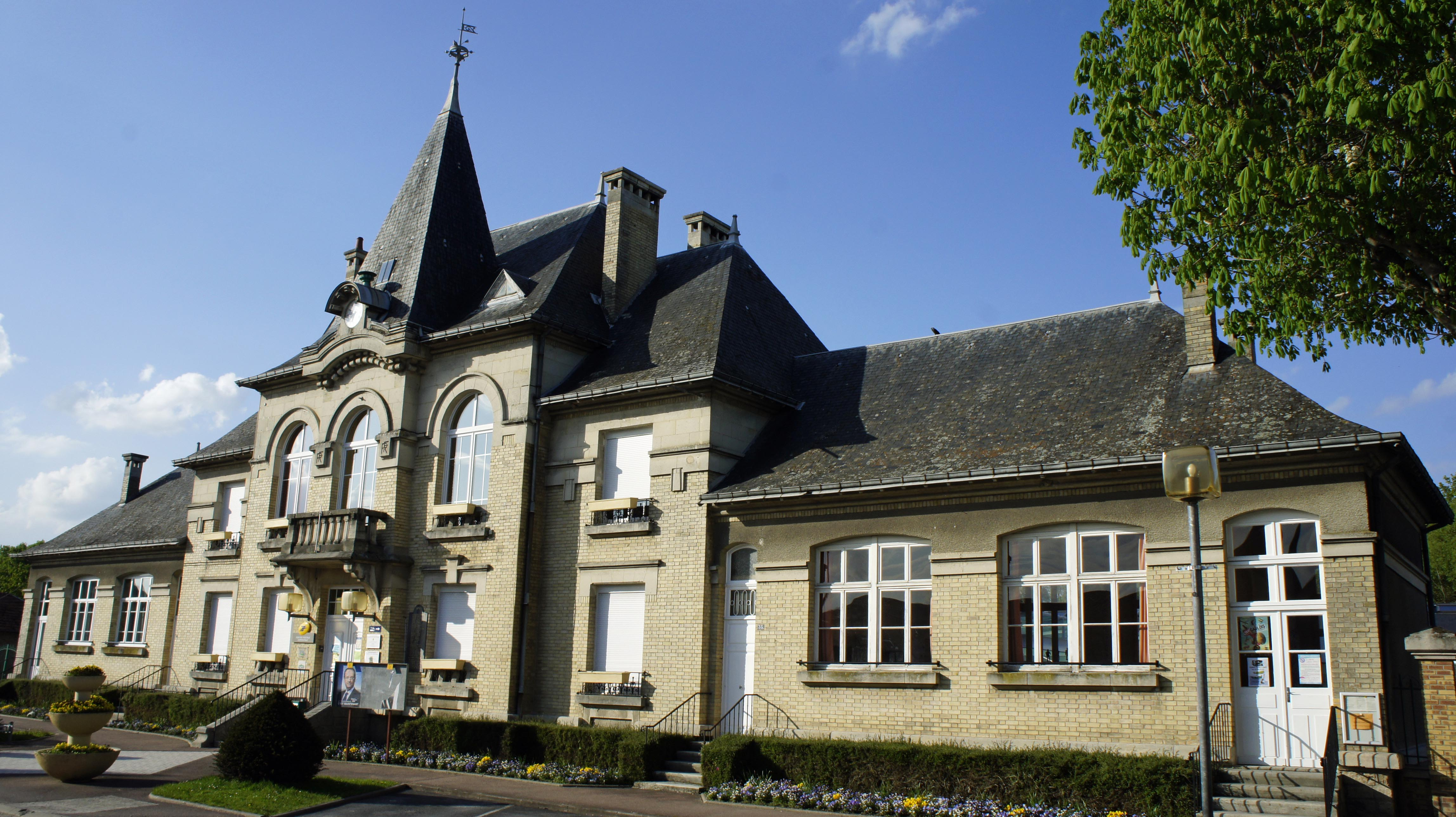
- The town hall in Loivre
- Location of Loivre
- Location within France Location within Grand Est
- Coordinates: 49°20′49″N 3°58′50″E
- Country: France
- Region: Grand Est
- Department: Marne
- Arrondissement: Reims
- Canton: Bourgogne-Fresne
- Intercommunality: CU Grand Reims

Government
  - Mayor (2020–2026): Claudine Rousseaux
- Area^{1}: 10.24 km^{2} (3.95 sq mi)
- Elevation: 80 m (260 ft)
- Highest elevation: 116 m (381 ft)
- Lowest elevation: 63 m (207 ft)
- Population (2023): 1,442
  - Density: 140.8/km^{2} (364.7/sq mi)
- Time zone: UTC+01:00 (CET)
  - Summer (DST): UTC+02:00 (CEST)
- INSEE/Postal code: 51329 /51220
- ^{1} French Land Register data, which excludes lakes, ponds, glaciers > 1 km^{2} (0.386 sq mi or 247 acres) and river estuaries.

Loivre (French pronunciation: [lwavʁ]) is a commune in the Marne department in north-eastern France. Loivre station has rail connections to Reims and Laon.

== Administration ==
=== Communal governance ===
The commune is governed by the Mayor and a Municipal Council composed of fourteen members.

List of successive Mayors of Loivre
In office		Name	Party	Notes	Ref.
March 2001	3 December 2014	Michel Guillou		Resigned	
3 December 2014	present	Claudine Rousseaux		re-elected in 2020	

=== Intercommunal governance ===
Since 1 January 2017, the commune has been part of the Communauté urbaine du Grand Reims, which provides integrated communal services to both Reims and the surrounding area. Prior to 2017, the commune was part of the Communauté de communes de la Colline from 23 December 1994 until 1 January 2014, and the Communauté de communes du Nord Champenois between 2014 and 2017.

== See also ==
- Communes of the Marne department
