= Variscourt =

- Commune
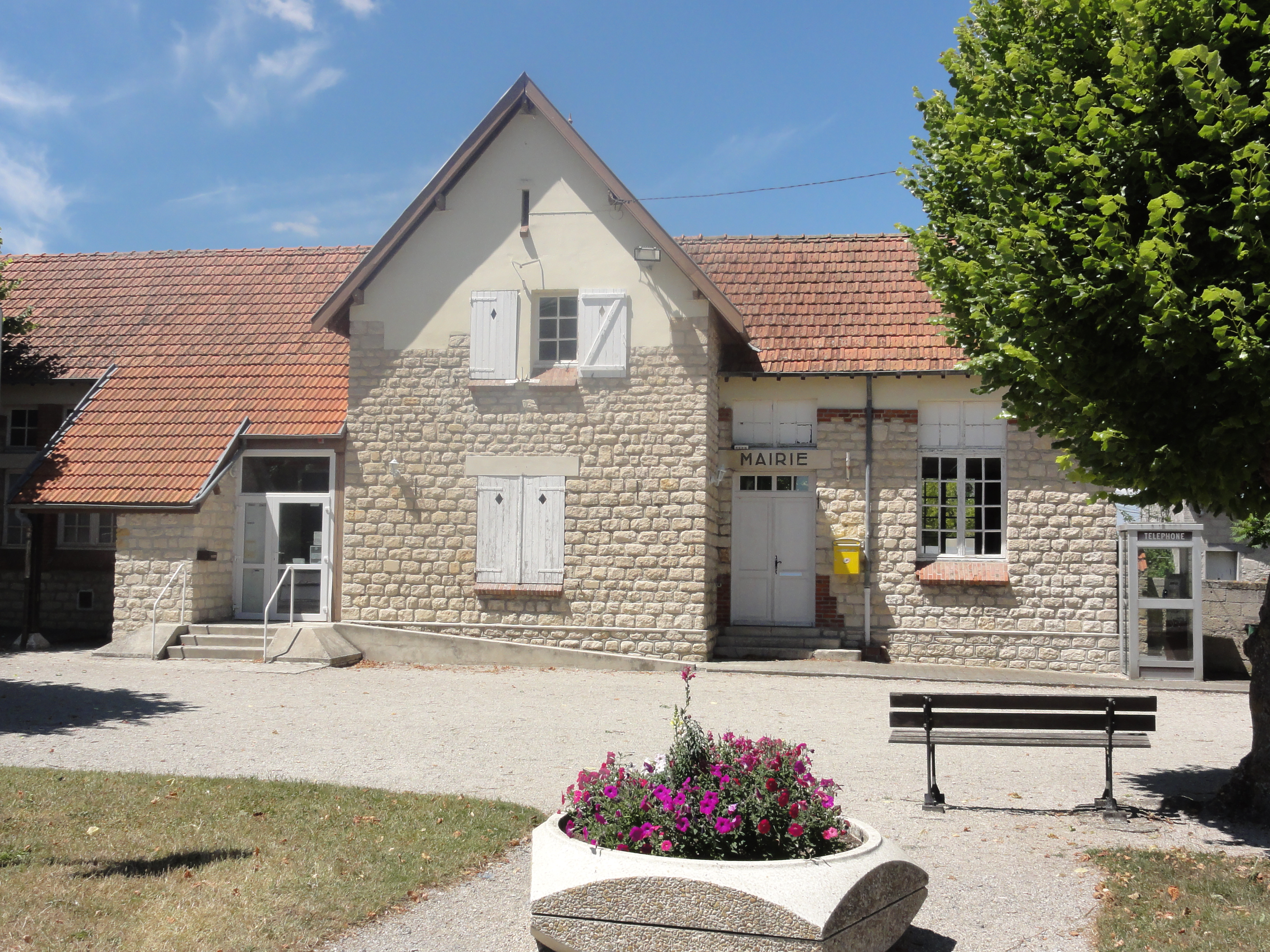
- The town hall of Variscourt
- Location of Variscourt
- Location within France Location within Hauts-de-France
- Coordinates: 49°25′07″N 3°59′11″E
- Country: France
- Region: Hauts-de-France
- Department: Aisne
- Arrondissement: Laon
- Canton: Villeneuve-sur-Aisne
- Intercommunality: Champagne Picarde

Government
  - Mayor (2026–32): Cédric Terrassin
- Area^{1}: 5.56 km^{2} (2.15 sq mi)
- Elevation: 38 m (125 ft)
- Highest elevation: 80 m (260 ft)
- Lowest elevation: 54 m (177 ft)
- Population (2023): 217
  - Density: 39.0/km^{2} (101/sq mi)
- Time zone: UTC+01:00 (CET)
  - Summer (DST): UTC+02:00 (CEST)
- INSEE/Postal code: 02761 /02190
- ^{1} French Land Register data, which excludes lakes, ponds, glaciers > 1 km^{2} (0.386 sq mi or 247 acres) and river estuaries.

Variscourt is a commune in the Aisne department in Hauts-de-France in northern France.

== Geography ==
The commune is traversed by the river Suippe. Aguilcourt—Variscourt halt has rail connections to Reims and Laon.

== Politics and administration ==
=== Municipal administration ===
List of successive mayors of Variscourt
In office		Mayor	Party	Notes
2001	2014	Georges Andre	DVD	
2014	present	Cédric Terrassin	Independent	

== Population ==
Historical population
Year	Pop.	±% p.a.
1968	86	—
1975	75	−1.94%
1982	76	+0.19%
1990	110	+4.73%
1999	109	−0.10%
2007	201	+7.95%
2012	210	+0.88%
2017	197	−1.27%
2023	217	+1.62%
Source: INSEE

== See also ==
- Communes of the Aisne department
