= Guignicourt =

- Part of Villeneuve-sur-Aisne
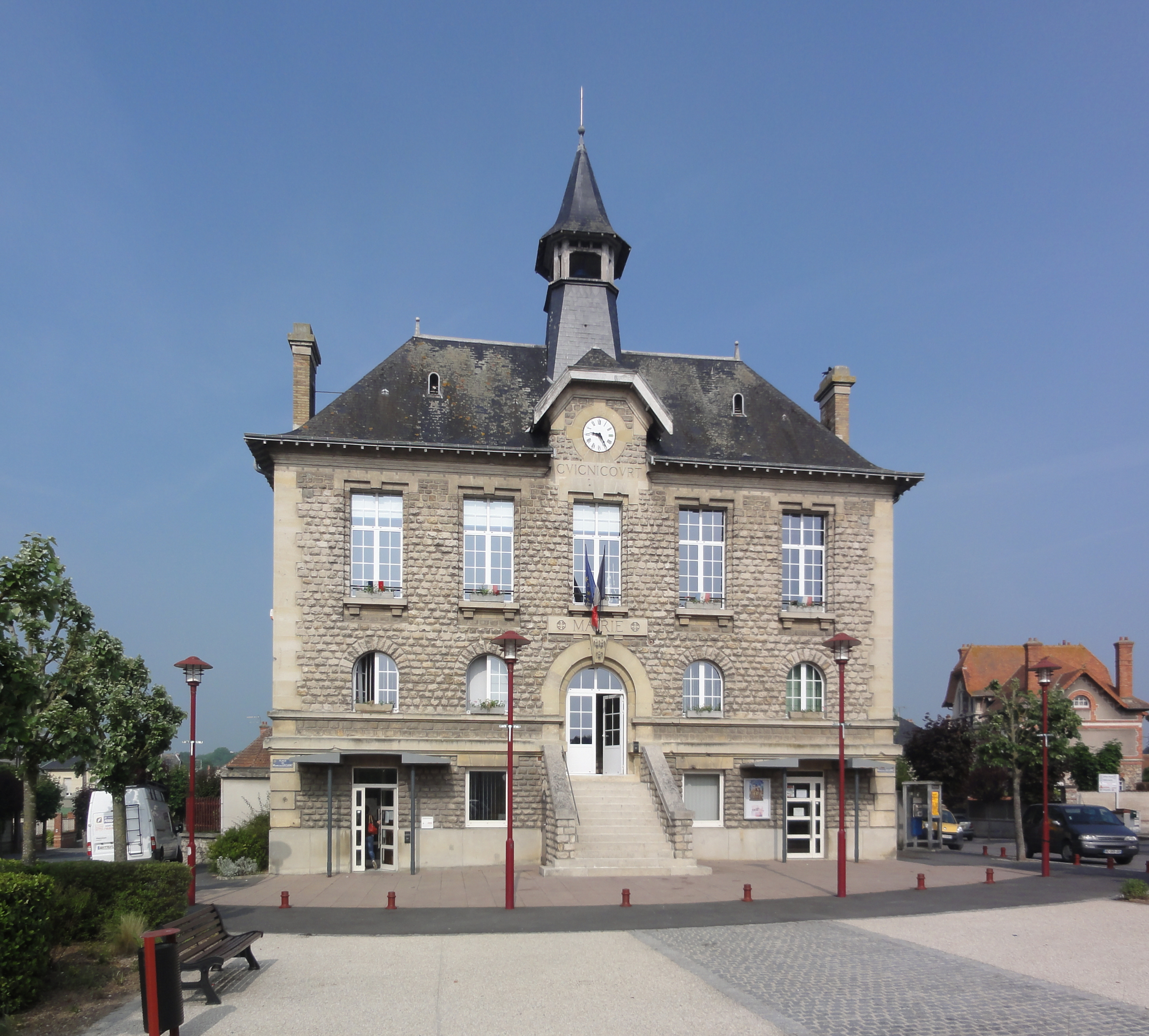
- Town hall

- Coat of arms
- Location of Guignicourt
- Location within France Location within Hauts-de-France
- Coordinates: 49°26′09″N 3°58′00″E
- Country: France
- Region: Hauts-de-France
- Department: Aisne
- Arrondissement: Laon
- Canton: Villeneuve-sur-Aisne
- Commune: Villeneuve-sur-Aisne
- Area^{1}: 17.74 km^{2} (6.85 sq mi)
- Elevation: 67 m (220 ft)
- Highest elevation: 142 m (466 ft)
- Lowest elevation: 51 m (167 ft)
- Population (2021): 2,268
  - Density: 127.8/km^{2} (331.1/sq mi)
- Time zone: UTC+01:00 (CET)
  - Summer (DST): UTC+02:00 (CEST)
- Postal code: 02190
- ^{1} French Land Register data, which excludes lakes, ponds, glaciers > 1 km^{2} (0.386 sq mi or 247 acres) and river estuaries.

Guignicourt (French pronunciation: [ɡiɲikuʁ]) is a former commune in the Aisne department in Hauts-de-France in northern France. On 1 January 2019, it was merged into the new commune of Villeneuve-sur-Aisne.

== Population ==
Historical population
Year	Pop.	±% p.a.
1962	1,312	—
1968	1,411	+1.22%
1975	1,917	+4.48%
1982	2,002	+0.62%
1990	2,008	+0.04%
1999	2,203	+1.04%
2021	2,268	+0.13%
Source: EHESS and INSEE

== See also ==
- Communes of the Aisne department
