= Courcy, Marne =

Courcy
- Commune
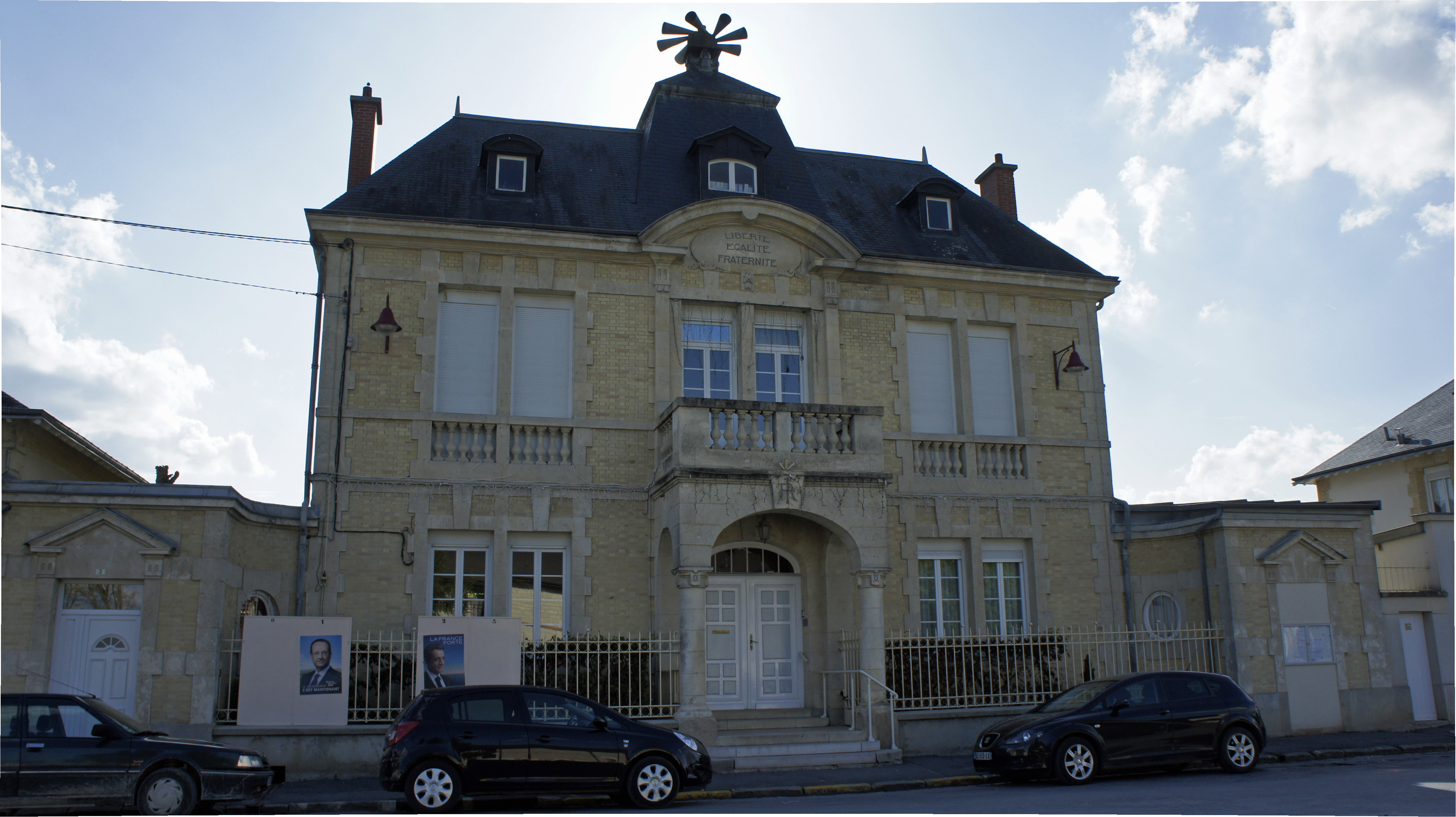
- The town hall in Courcy
- Location of Courcy
- Location within France Location within Grand Est
- Coordinates: 49°19′26″N 4°00′12″E
- Country: France
- Region: Grand Est
- Department: Marne
- Arrondissement: Reims
- Canton: Bourgogne-Fresne
- Intercommunality: CU Grand Reims

Government
  - Mayor (2020–2026): Martine Jolly
- Area^{1}: 15.5 km^{2} (6.0 sq mi)
- Elevation: 78 m (256 ft)
- Highest elevation: 161 m (528 ft)
- Lowest elevation: 75 m (246 ft)
- Population (2023): 1,240
  - Density: 80.0/km^{2} (207/sq mi)
- Time zone: UTC+01:00 (CET)
  - Summer (DST): UTC+02:00 (CEST)
- INSEE/Postal code: 51183 /51220
- ^{1} French Land Register data, which excludes lakes, ponds, glaciers > 1 km^{2} (0.386 sq mi or 247 acres) and river estuaries.

Courcy (French pronunciation: [kuʁsi]) is a commune in the Marne department in north-eastern France. Courcy-Brimont station has rail connections to Reims and Laon.

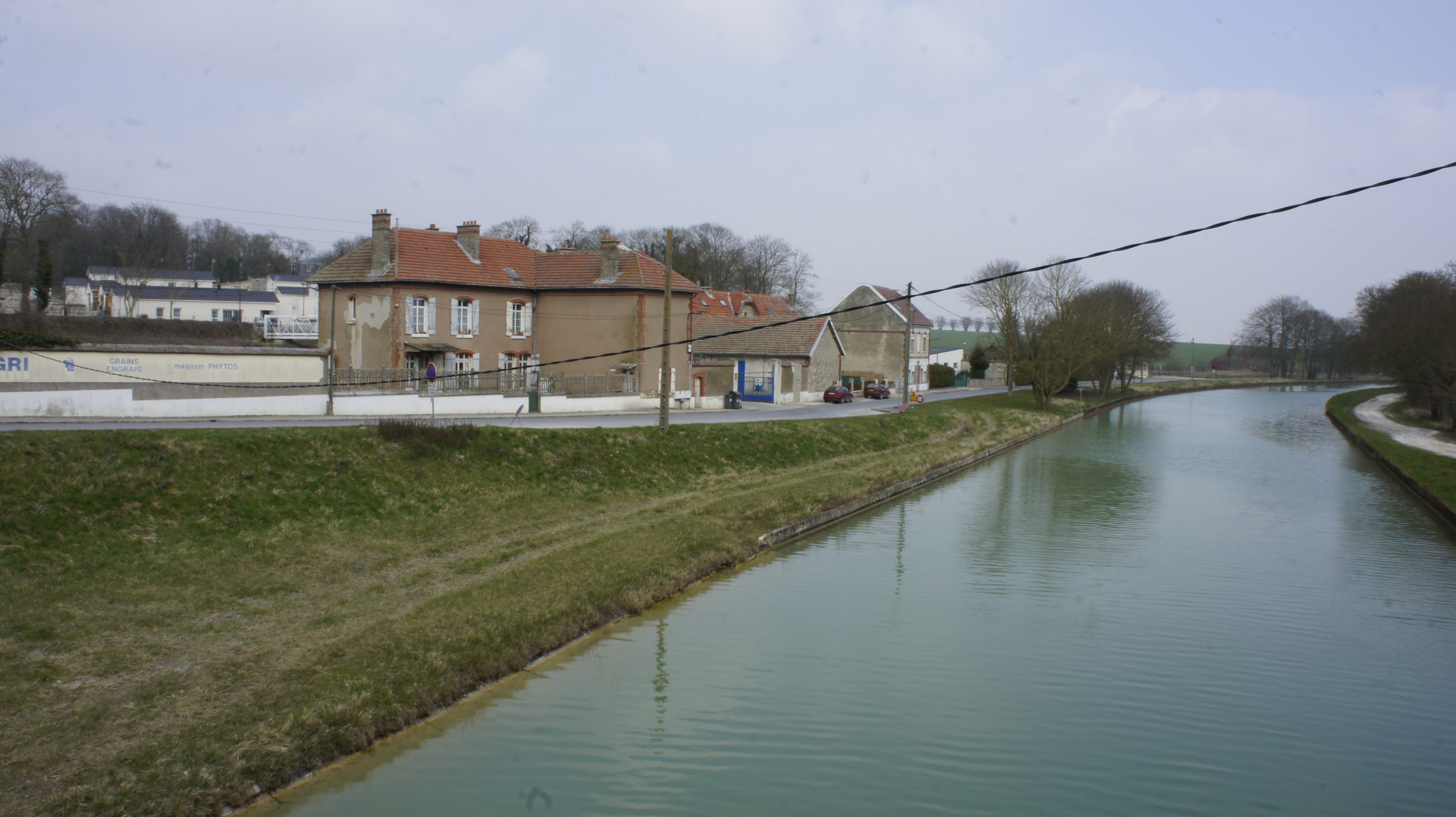

== History ==
Courcy was a contested village during the First World War. During the Second Battle of the Aisne the Russian Expeditionary Force in France captured the village on 16 April 1917.

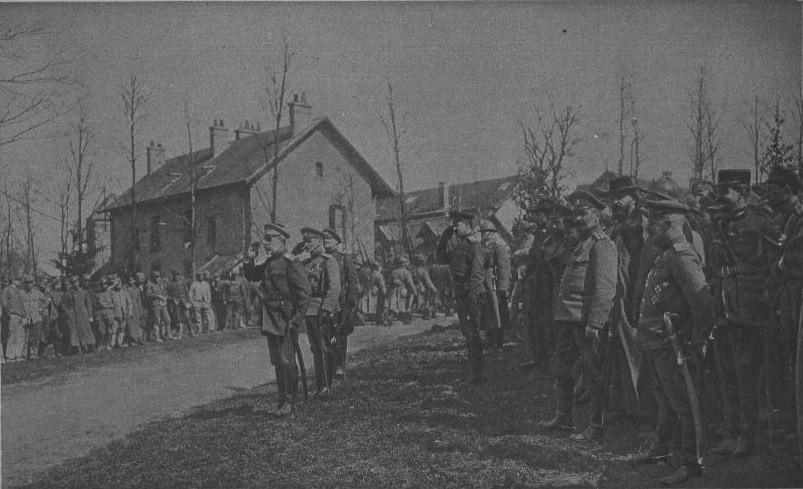
Generals Nikolai Aleksandrovich Lokhvitsky and Fyodor Fyodorovich Palitzin inspecting the Russian soldiers at Courcy, 13 May 1917

== See also ==
- Communes of the Marne department
