= Saint-Erme-Outre-et-Ramecourt =

- Commune
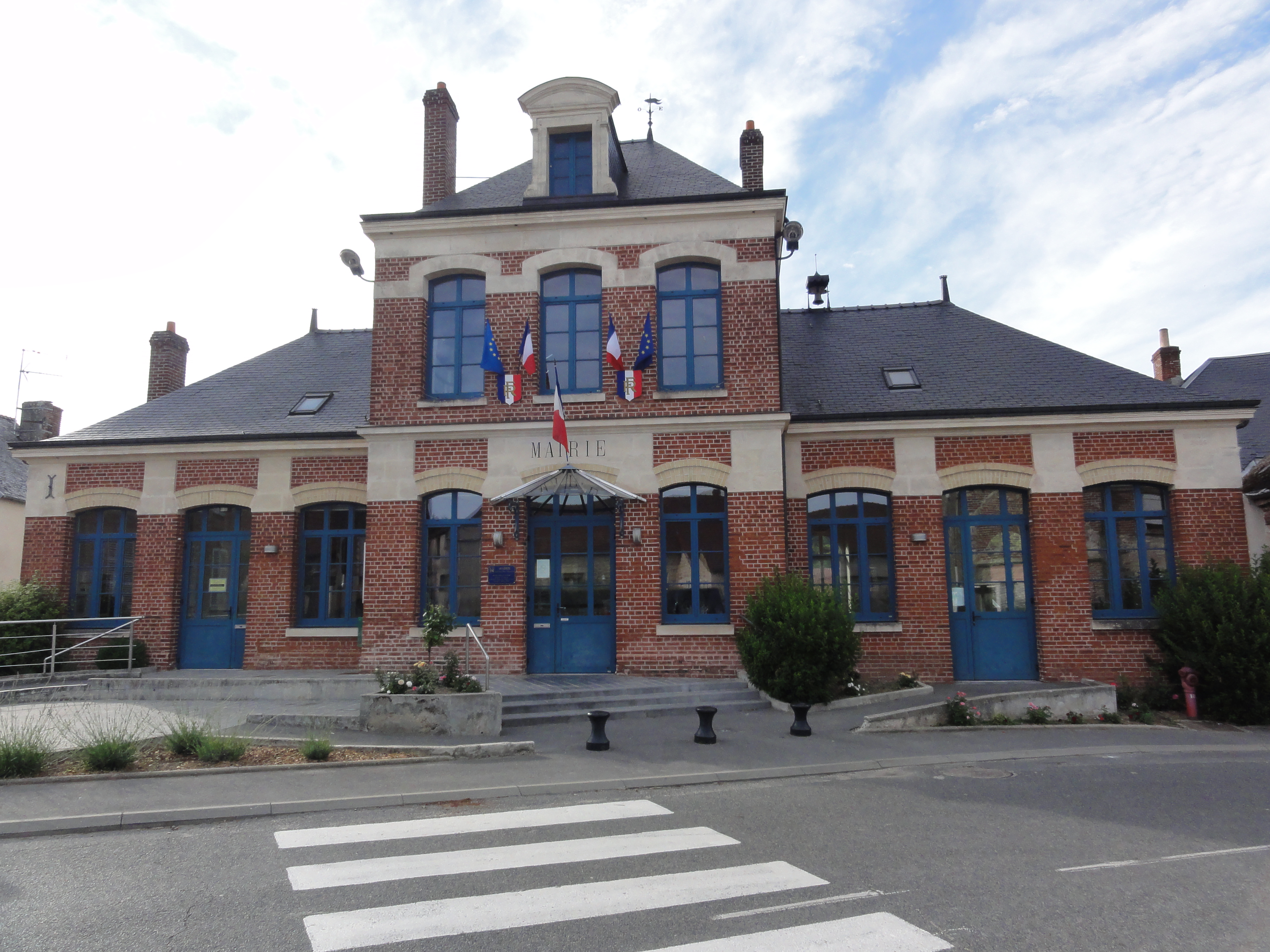
- The town hall of Saint-Erme-Outre-et-Ramecourt

- Coat of arms
- Location of Saint-Erme-Outre-et-Ramecourt
- Location within France Location within Hauts-de-France
- Coordinates: 49°30′56″N 3°50′25″E
- Country: France
- Region: Hauts-de-France
- Department: Aisne
- Arrondissement: Laon
- Canton: Villeneuve-sur-Aisne
- Intercommunality: Champagne Picarde

Government
  - Mayor (2026–32): Alexis Thirault
- Area^{1}: 20.11 km^{2} (7.76 sq mi)
- Elevation: 100 m (330 ft)
- Highest elevation: 208 m (682 ft)
- Lowest elevation: 75 m (246 ft)
- Population (2023): 1,697
  - Density: 84.39/km^{2} (218.6/sq mi)
- Time zone: UTC+01:00 (CET)
  - Summer (DST): UTC+02:00 (CEST)
- INSEE/Postal code: 02676 /02820
- ^{1} French Land Register data, which excludes lakes, ponds, glaciers > 1 km^{2} (0.386 sq mi or 247 acres) and river estuaries.

Saint-Erme-Outre-et-Ramecourt (French pronunciation: [sɛ̃.t‿ɛʁm utʁ e ʁamkuʁ]) is a commune in the Aisne department in Hauts-de-France in northern France. Saint-Erme station has rail connections to Reims and Laon.

== Population ==
Historical population
Year	Pop.	±% p.a.
1968	1,578	—
1975	1,791	+1.83%
1982	1,818	+0.21%
1990	1,867	+0.33%
1999	1,861	−0.04%
2007	1,821	−0.27%
2012	1,867	+0.50%
2017	1,726	−1.56%
2023	1,697	−0.28%
Source: INSEE

== See also ==
- Communes of the Aisne department
