= Reims station =

Railway station in France

Coordinates: 49°15′33″N 4°01′27″E

Reims
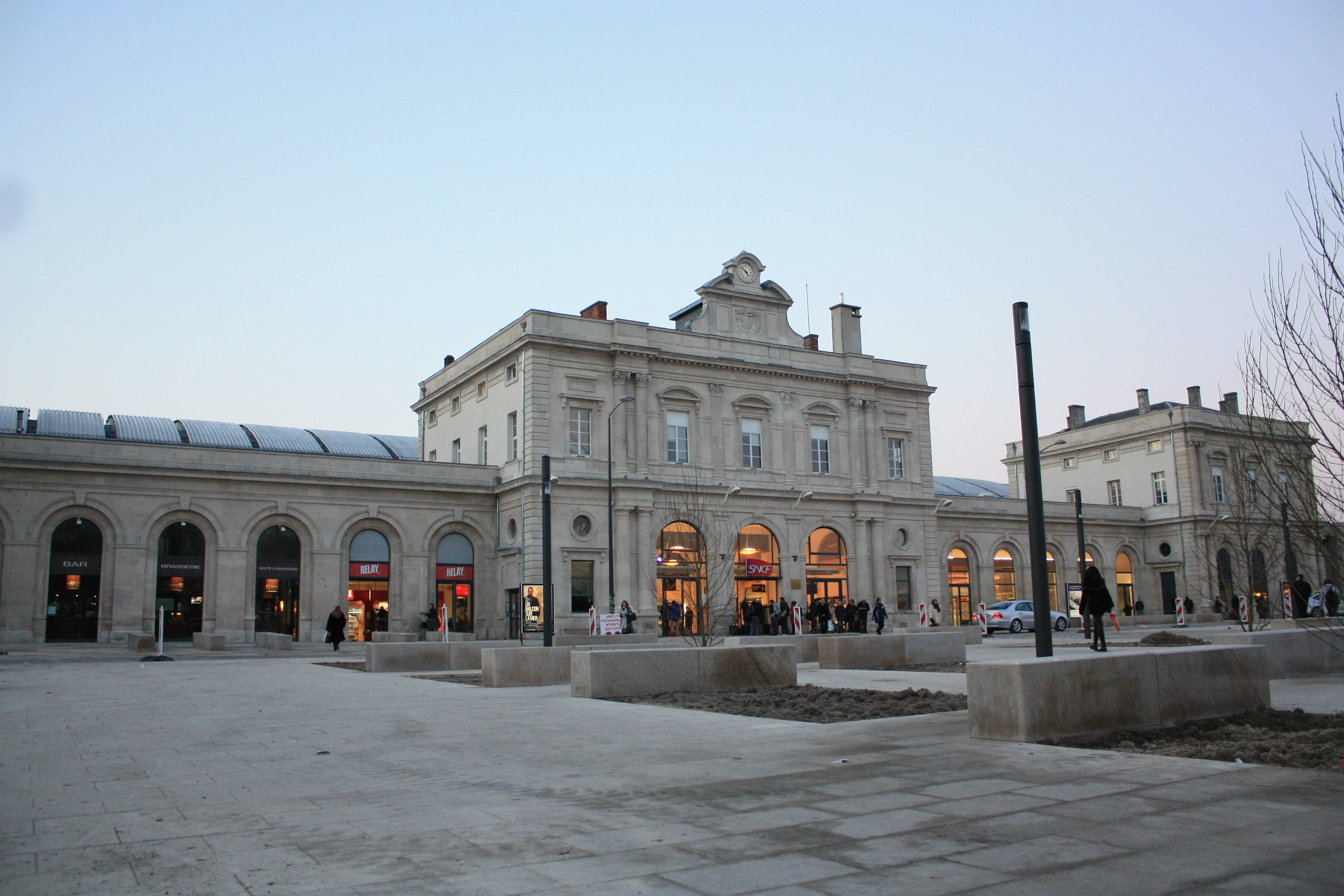

General information
- Location: Esplanade François Mitterrand; 51100 Reims; Marne, France
- Elevation: 84 m (276 ft)
- Owner: SNCF
- Operator: SNCF
- Lines: Épernay–Reims railway Reims–Laon railway Soissons–Givet railway Châlons-en-Champagne–Reims-Cérès railway
- Platforms: 4
- Tracks: 8
- Connections: Citura

Construction
- Architect: Félix Langlais

Other information
- Station code: 87171009
- Website: Official Website (in French)

Key dates
- Opened: 10 June 1858

Passengers
- 2024: 5,003,397

Services
Preceding station	SNCF	Following station
Paris-Est Terminus	TGV inOui	Rethel towards Sedan
Preceding station	TER Grand Est	Following station
Champagne-Ardenne TGV Terminus	C01	Bazancourt towards Sedan
Terminus	C06	Prunay towards Dijon
Franchet d'Esperey towards Épernay or Champagne-Ardenne TGV	C09	Terminus
Courcy–Brimont towards Laon	C10	Terminus
Muizon towards Fismes	C11	Terminus
Location

Reims station (French: Gare de Reims) is the main railway station in the city of Reims, Marne department, northern France.

Since 16 September 2011, the train shed is labelled "20th century heritage".

The station was opened in 1858 by the "Compagnie des chemins de fer des Ardennes" (lit. 'Ardennes's Railway Company').

Services are provided by SNCF under its branded TGV inOui and TER Grand Est network.

== Services ==
=== TGV inOui ===
Since the opening of the East European High Speed Line on 10 June 2007, Reims station has benefited from direct TGV toward Paris with a travel time of 45 minutes.

=== TER Fluo Grand Est ===
The station is served by several lines as below:

- Reims – Châlons-en-Champagne (Saint-Dizier – Chaumont – Culmont-Chalindrey and Dijon-Ville)
- Reims – Épernay (Châlons-en-Champagne – Vitry-le-François – Bar-le-Duc – Toul – Nancy-Ville – Lunéville on Sunday)
- Reims – Fismes
- Reims – Laon
- Champagne-Ardenne TGV – Reims – Charleville-Mézières – Sedan.

== See also ==
- List of SNCF stations in Grand Est
