= Laon station =

French railway station

Laon
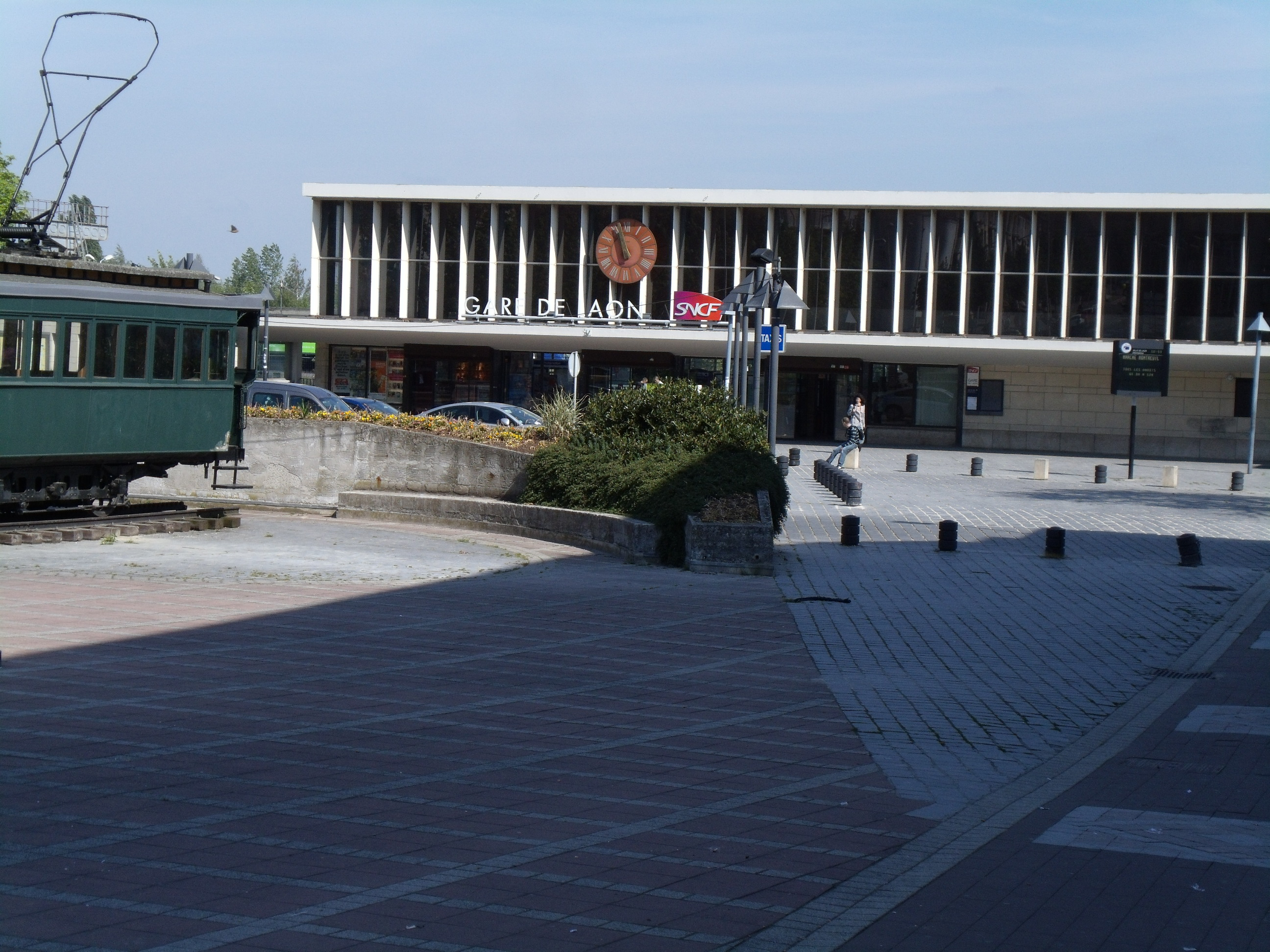
- Entrance to the station

General information
- Location: Place des droits de l'Homme; 02000 Laon
- Coordinates: 49.57061667°N 3.624211111°E
- Owner: SNCF
- Line: Reims–Laon railway

Other information
- Station code: 87296012

Services
| Preceding station | TER Hauts-de-France | Following station |
|---|---|---|
| Soissons towards Paris-Nord | Krono K15 | Terminus |
| Clacy-Mons towards Crépy-en-Valois | Proxi P15 | Terminus |
| Crépy-Couvron towards Amiens | Proxi P20 | Terminus |
| Barenton-Bugny towards Aulnoye-Aymeries | Proxi P64 | Terminus |
| Preceding station | TER Grand Est | Following station |
| Terminus | C10 | Coucy-lès-Eppes towards Reims |
Location

Laon is a railway station serving the town of Laon, Aisne department, northern France. It was built in 1857 by Chemins de Fer du Nord. The station is served by regional trains to Paris, Amiens, Aulnoye-Aymeries and Reims.

== History ==
Chemins de Fer du Nord operates the station at the opening of the line section in Laon on September 1, 1853. It opens the section of Villers-Cotterets in Laon on June 2, 1862.

In 2016, according to SNCF estimates, the station's annual attendance is 777,328 passengers, after 805,082 travelers in 2015 and 842,067 travelers in 2014.

A parking for vehicles is arranged around the station.

The station in the 1920s

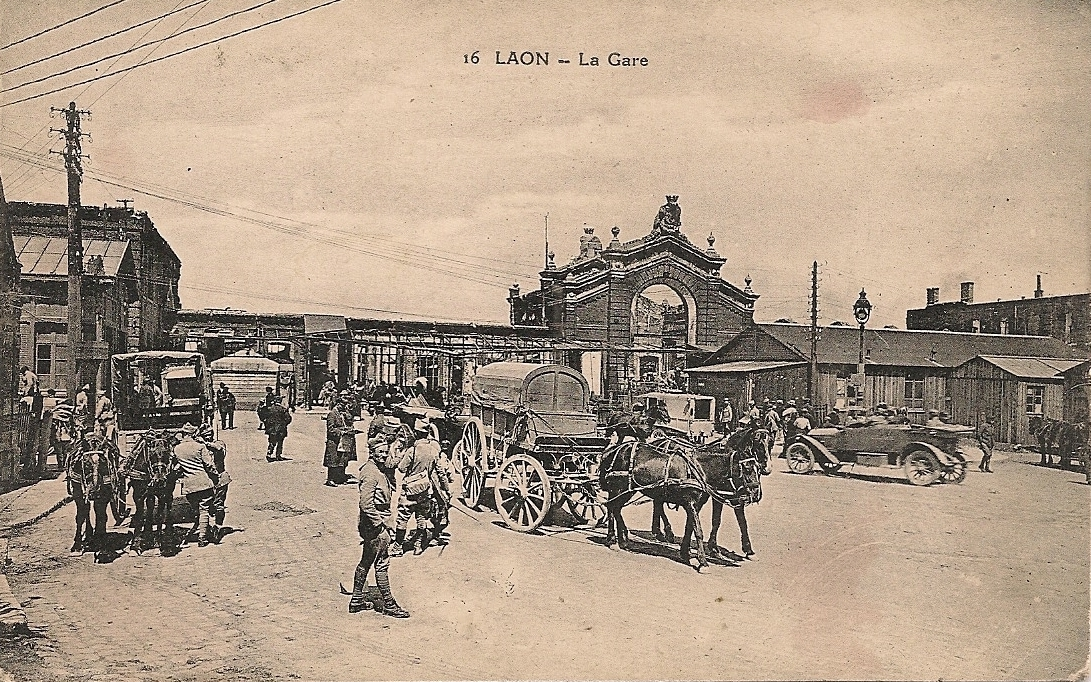
The station around 1920.

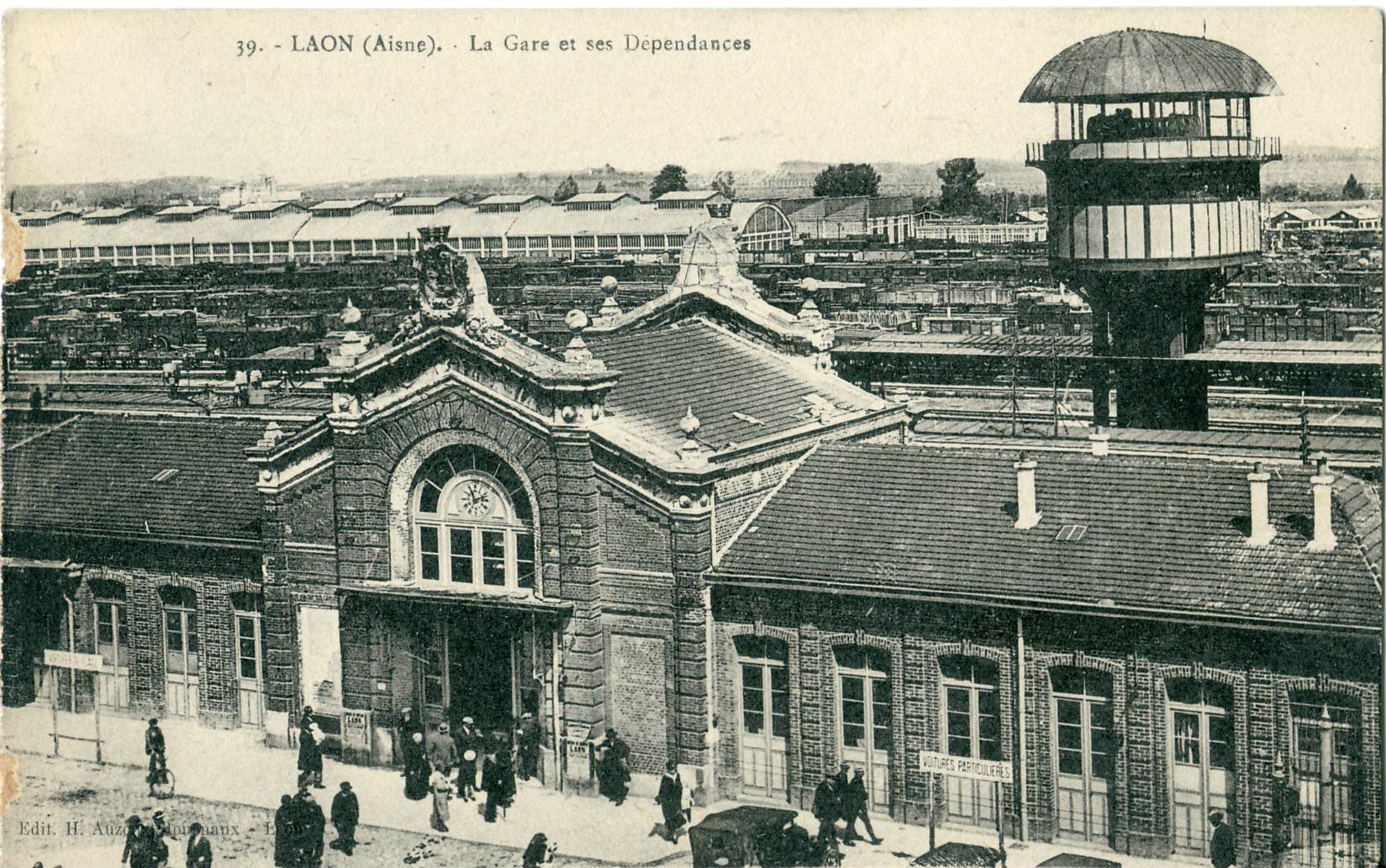
The station around 1925.

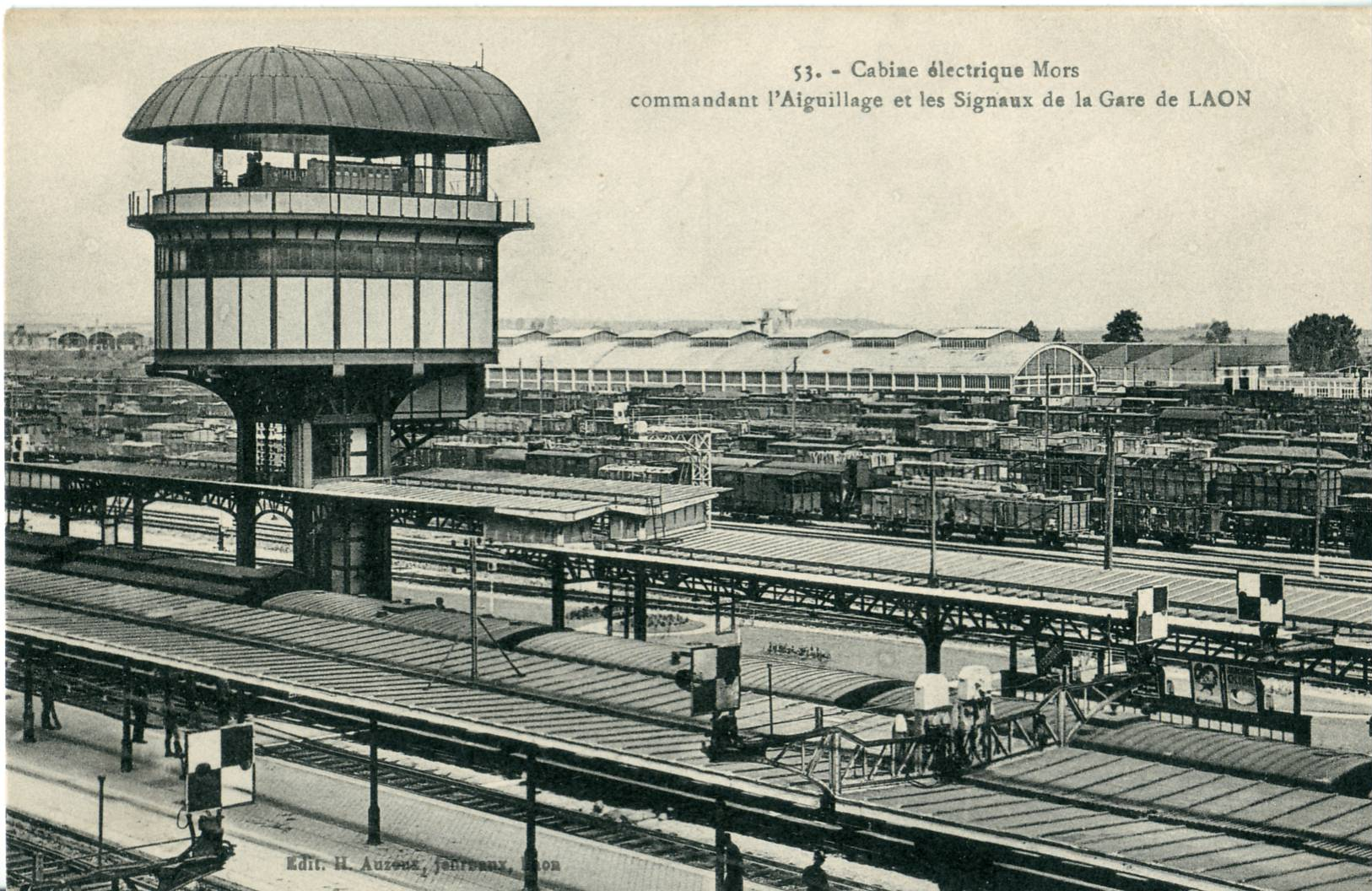
The station around 1928.
