= Ailly-sur-Somme station =

French railway station

Ailly-sur-Somme
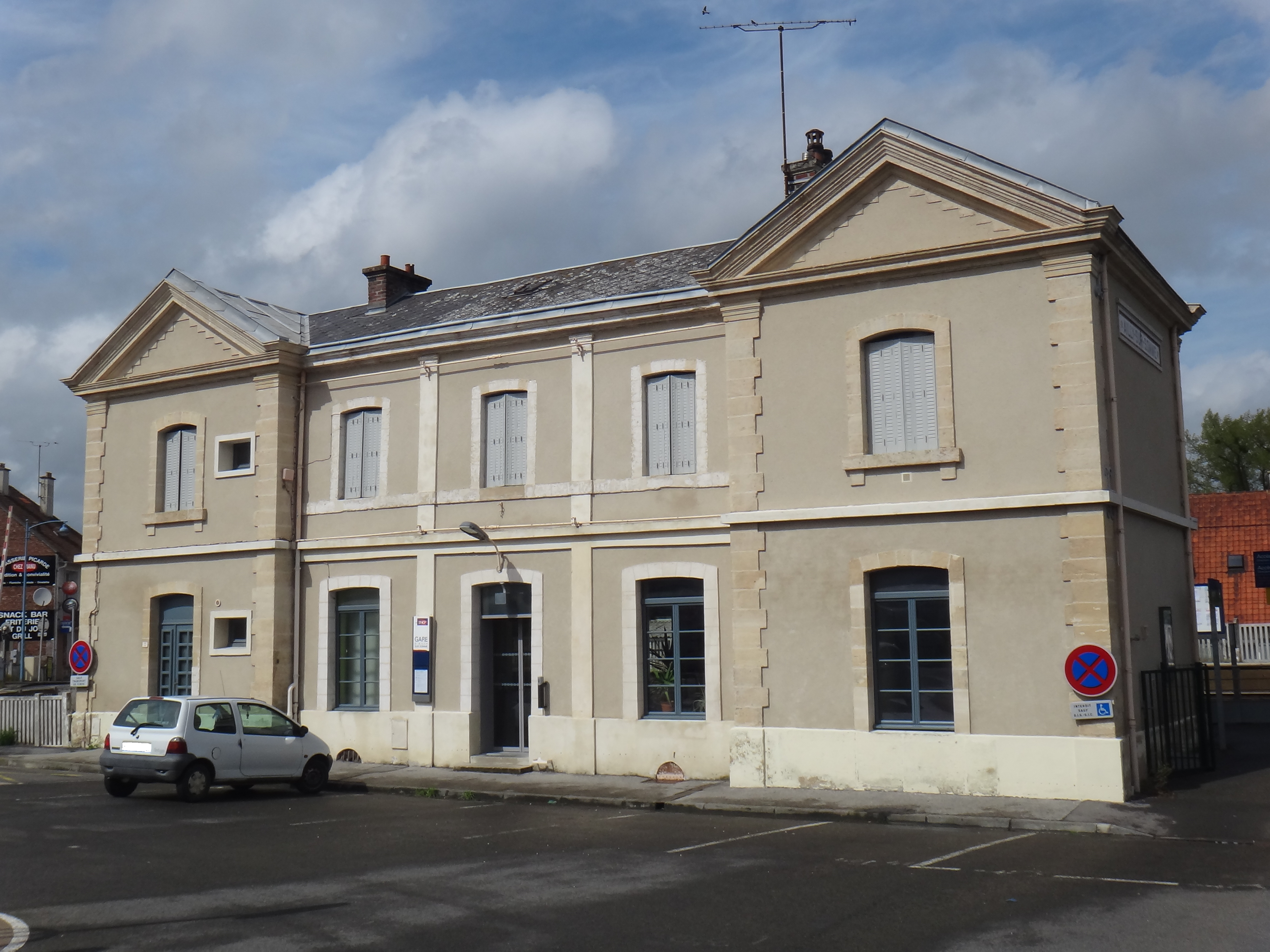
- The station in 2014.

General information
- Location: Pl. Dupuis; Ailly-sur-Somme
- Coordinates: 49°55′42″N 2°12′2″E
- Owner: RFF/SNCF
- Line: Longueau–Boulogne railway

Other information
- Station code: 87313098

History
- Opened: 1847

Services
| Preceding station | TER Hauts-de-France | Following station |
|---|---|---|
| Picquigny towards Abbeville | Proxi P21 | Dreuil-lès-Amiens towards Albert |
Location

Ailly-sur-Somme is a railway station located in the commune of Ailly-sur-Somme in the Somme department, France. The station is served by TER Hauts-de-France trains (Abbeville - Amiens - Albert line).

== See also ==
- List of SNCF stations in Hauts-de-France
