= Namps–Quevauvillers station =

French railway station

Namps–Quevauvillers
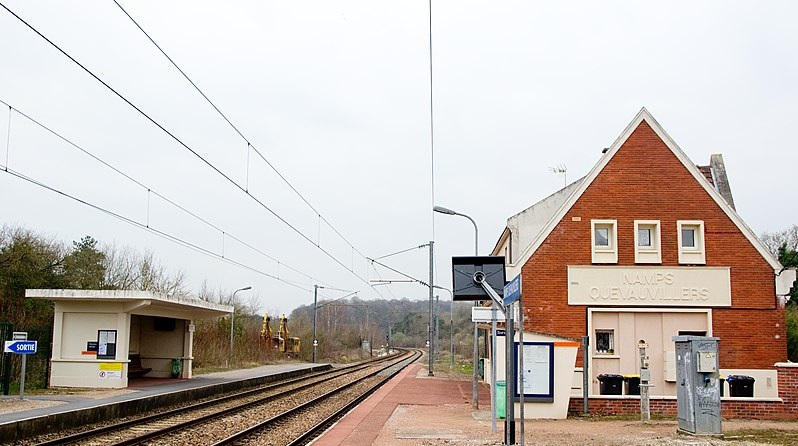
- Namps–Quevauvillers station

General information
- Location: Place de la gare, Namps-Maisnil
- Coordinates: 49°48′30″N 2°6′19″E
- Elevation: 101.6 m (333 ft)
- Owner: RFF/SNCF
- Line: Amiens–Rouen railway
- Platforms: 2
- Tracks: 2

Other information
- Station code: 87313379

History
- Electrified: 1984

Passengers
- 2003: 5 per day

Services
Preceding station	TER Hauts-de-France	Following station
Saint-Roch (Somme) towards Amiens	Proxi P24	Poix-de-Picardie towards Abancourt
Location

Namps–Quevauvillers is a railway station located in the commune of Namps-Maisnil and near Quevauvillers, in the Somme department, France. The station is served by TER Hauts-de-France trains from Amiens to Abancourt. The station is one of several low importance stations along the 139 km long line. According to the SNCF, in 2003 it averaged 5 passengers per operating day.

== See also ==
- List of SNCF stations in Hauts-de-France
