= Dreuil-lès-Amiens station =

Railway station in Somme, France

Dreuil-lès-Amiens
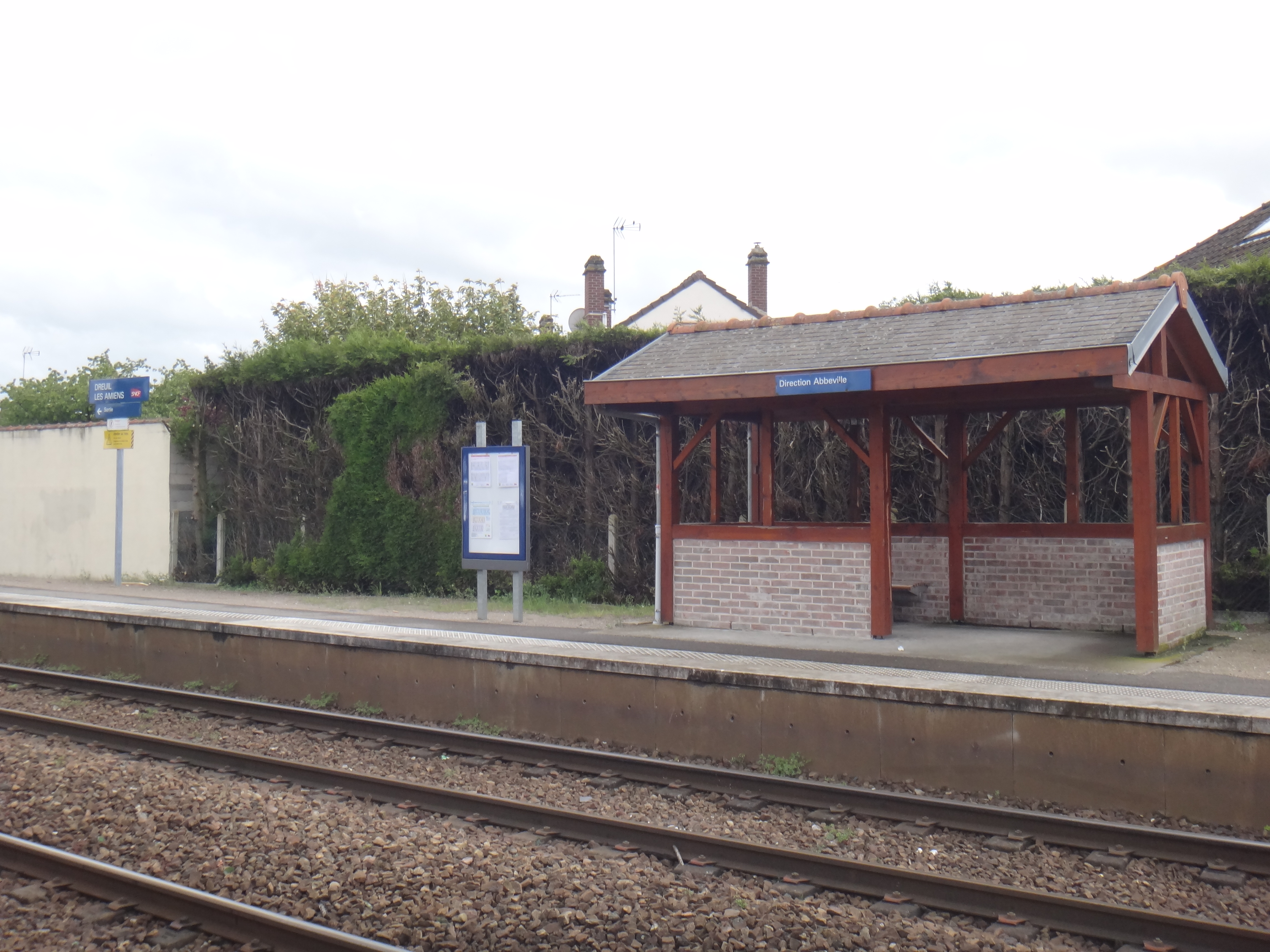

General information
- Location: Dreuil-lès-Amiens
- Coordinates: 49°54′53″N 2°13′49″E
- Owner: RFF/SNCF
- Line: Longueau–Boulogne railway

Other information
- Station code: 87316075

Services
Preceding station	TER Hauts-de-France	Following station
Ailly-sur-Somme towards Abbeville	Proxi P21	Saint-Roch (Somme) towards Albert
Location

Dreuil-lès-Amiens is a railway station located in the commune of Dreuil-lès-Amiens in the Somme department, France. The station is served by TER Hauts-de-France trains (Abbeville - Amiens - Albert line).

== See also ==
- List of SNCF stations in Hauts-de-France
