= Fouilloy station =

Railway station in France

Fouilloy
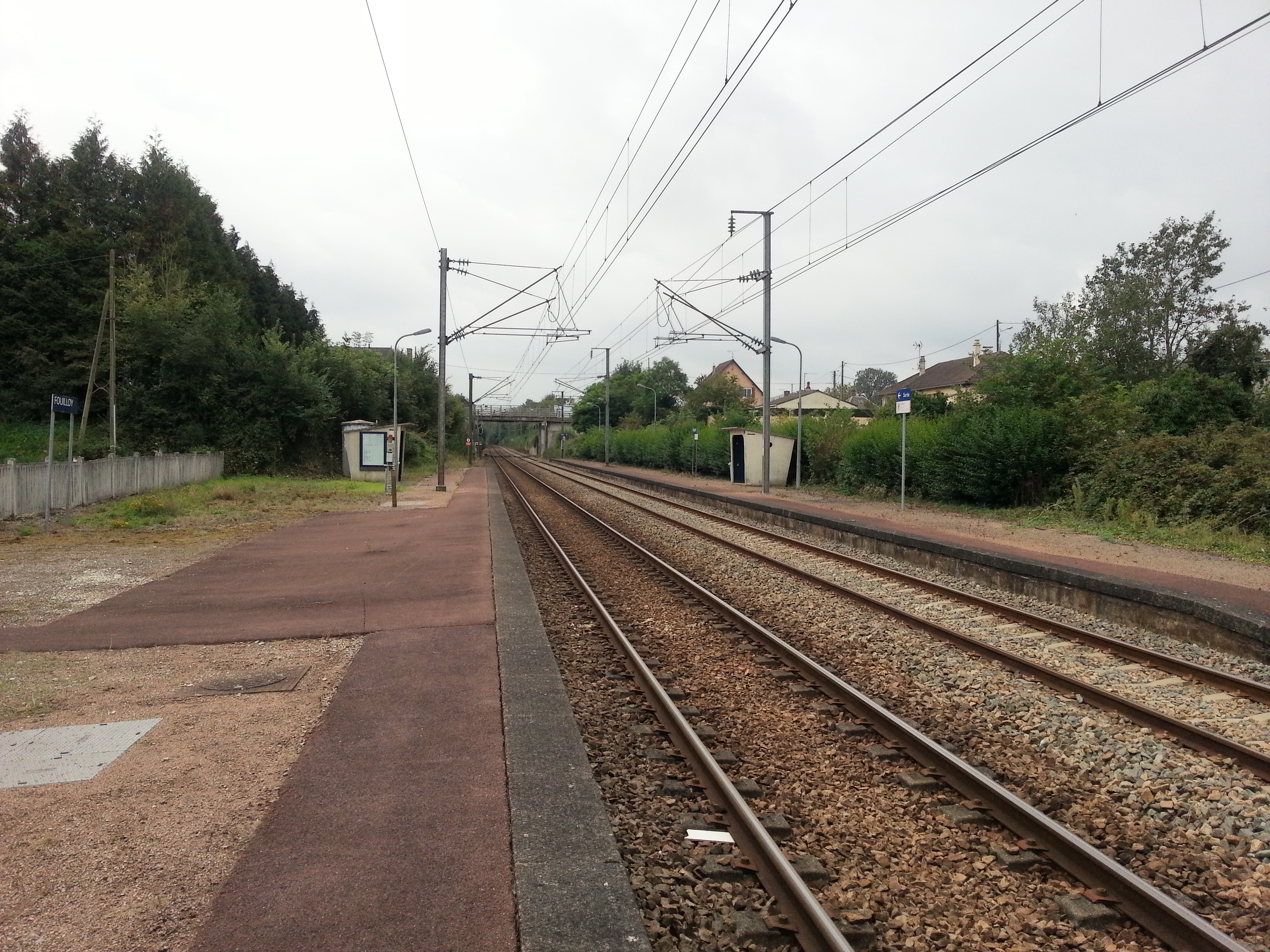

General information
- Location: Rue de la Gare, Fouilloy
- Coordinates: 49°44′11″N 1°49′34″E
- Owner: RFF/SNCF
- Line: Amiens–Rouen railway

Other information
- Station code: 87313841

Services
Preceding station	TER Hauts-de-France	Following station
Poix-de-Picardie towards Amiens	Proxi P24	Abancourt Terminus
Location

Fouilloy is a railway station located in the commune of Fouilloy in the Oise department, France. The station is served by TER Hauts-de-France trains from Amiens to Abancourt.

According to the SNCF, the station averaged 3 passengers per operating day in 2003.

== See also ==
- List of SNCF stations in Hauts-de-France
