= Saint-Roch (Somme) station =

Railway station in Amiens, France

Coordinates: 49°53′36″N 2°17′02″E

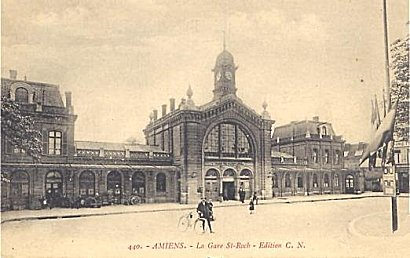
Amiens' Saint-Roch station in the 19th century.

Saint-Roch (Somme) is a station in the Northern French city of Amiens. The station was opened in 1847 when the line from Amiens to Abbeville opened. The station was heavily bombarded during the nights of 18 and 20 May 1940, but the building escaped relatively unscathed. It did not escape the allied bombardments of 1942 and 1944 and was rebuilt by Pierre Dufau in 1945.

== Services ==
The station is served by regional trains to Calais, Rouen and Amiens.

Preceding station	TER Hauts-de-France	Following station
Amiens Terminus	Krono K21	Abbeville towards Calais
Amiens towards Lille-Flandres	Krono K45	Poix-de-Picardie towards Rouen-RD
Dreuil-lès-Amiens towards Abbeville	Proxi P21	Amiens towards Albert
Amiens Terminus	Proxi P24	Namps–Quevauvillers towards Abancourt
Amiens Terminus	Proxi P45	Poix-de-Picardie towards Rouen-RD
