= Fouilloy =

Fouilloy is the name of the following communes in France:

- Fouilloy, Oise, in the Oise department
- Fouilloy, Somme, in the Somme department
