= Gannes station =

French railway station

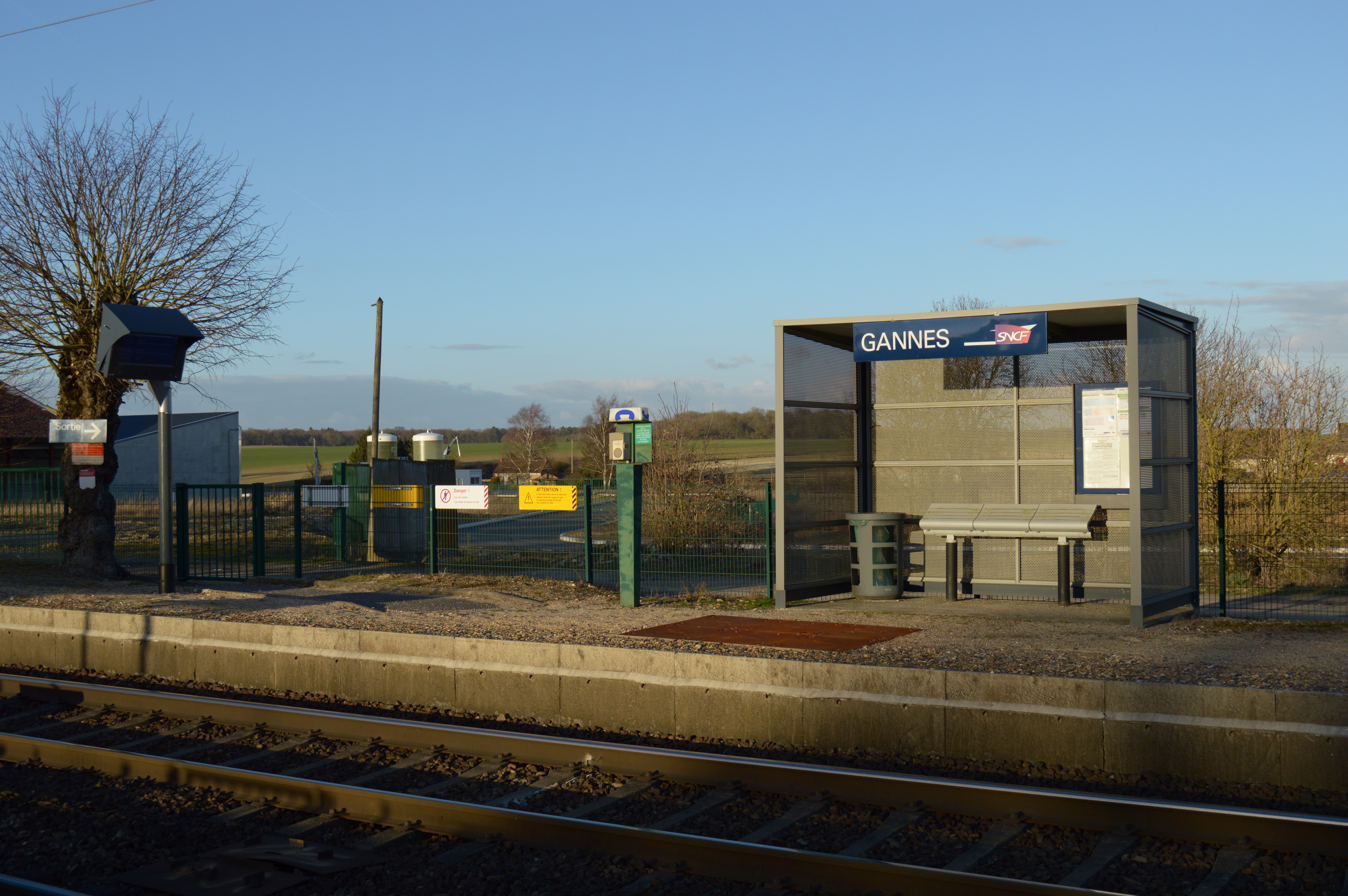

General information
- Location: Gannes
- Coordinates: 49°34′18″N 2°26′15″E
- Owner: RFF/SNCF
- Line: Paris–Lille railway

Other information
- Station code: 87313262

History
- Opened: 1846

Services
Preceding station	TER Hauts-de-France	Following station
Breteuil-Embranchement towards Amiens	Proxi P10	Saint-Just-en-Chaussée towards Creil
Location

The Gannes station (Gare de Gannes) is a railway station on the Paris-Nord–Lille line located in the commune of Gannes in the Oise department, France. The station is served by TER Hauts-de-France trains.

The station was first opened in 1846 by the Compagnie des chemins de fer du Nord (Nord Railway Company). The station formerly had a marshalling yard, used by the surrounding small rural industry. The station was closed in 1940, and was reopened at the Liberation of France. The station building was abandoned and torn down in the 1970s.

== See also ==
- List of SNCF stations in Hauts-de-France
