= Daours station =

Railway station in Aubigny, France

Coordinates: 49.89932°N 2.459199°E

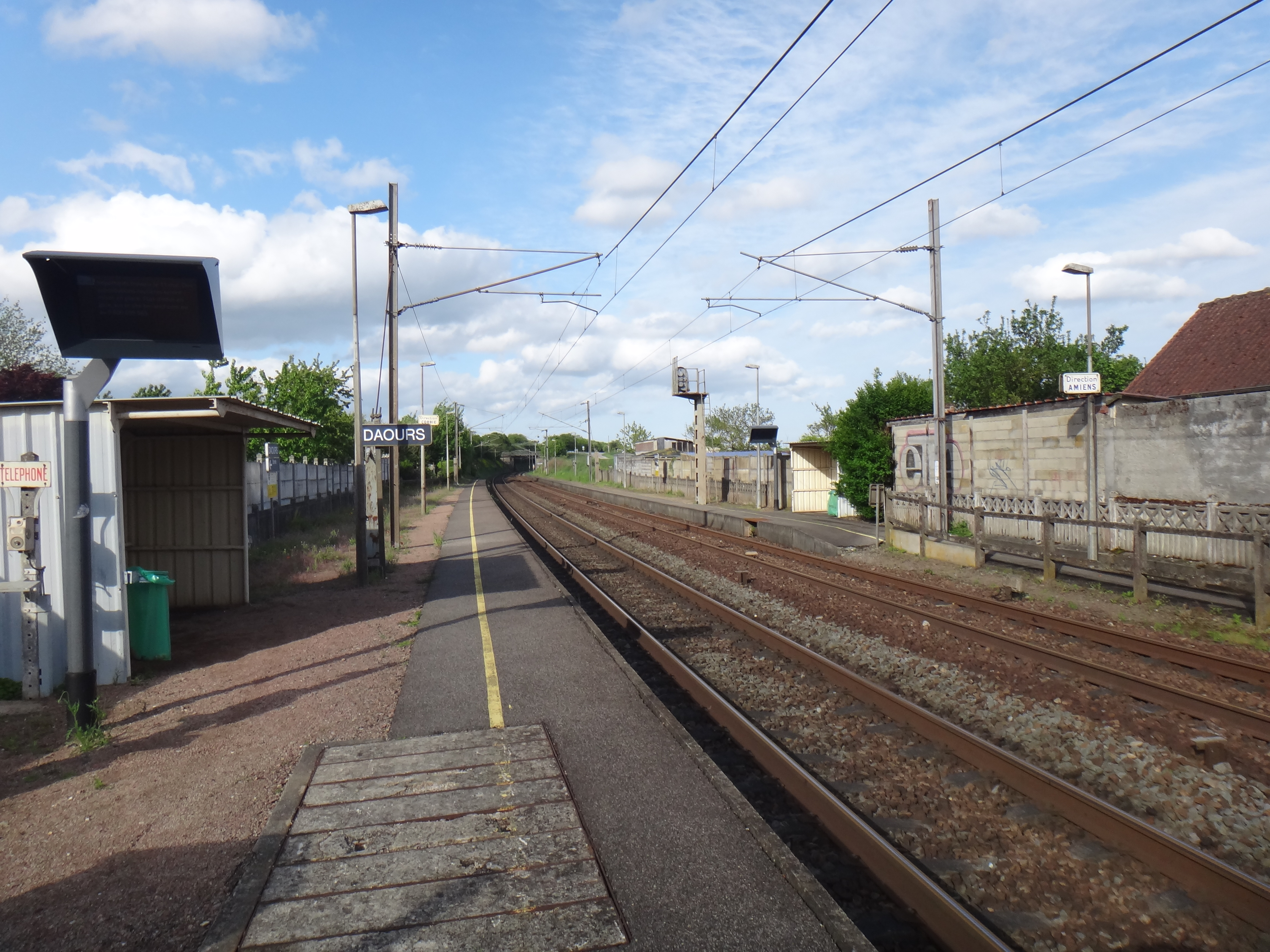
Daours station

Daours is a railway station serving the French towns of Daours and Aubigny in the Somme department. It is situated on the Paris–Lille railway. The station is served by local TER Hauts-de-France services between Albert, Amiens and Abbeville.

Preceding station	TER Hauts-de-France	Following station
Amiens towards Abbeville	Proxi P21	Corbie towards Albert
