= Poix-de-Picardie station =

French railway station

Poix-de-Picardie

General information
- Location: 31 Avenue de la Gare, 80290 Poix-de-Picardie, France
- Coordinates: 49°46′41″N 1°59′24″E
- Elevation: 139.8 m (459 ft)
- Owner: RFF/SNCF
- Line: Amiens–Rouen railway
- Platforms: 2 (not handicap-accessible)
- Tracks: 2

Other information
- Station code: 87313395

History
- Electrified: 1984

Services
Preceding station	TER Hauts-de-France	Following station
Saint-Roch (Somme) towards Lille-Flandres	Krono K45	Abancourt towards Rouen-RD
Namps–Quevauvillers towards Amiens	Proxi P24	Fouilloy towards Abancourt
Saint-Roch (Somme) towards Amiens	Proxi P45	Abancourt towards Rouen-RD
Location

Poix-de-Picardie is a railway station located in the commune of Poix-de-Picardie in the Somme department, France. The station is served by TER Normandie and TER Hauts-de-France trains from Amiens to Rouen.

== The station ==
The station is used more frequently than most along the 139 km long line, where passenger use is light. According to the SNCF it averaged 243 passengers per operating day in 2003. It is no longer staffed; tickets are obtainable from a dispenser on platform 1.

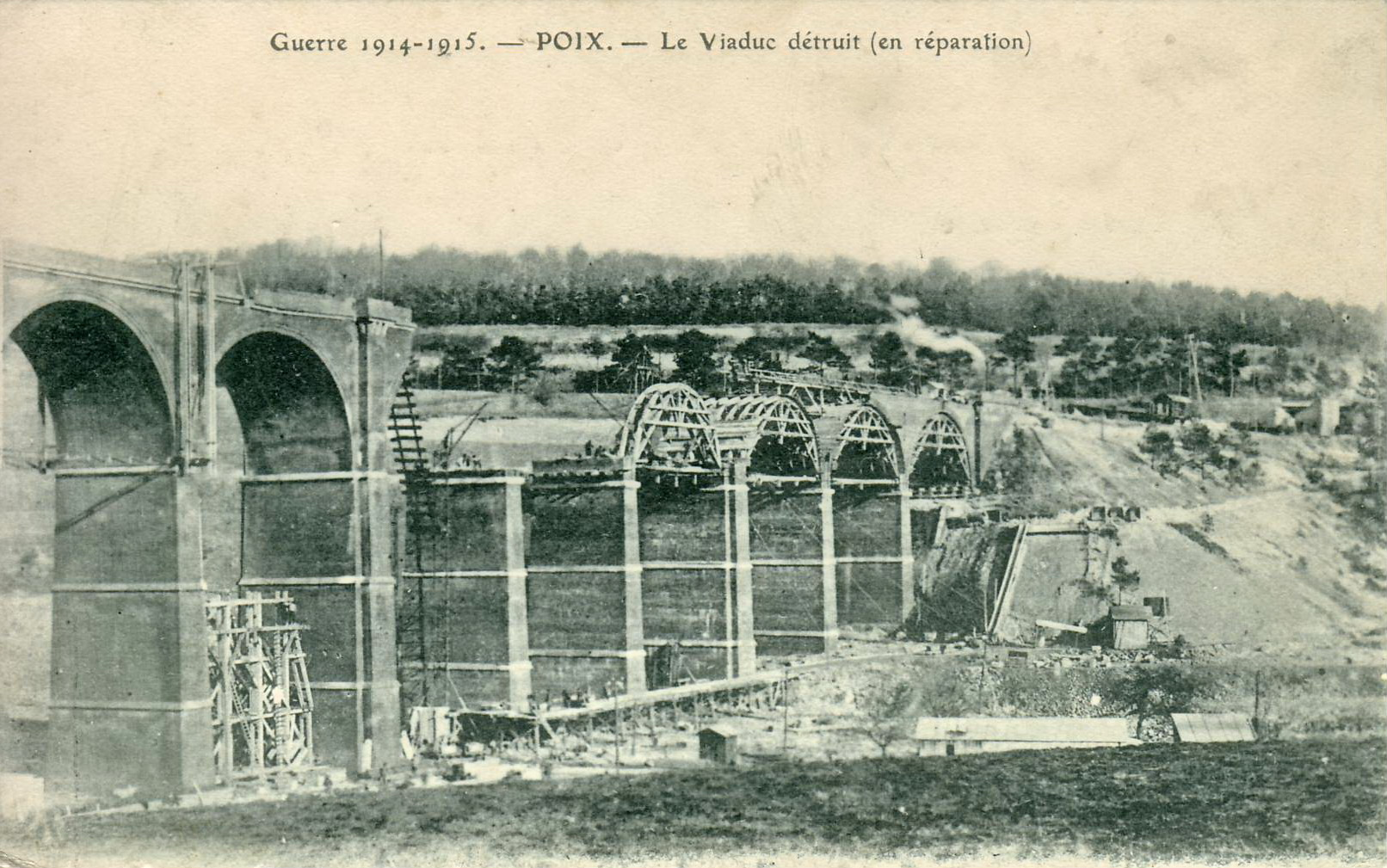
Poix railway viaduct being repaired during the First World War; the viaduct was destroyed three times during the two world wars

== On film ==
In 1968, the railway scenes for the film Le Cerveau by Gérard Oury starring André Bourvil, Jean-Paul Belmondo and David Niven were filmed on the line.

The SNCF also filmed an advertisement on passenger safety on the Poix viaduct in 2004. Mathieu Kassovitz directed.

== See also ==
- List of SNCF stations in Hauts-de-France
