= Namps-Maisnil =

- Commune
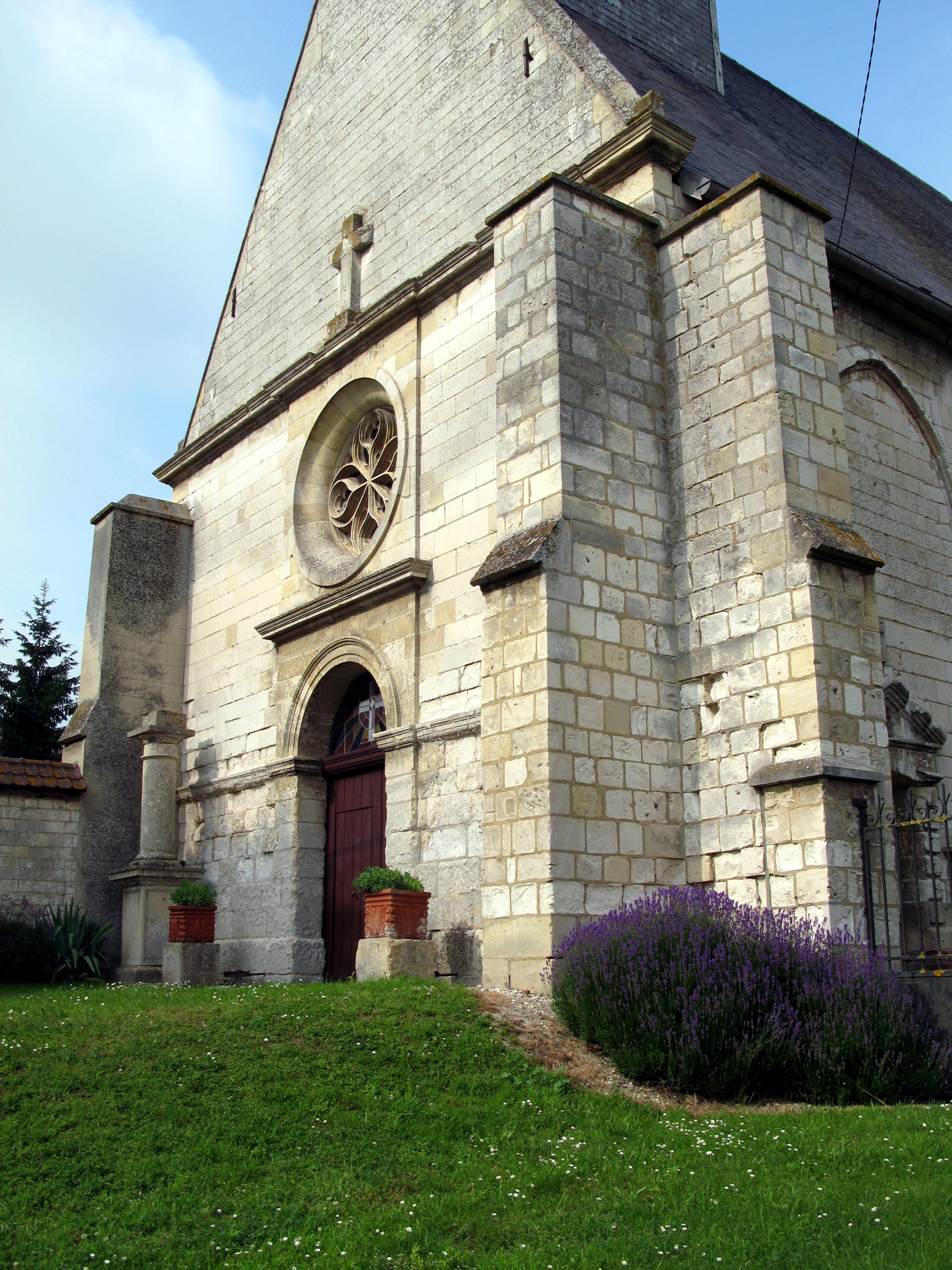
- The church in Taisnil
- Location of Namps-Maisnil
- Location within France Location within Hauts-de-France
- Coordinates: 49°48′13″N 2°06′28″E
- Country: France
- Region: Hauts-de-France
- Department: Somme
- Arrondissement: Amiens
- Canton: Ailly-sur-Noye
- Intercommunality: CC Somme Sud-Ouest

Government
  - Mayor (2020–2026): Catherine D'Hoine
- Area^{1}: 21.96 km^{2} (8.48 sq mi)
- Elevation: 87 m (285 ft)
- Highest elevation: 149 m (489 ft)
- Lowest elevation: 55 m (180 ft)
- Population (2023): 1,013
  - Density: 46.13/km^{2} (119.5/sq mi)
- Time zone: UTC+01:00 (CET)
  - Summer (DST): UTC+02:00 (CEST)
- INSEE/Postal code: 80582 /80290
- ^{1} French Land Register data, which excludes lakes, ponds, glaciers > 1 km^{2} (0.386 sq mi or 247 acres) and river estuaries.

Namps-Maisnil (French pronunciation: [nɑ̃ps mɛnil]) is a commune in the Somme department in Hauts-de-France in northern France.

== Geography ==
A commune created by the amalgamation, in 1972, of the four old communes of Namps-au-Mont, Namps-au-Val, Rumaisnil and Taisnil. The commune is surrounded by forests and situated at the junction of the D169, D61 and D38 roads, some 9 miles (14 km) southwest of Amiens. Namps-Quevauvillers station has rail connections to Amiens and Abancourt.

== Population ==
Historical population
Year	Pop.	±% p.a.
1968	818	—
1975	836	+0.31%
1982	890	+0.90%
1990	970	+1.08%
1999	1,002	+0.36%
2007	1,032	+0.37%
2012	996	−0.71%
2017	987	−0.18%
2023	1,013	+0.43%
Source: INSEE

== Places of interest ==
- The war memorial at Taisnil
- The church at Namps-au-Val
- The Château of Namps-au-Mont

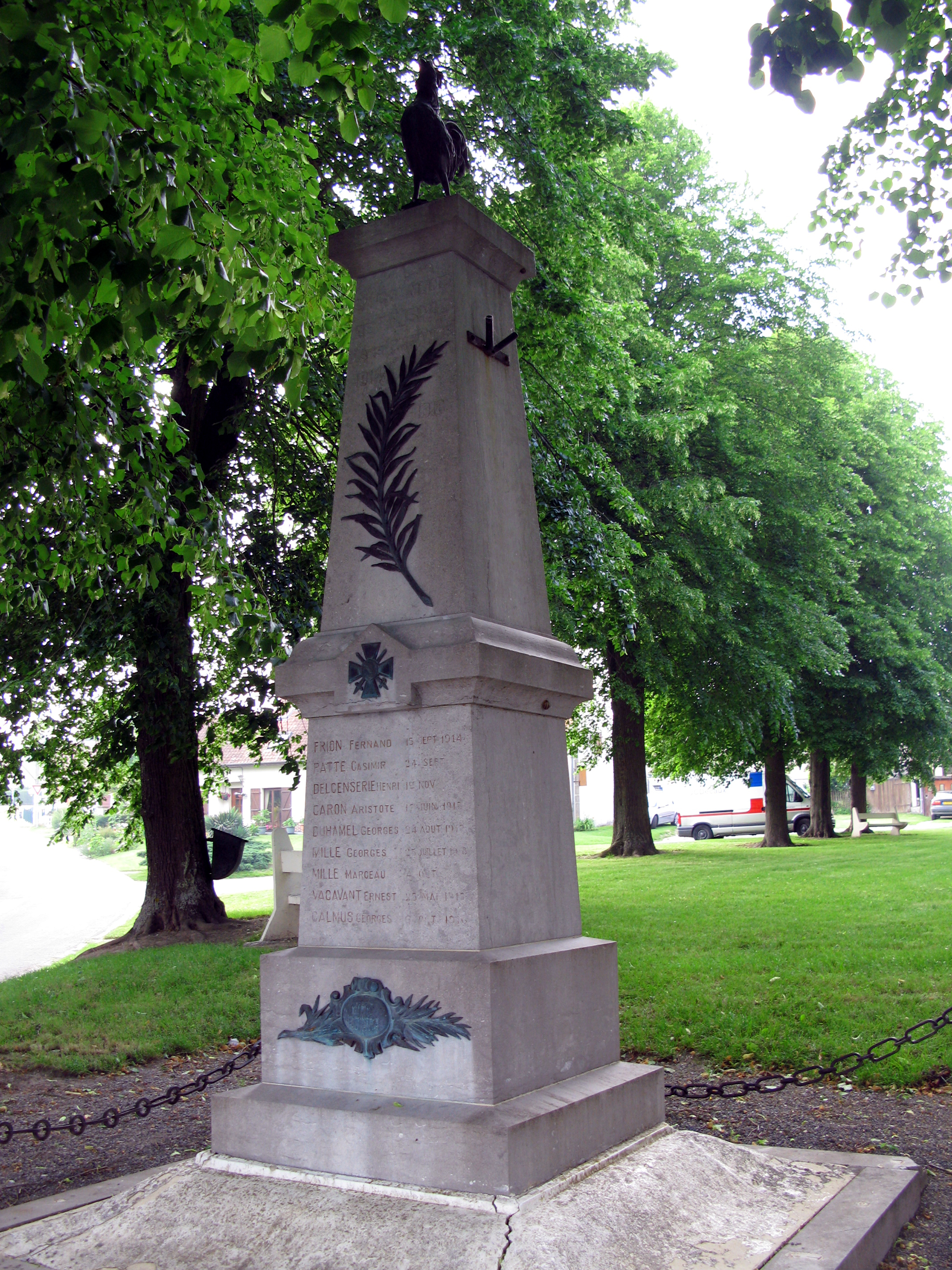
Taisnil war memorial

== See also ==
- Communes of the Somme department
