= Daours =

- Commune
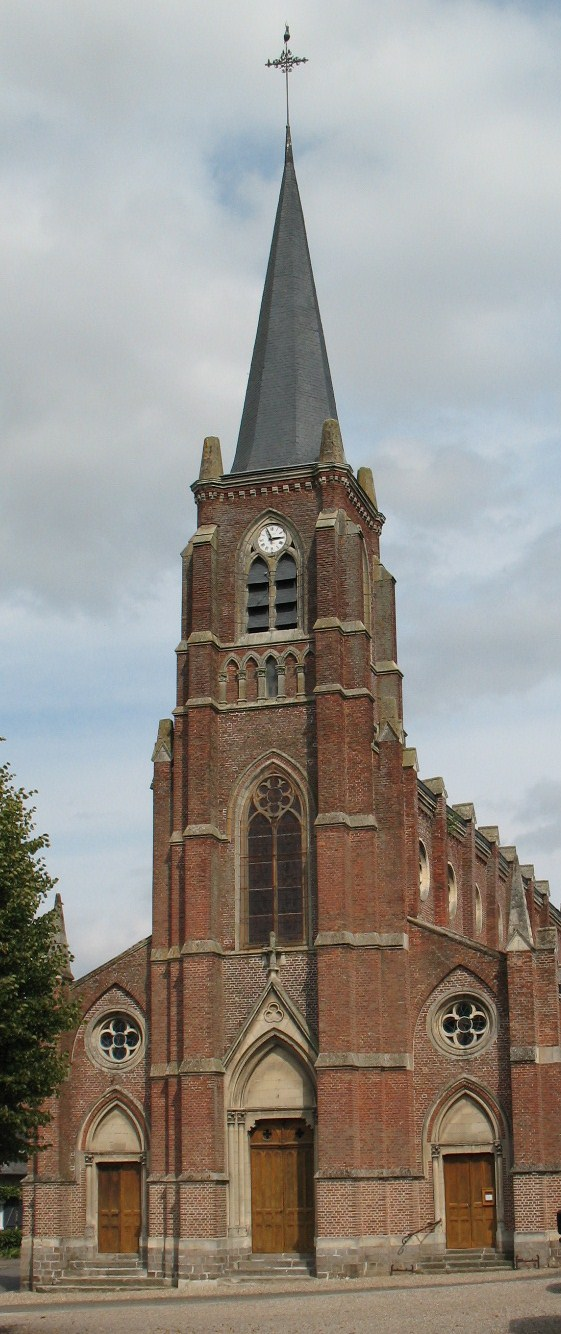
- The church in Daours
- Location of Daours
- Location within France Location within Hauts-de-France
- Coordinates: 49°54′09″N 2°27′00″E
- Country: France
- Region: Hauts-de-France
- Department: Somme
- Arrondissement: Amiens
- Canton: Amiens-3
- Intercommunality: Val de Somme

Government
  - Mayor (2020–2026): Didier Bardet
- Area^{1}: 8.65 km^{2} (3.34 sq mi)
- Elevation: 53 m (174 ft)
- Highest elevation: 96 m (315 ft)
- Lowest elevation: 22 m (72 ft)
- Population (2023): 737
  - Density: 85.2/km^{2} (221/sq mi)
- Time zone: UTC+01:00 (CET)
  - Summer (DST): UTC+02:00 (CEST)
- INSEE/Postal code: 80234 /80800
- ^{1} French Land Register data, which excludes lakes, ponds, glaciers > 1 km^{2} (0.386 sq mi or 247 acres) and river estuaries.

Daours (French pronunciation: [duʁ]; Picard: Dour) is a commune in the Somme department in Hauts-de-France in northern France.

== Geography ==
Daours is situated on the D1 road, on the banks of the river Somme, some 7 miles (11 km) east of Amiens. Daours station has rail connections to Amiens and Albert.

== Population ==
Historical population
Year	Pop.	±% p.a.
1968	718	—
1975	788	+1.34%
1982	762	−0.48%
1990	789	+0.44%
1999	768	−0.30%
2007	777	+0.15%
2012	815	+0.96%
2017	797	−0.45%
2023	737	−1.30%
Source: INSEE

== See also ==
- Communes of the Somme department
