= Gannes =

- Commune
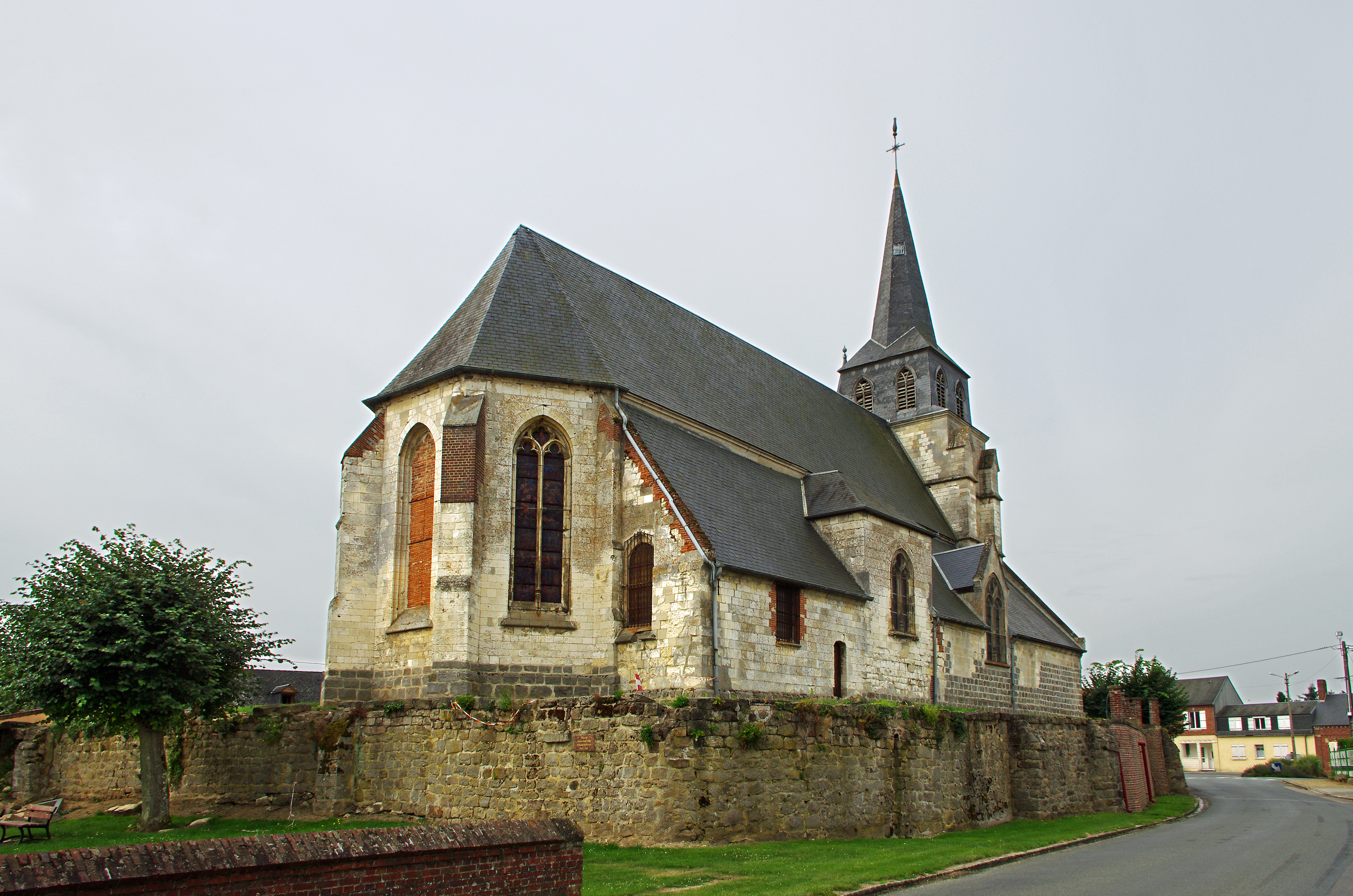
- Church of Saint Denis
- Location of Gannes
- Location within France Location within Hauts-de-France
- Coordinates: 49°34′11″N 2°25′21″E
- Country: France
- Region: Hauts-de-France
- Department: Oise
- Arrondissement: Clermont
- Canton: Saint-Just-en-Chaussée
- Intercommunality: Plateau Picard

Government
  - Mayor (2020–2026): Olivier De Beule
- Area^{1}: 8.56 km^{2} (3.31 sq mi)
- Highest elevation: 144 m (472 ft)
- Lowest elevation: 104 m (341 ft)
- Population (2023): 365
  - Density: 42.6/km^{2} (110/sq mi)
- Time zone: UTC+01:00 (CET)
  - Summer (DST): UTC+02:00 (CEST)
- INSEE/Postal code: 60268 /60120
- ^{1} French Land Register data, which excludes lakes, ponds, glaciers > 1 km^{2} (0.386 sq mi or 247 acres) and river estuaries.

Gannes (French pronunciation: [ɡan]) is a commune in the Oise department in northern France. It is around 35 km south of Amiens and 80 km north of Paris.

It was the site of an air crash in the Second World War. In the early hours of 18 June 1944, Avro Lancaster HK559 of 115 Squadron RAF was shot down near the station on the eastern edge of Gannes, killing all seven crew, who were buried in the village cemetery. On 21 June 2009, just after the 65th anniversary of the event, a permanent memorial stone was unveiled near the site of the crash.

The rail station Gare de Gannes is located in Gannes.

== See also ==
- Communes of the Oise department
