= Dreuil-lès-Amiens =

- Commune
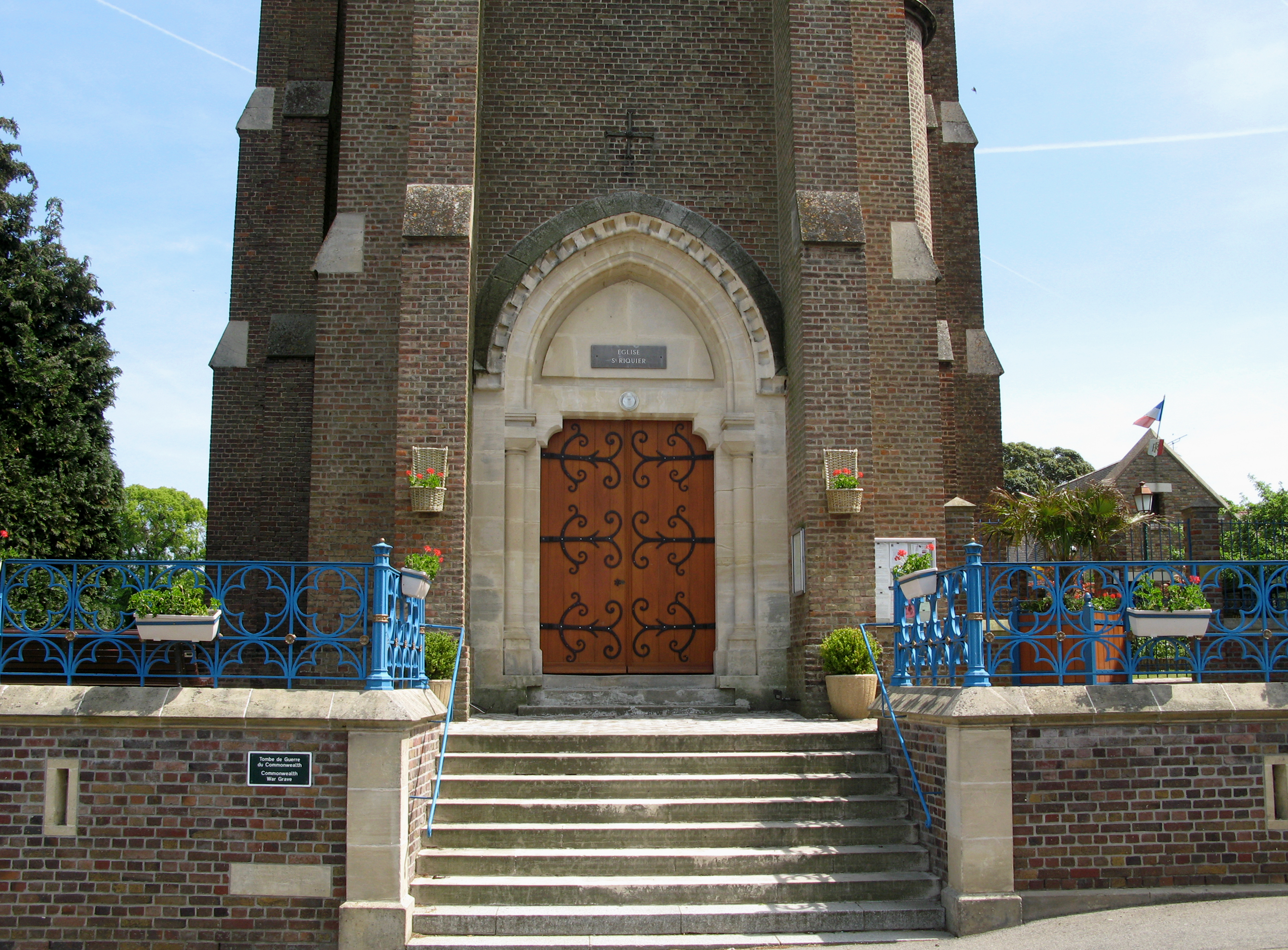
- The church doors in Dreuil-lès-Amiens
- Location of Dreuil-lès-Amiens
- Location within France Location within Hauts-de-France
- Coordinates: 49°54′58″N 2°13′49″E
- Country: France
- Region: Hauts-de-France
- Department: Somme
- Arrondissement: Amiens
- Canton: Ailly-sur-Somme
- Intercommunality: Amiens Métropole

Government
  - Mayor (2020–2026): Maria Trefcon
- Area^{1}: 3.18 km^{2} (1.23 sq mi)
- Elevation: 31 m (102 ft)
- Highest elevation: 87 m (285 ft)
- Lowest elevation: 12 m (39 ft)
- Population (2023): 1,576
  - Density: 496/km^{2} (1,280/sq mi)
- Time zone: UTC+01:00 (CET)
  - Summer (DST): UTC+02:00 (CEST)
- INSEE/Postal code: 80256 /80470
- ^{1} French Land Register data, which excludes lakes, ponds, glaciers > 1 km^{2} (0.386 sq mi or 247 acres) and river estuaries.

Dreuil-lès-Amiens (French pronunciation: [dʁœj lɛ.z‿amjɛ̃], literally Dreuil near Amiens; Picard: Dréeuil-lès-Anmien) is a commune in the Somme department in Hauts-de-France in northern France.

== Geography ==
The commune, a suburb of Amiens, is situated on the banks of the river Somme. Dreuil-lès-Amiens station has rail connections to Amiens and Abbeville.

== Population ==
Historical population
Year	Pop.	±% p.a.
1968	602	—
1975	1,077	+8.66%
1982	1,408	+3.90%
1990	1,613	+1.71%
1999	1,476	−0.98%
2007	1,267	−1.89%
2012	1,270	+0.05%
2017	1,653	+5.41%
2023	1,576	−0.79%
Source: INSEE

== See also ==
- Communes of the Somme department
