= Ailly-sur-Somme =

Commune in Hauts-de-France, France

- Commune
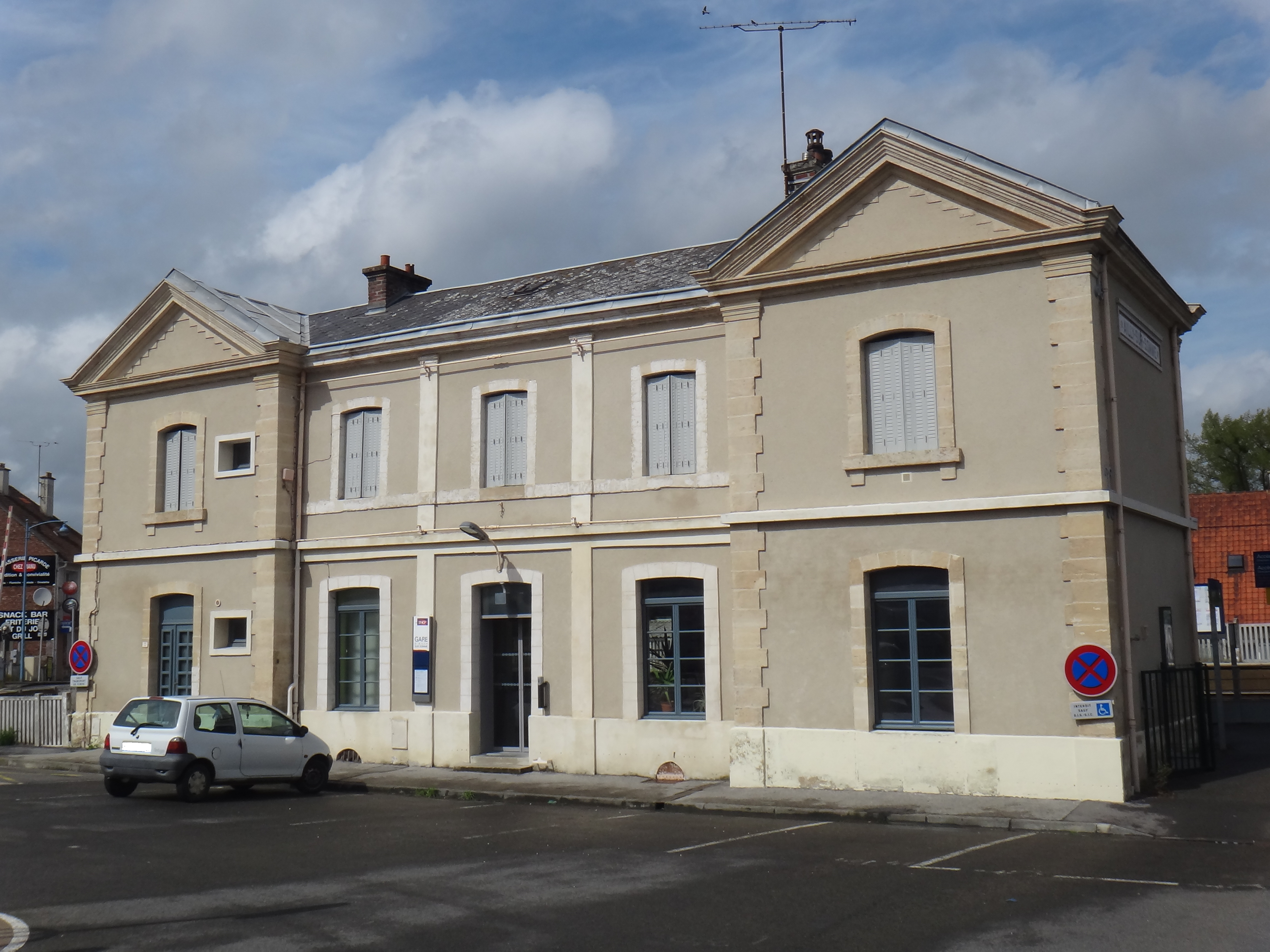
- The railway station in Ailly

- Coat of arms
- Location of Ailly-sur-Somme
- Location within France Location within Hauts-de-France
- Coordinates: 49°55′38″N 2°11′41″E
- Country: France
- Region: Hauts-de-France
- Department: Somme
- Arrondissement: Amiens
- Canton: Ailly-sur-Somme
- Intercommunality: Nièvre et Somme

Government
  - Mayor (2020–2026): Catherine Bénédini
- Area^{1}: 15.06 km^{2} (5.81 sq mi)
- Elevation: 19 m (62 ft)
- Highest elevation: 117 m (384 ft)
- Lowest elevation: 12 m (39 ft)
- Population (2023): 3,003
  - Density: 199.4/km^{2} (516.4/sq mi)
- Time zone: UTC+01:00 (CET)
  - Summer (DST): UTC+02:00 (CEST)
- INSEE/Postal code: 80011 /80470
- ^{1} French Land Register data, which excludes lakes, ponds, glaciers > 1 km^{2} (0.386 sq mi or 247 acres) and river estuaries.

Ailly-sur-Somme (French pronunciation: [aji syʁ sɔm], literally Ailly on Somme; Picard: Ailly-su-Sonme) is a commune in the Somme department in Hauts-de-France in northern France.

== Geography ==
The town is 5 miles to the west of Amiens, in the valley of the Somme. Served by the N235 national road. Ailly-sur-Somme station has rail connections to Amiens and Abbeville.

== History ==
- Around 1850 : Implementation along the Somme, of jute processing factories.
- 11 juillet 1906 : Renowned Paris-Basle passenger train accident

== Population ==
Historical population
Year	Pop.	±% p.a.
1968	2,368	—
1975	4,157	+8.37%
1982	3,972	−0.65%
1990	3,505	−1.55%
1999	3,322	−0.59%
2007	3,164	−0.61%
2012	3,095	−0.44%
2017	2,967	−0.84%
2023	3,003	+0.20%
Source: INSEE

== Personality ==
- James Carmichaël, Scottish industrialist, who installed rope-making equipment.

== See also ==
- Communes of the Somme department
