= Fouilloy, Oise =

Fouilloy
- Commune
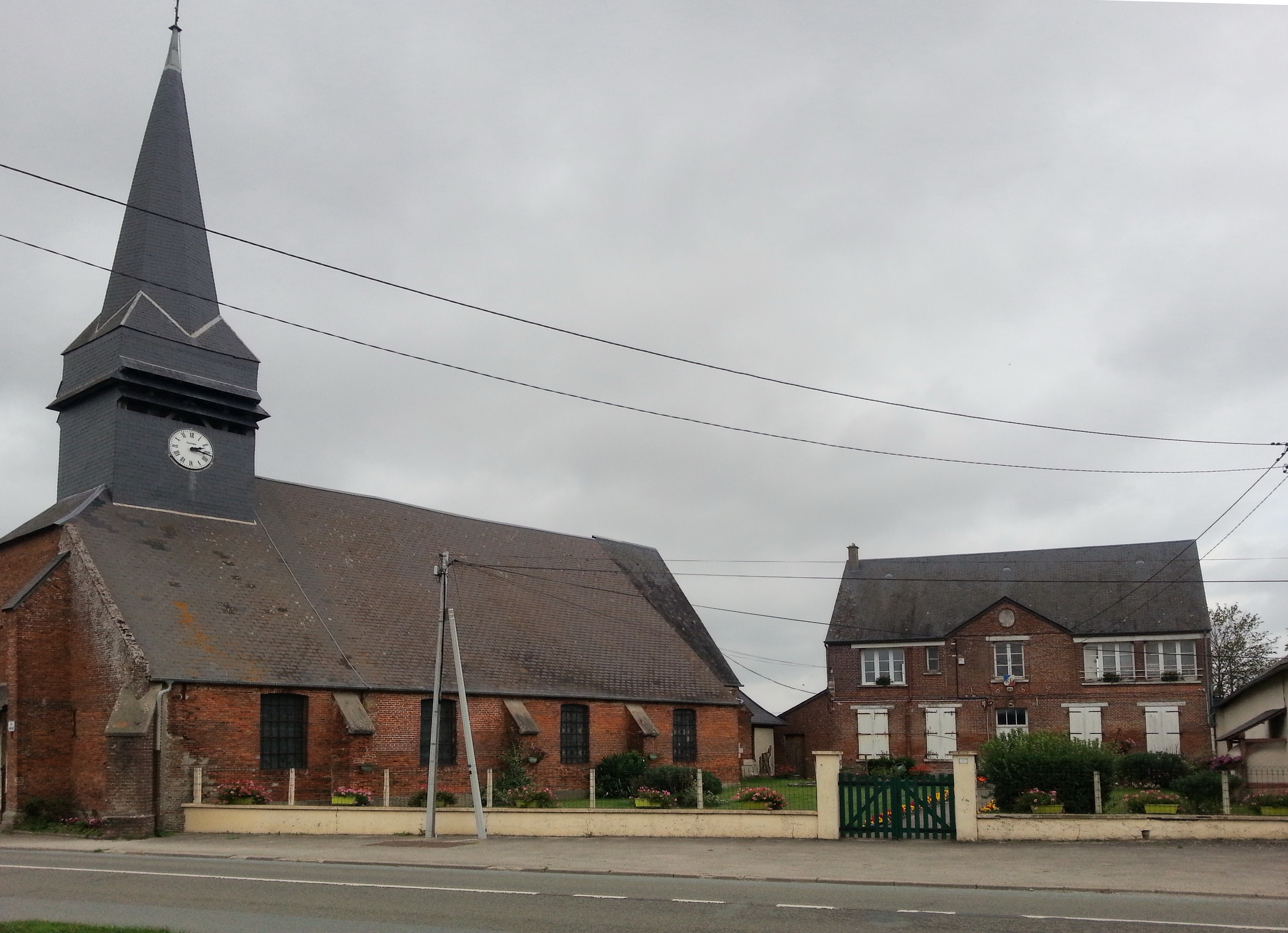
- The town hall and church in Fouilloy
- Location of Fouilloy
- Location within France Location within Hauts-de-France
- Coordinates: 49°44′01″N 1°49′40″E
- Country: France
- Region: Hauts-de-France
- Department: Oise
- Arrondissement: Beauvais
- Canton: Grandvilliers
- Intercommunality: Picardie Verte

Government
  - Mayor (2020–2026): Muriel Caron
- Area^{1}: 4.62 km^{2} (1.78 sq mi)
- Highest elevation: 211 m (692 ft)
- Lowest elevation: 168 m (551 ft)
- Population (2023): 210
  - Density: 45/km^{2} (120/sq mi)
- Time zone: UTC+01:00 (CET)
  - Summer (DST): UTC+02:00 (CEST)
- INSEE/Postal code: 60248 /60220
- ^{1} French Land Register data, which excludes lakes, ponds, glaciers > 1 km^{2} (0.386 sq mi or 247 acres) and river estuaries.

Fouilloy (French pronunciation: [fujwa]) is a commune in the Oise department in northern France. Fouilloy station has rail connections to Amiens and Abancourt.

== See also ==
- Communes of the Oise department
