= Abancourt station =

French railway station

Coordinates: 49°41′8″N 1°46′28″E

Abancourt
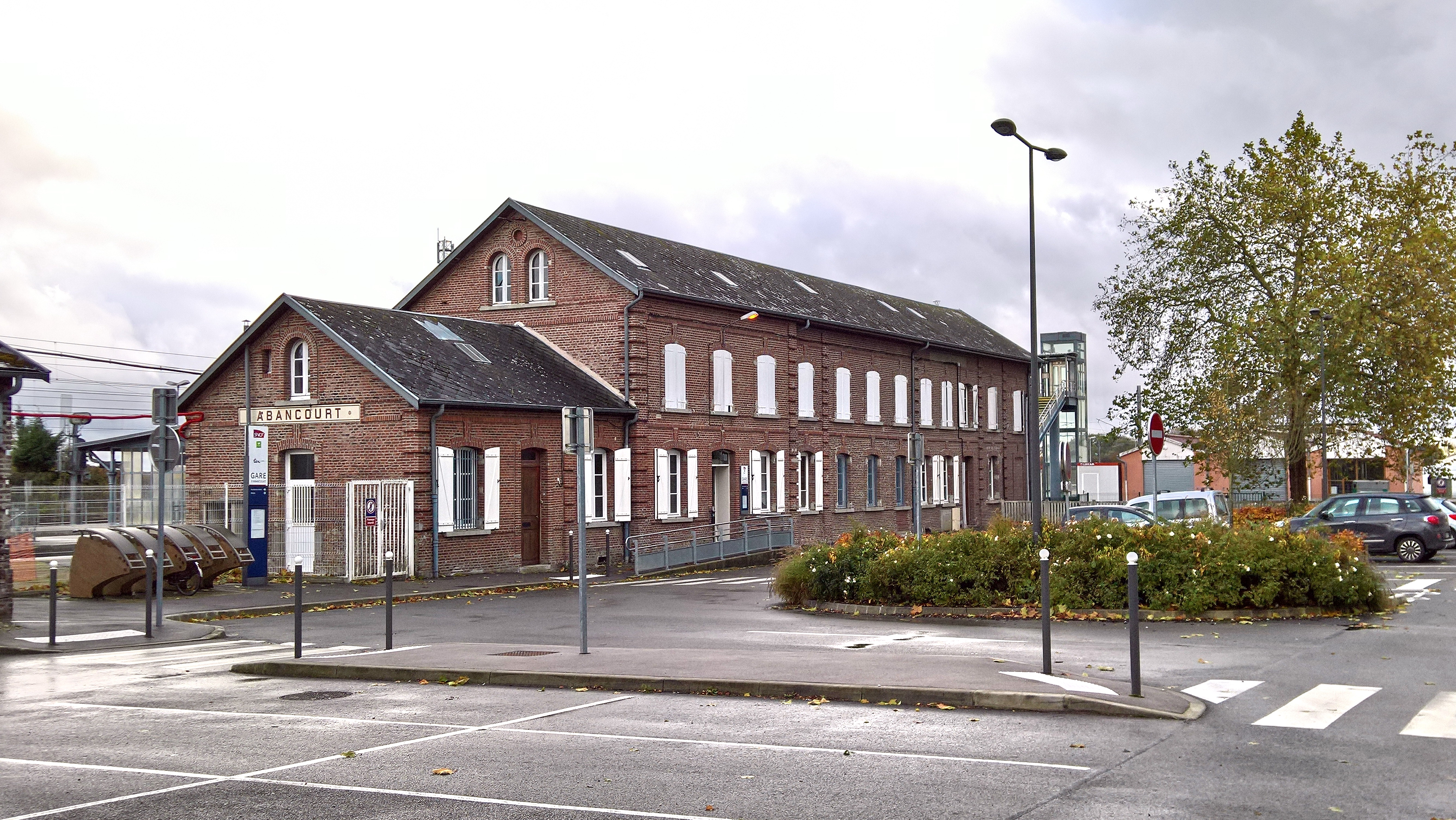
- Abancourt station in 2018

General information
- Location: Place de la Gare; 60220 Abancourt, France
- Owner: SNCF
- Lines: Amiens–Rouen railway Épinay-Villetaneuse–Le Tréport-Mers railway
- Platforms: 1 outside, 2 central
- Tracks: 5 plus sidings

Other information
- Station code: 87313759

History
- Opened: 18 April 1867
- Electrified: 1984

Passengers
- 2003: 95 per day

Services
Preceding station	TER Hauts-de-France	Following station
Poix-de-Picardie towards Lille-Flandres	Krono K45	Serqueux towards Rouen-RD
Fouilloy towards Amiens	Proxi P24	Terminus
Feuquières–Broquiers towards Beauvais	Proxi P30	Aumale towards Le Tréport-Mers
Poix-de-Picardie towards Amiens	Proxi P45	Formerie towards Rouen-RD
Location

Abancourt (French pronunciation: [abɑ̃kuʁ]; French: Gare d'Abancourt) is a railway station in the commune of Abancourt in the Oise department, in Hauts-de-France, France. It is primarily served by TER Hauts-de-France trains.

== Lines ==
The station is located at the intersection of:

- the Rouen – Amiens cross-country main line, electrified in 1984 at 25,000 volts and equipped with the restrained permissivity automatic blocking system
- the radial single-track Paris – Beauvais – Le Tréport-Mers line, using diesel locomotives

== The station ==
=== History ===
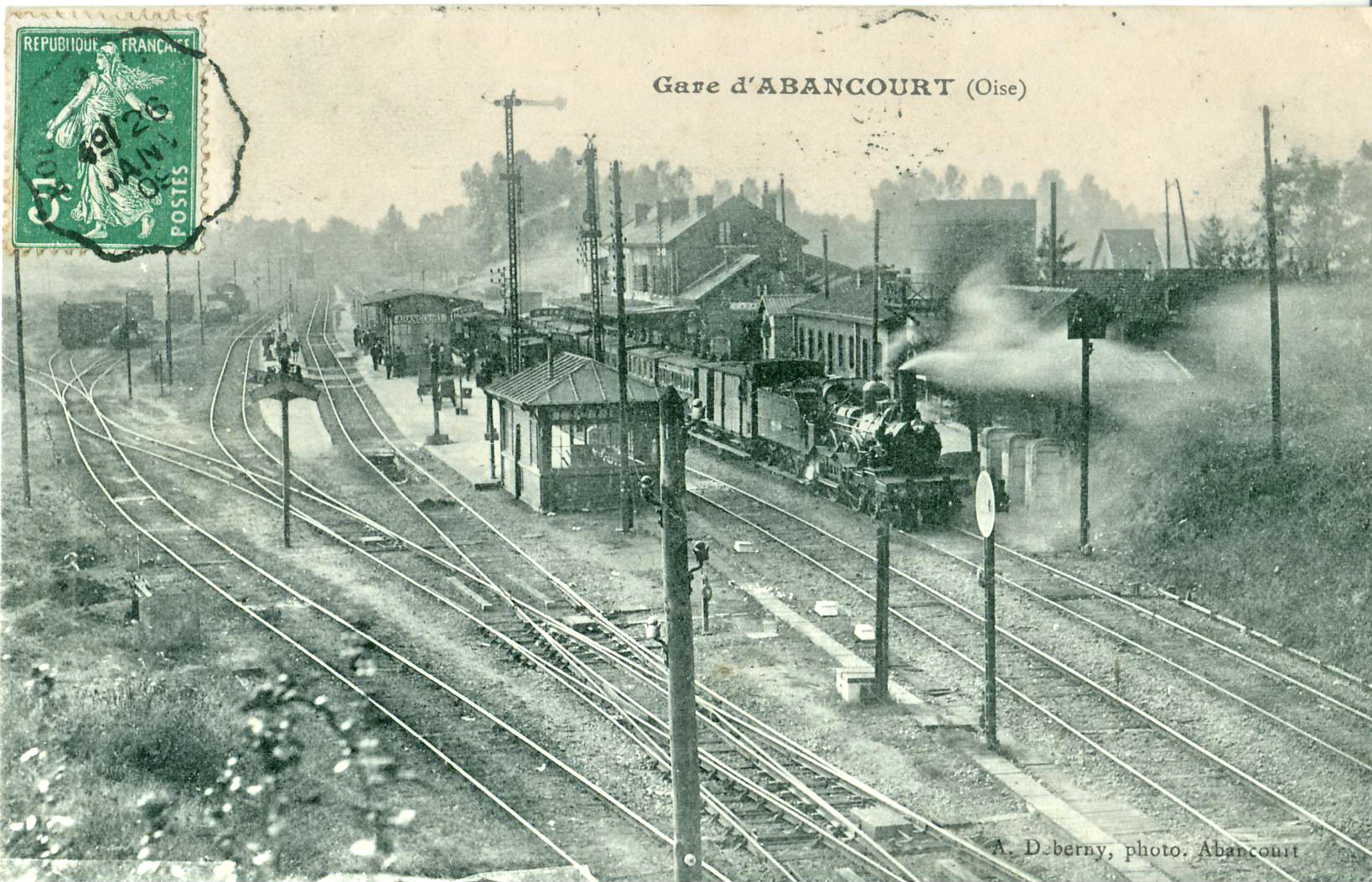
Gare d'Abancourt at the beginning of the 20th century, looking towards Rouen. Lines on right are Amiens - Rouen, centre lines are Paris - Le Tréport-Mers

The railway reached Abancourt in 1867 when the Nord company built the line between Amiens and Rouen. The station was built approximately 1 km from the town, in the hamlet of Hennicourt. Following test runs, the line entered service on 18 April 1867, with general service trains taking 3 hours 50 minutes to complete the run from Amiens to Rouen, at an average speed of 35 km/h.

The station was enlarged in 1873 when the stretch of line to Longroy-Gamaches (towards Le Tréport-Mers) was opened, and again in 1875 for the Abancourt – Beauvais stretch.

Because of its location at the junction of two lines, as well as arrangements put in place during World War I, the station has approximately ten sidings, in addition to facilities for serving an agricultural silo.

=== During the Second World War ===
Because of its key position in the rail network (between Nord, Picardy, Paris and Le Havre), the German Army made use of the Abancourt station. Anti-aircraft railcars were used to protect convoys. The station was bombed multiple times by squadrons of the Royal Air Force.

Reinforced concrete shelters remain in place today beside the sidings.

=== Today ===
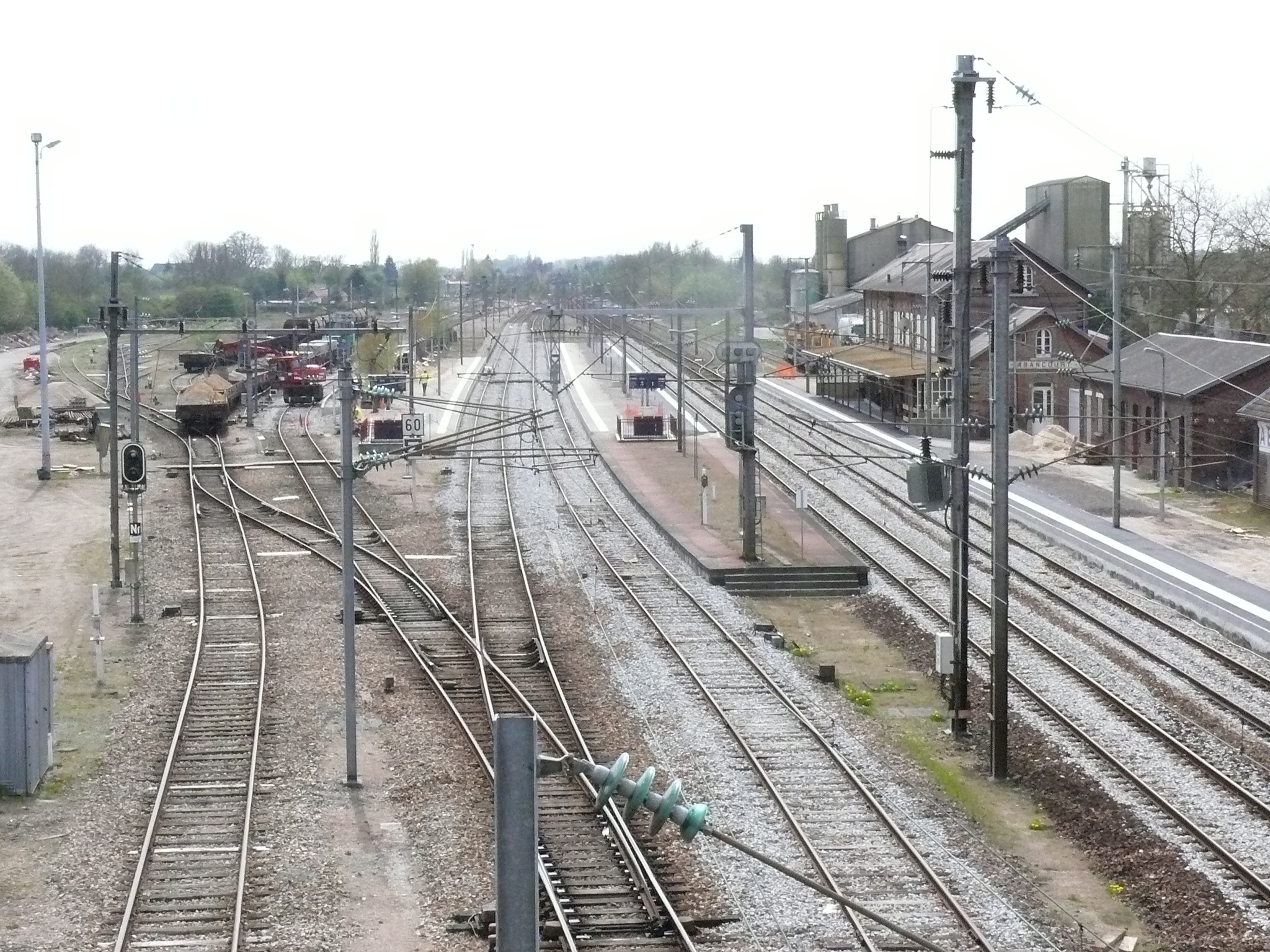
View of the station during work to improve accessibility in 2008. Lines on right are Rouen - Amiens, in centre Paris - Beauvais - Le Tréport-Mers, left, sidings

The station is served by TER Normandie and TER Hauts-de-France trains on the lines between Beauvais and Le Tréport-Mers and between Rouen and Amiens and Lille.

The line was electrified with 25 kV 50 Hz alternating current on 27 August 1984 (freight lines and branch lines continuing to use diesel), and the restrained permissivity automatic blocking system was installed on the line, offering increasingly less satisfactory service with respect to the growing mixed passenger-goods traffic on the line since the 1990s.

The station is one of the few on the 139 km long line which are still important; according to the SNCF it averaged 95 passengers per operating day in 2003. One of the peculiarities of this line is that goods traffic is far more important than passenger traffic. In 1992-93 8,000 tonnes of freight were transported daily on the line, 60% in the Amiens-Rouen direction. This is explained by the industrial importance of the two regions linked by the line and by the ports of Rouen and Le Havre at the Rouen end. On the other hand, passenger demand is weak but tends to be focussed by the express TER Rouen - Amiens - Arras - Douai - Lille axis.

In 2008 the station underwent renovations as part of a programme of increasing accessibility on the Beauvais - Abancourt stretch of line. The platforms were enhanced and passenger use and information facilities (lighting, signage, shelters, clocks, and ticket machines) were replaced. An audiovisual information system was to be installed in addition. The station approaches and parking facilities were to be modernised.

A TER demand responsive transport service has been put in place to enable residents of Moliens to use the station.

== Points of interest ==
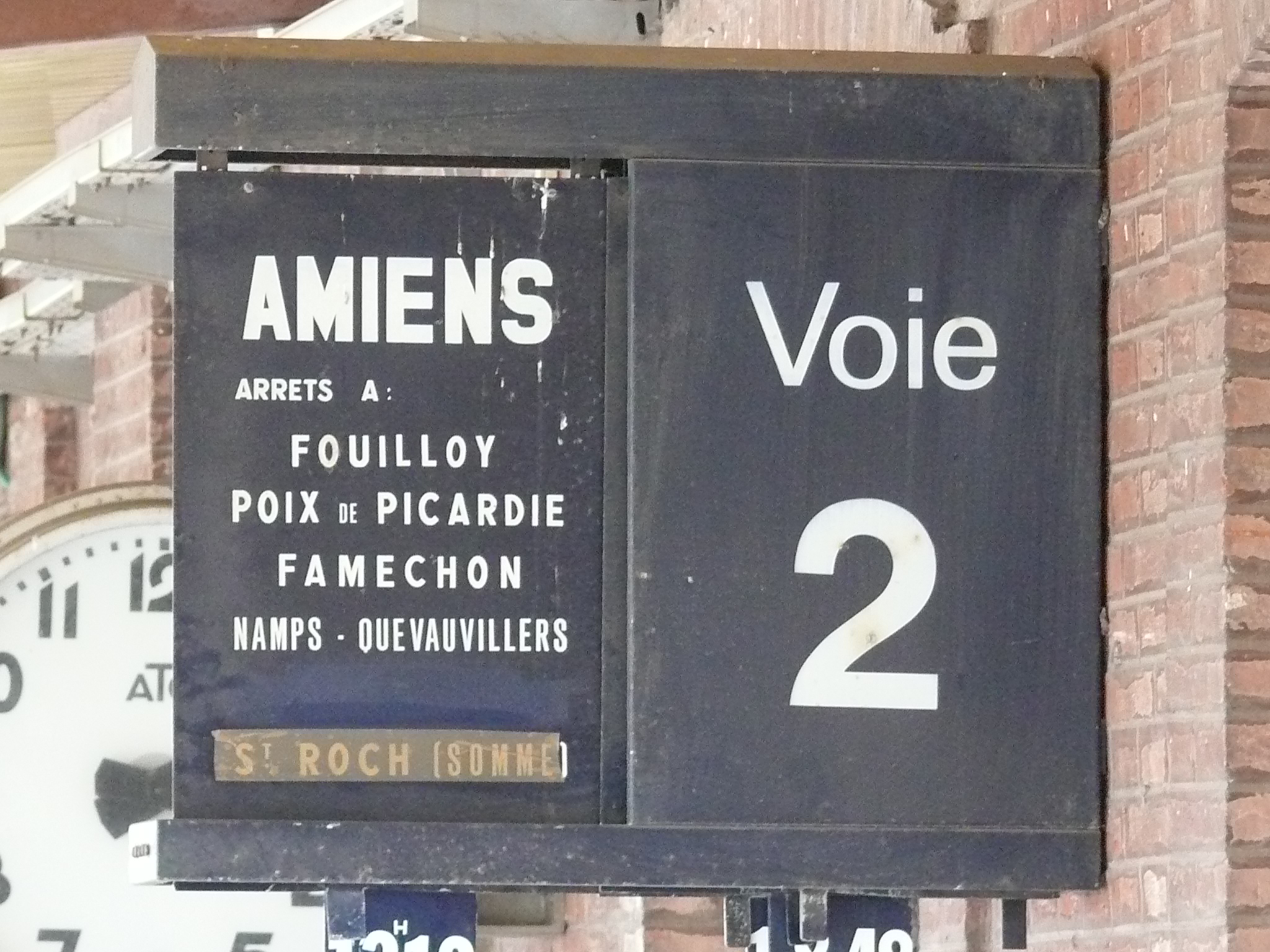
One of the old platform signs

The station has a manual system of train signage on the platforms which uses sliding metal panels.

== See also ==
- List of SNCF stations in Hauts-de-France
