= Abbeville station =

French railway station

Coordinates: 50°6′8″N 1°49′28″E

Abbeville
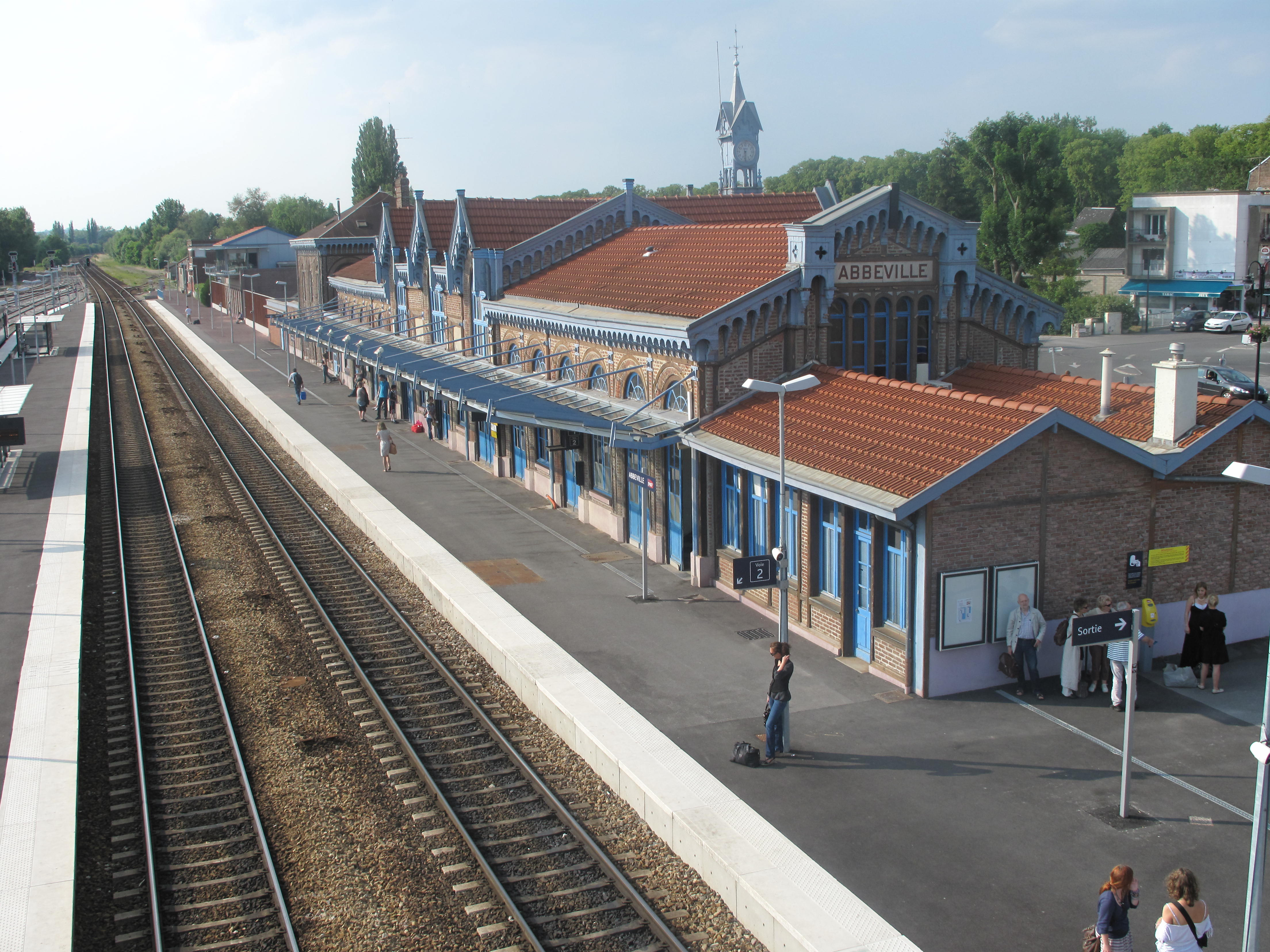
- Gare d'Abbeville

General information
- Location: Place de la gare 80100 Abbeville, France
- Owner: RFF/SNCF
- Lines: Longueau–Boulogne railway, Abbeville–Eu railway

Other information
- Station code: 87317362

History
- Opened: 1856

Passengers
- 2024: 1,024,704

Services
Preceding station	TER Hauts-de-France	Following station
Amiens towards Paris-Nord	Krono K16	Noyelles-sur-Mer towards Calais
Saint-Roch (Somme) towards Amiens	Krono K21	Noyelles-sur-Mer towards Calais
Terminus	Proxi P21	Pont-Remy towards Albert
Location

Abbeville is a railway station serving the town of Abbeville, Somme department, in Hauts-de-France, northern France. It is on the Longueau–Boulogne railway and is the terminus of the Abbeville–Eu railway. It is served principally by TER Hauts-de-France trains.

== History ==
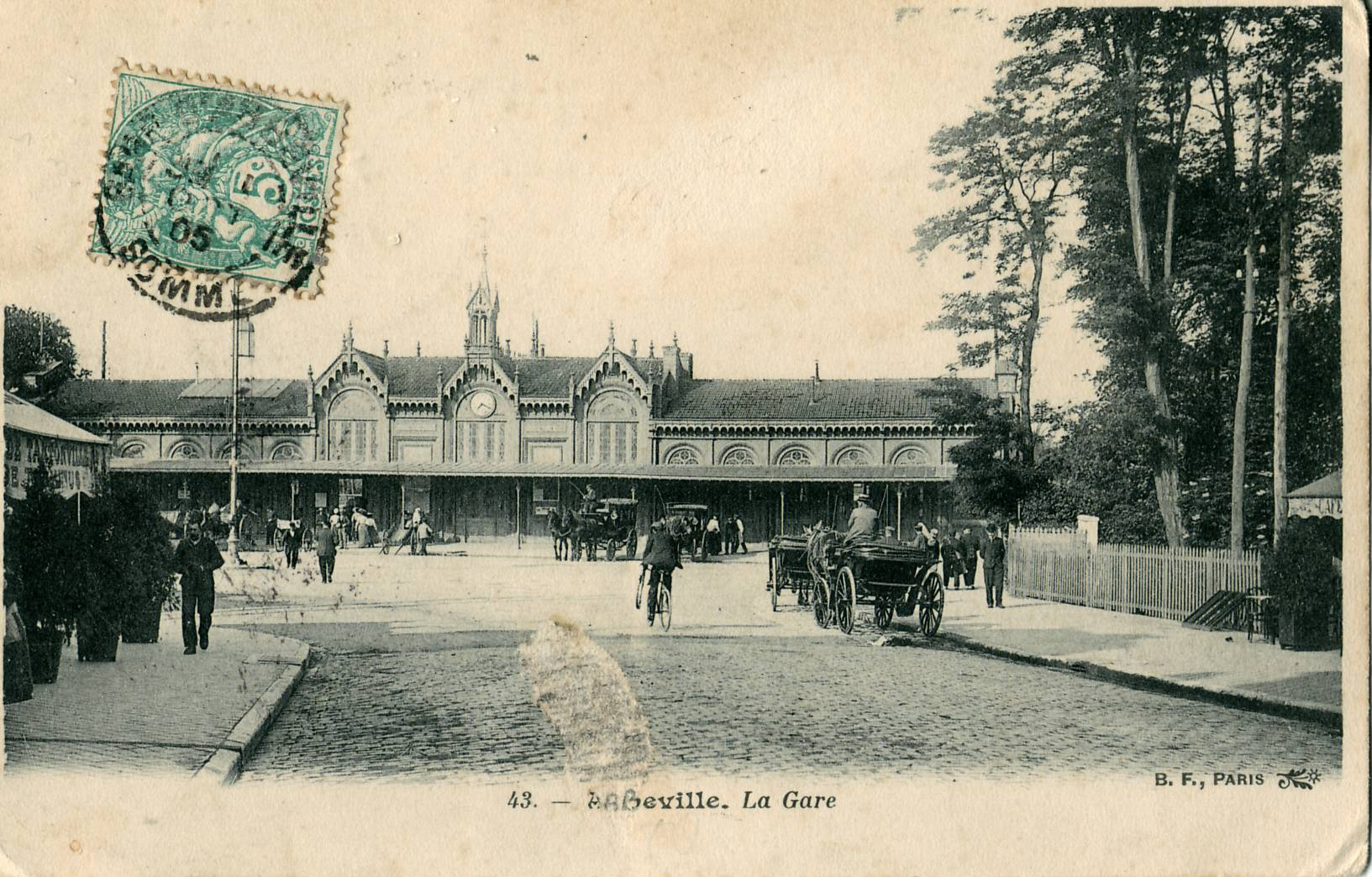
Gare d'Abbeville at the beginning of the 20th century

The Gare d'Abbeville was built by the Nord company in 1856 in regional seaside style.

The station was formerly linked to Lille by a line which ran between Abbeville and Fives via Béthune and Saint-Pol-sur-Ternoise. The Abbeville - Saint-Pol-sur-Ternoise section closed in 1968.

It was also formerly served by a metre gauge local interest line to Dompierre-sur-Authie, part of the Réseau des Bains de Mer of the Chemins de fer départementaux de la Somme, which opened on 19 June 1892 and closed to passenger traffic in 1947.

The building, which is timber faced with red brick, was declared a historic monument on 28 December 1984. It was the last wooden station built in France until the Meuse TGV in 2007.

In 2006 Abbeville station won second prize in the special category for stations of the annual Villes et Villages Fleuris contest, an award to recognise particularly attractive passenger accommodations and landscaping and which takes into account the integration of the station into its surroundings.

In 2007 the Communauté de communes de l'Abbevillois undertook renovations to convert the station into a more modern and welcoming multimodal facility.

== Station ==
The building has a staffed ticket window as well as ticket machines and offers handicapped-accessible services.

== Services ==
The station is served by TER Hauts-de-France trains (Calais - Amiens line). Train services to Le Tréport were discontinued in 2018.
