= Amiens station =

Railway station in Amiens, France

Amiens
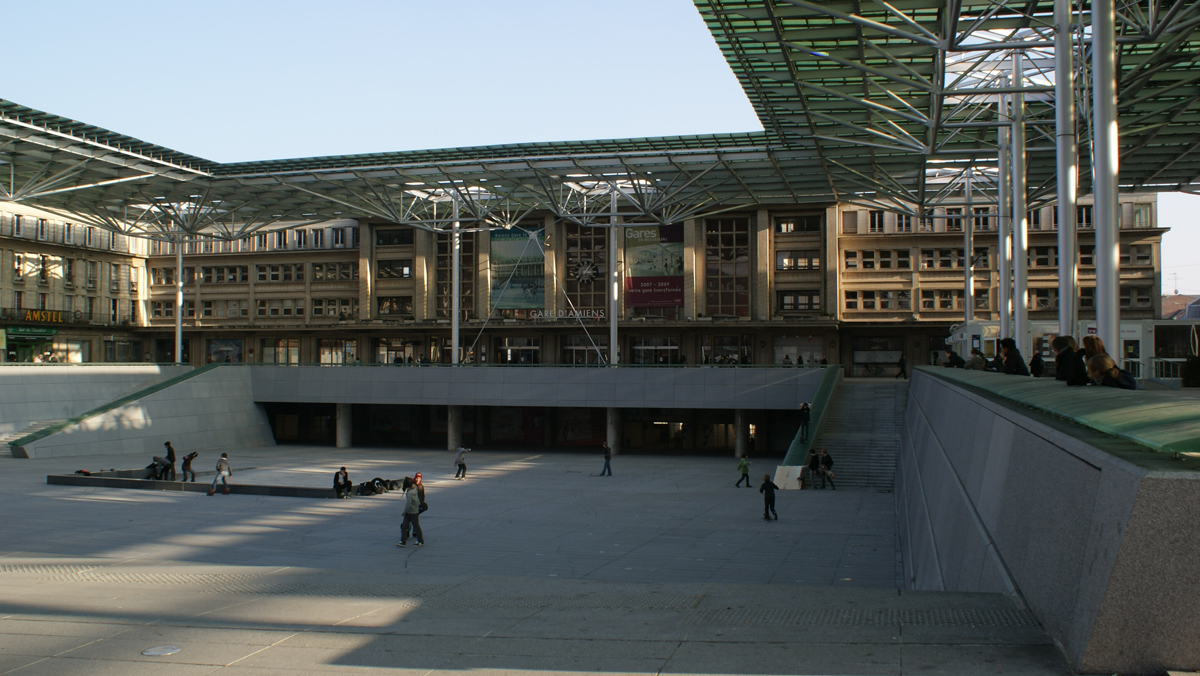

General information
- Location: Amiens, Somme, Hauts-de-France; France
- Coordinates: 49°53′26″N 2°18′30″E
- Line: Longueau–Boulogne railway

Other information
- Station code: 87313874

History
- Opened: 15 March 1847

Passengers
- 2024: 7,395,165
Location

Amiens station (locally known as: Gare du Nord) is the main railway station for the Northern French city of Amiens.

== History ==
The station opened on 15 March 1847 when the line to Abbeville started passenger operations. It was razed by German shelling in World War I, rebuilt, then destroyed again by the Allied forces during World War II and replaced by the present structure built in 1955 by Auguste Perret. A tower called the Tour Perret was built at the same time close to the station. The station district's buildings were collectively registered as a historic monument in 2004.

Amiens is both a terminus and a through station. A concourse was built over the six platforms to facilitate passenger movement. Although the station front was built between adjoining buildings, the hall is as big as its Parisian counterparts.

== Services ==
The station is served by the local TER Normandie and TER Hauts-de-France services to destinations that include Rouen, Calais, Lille, Reims, Compiègne and Paris-Nord. The station is not served by the TGV (high-speed train), but there is currently a bus service between Amiens and the Haute-Picardie TGV station.

Preceding station	TER Hauts-de-France	Following station
Terminus	Krono+ GV K90+	Arras towards Dunkerque
Terminus	Krono+ GV K92+	Arras towards Calais-Fréthun
Terminus	Krono+ GV K94+	Arras towards Rang-du-Fliers
Terminus	Krono K10	Longueau towards Paris-Nord
Longueau towards Paris-Nord	Krono K16	Abbeville towards Calais
Terminus	Krono K20	Ham (Somme) towards Saint-Quentin
Terminus	Krono K21	Saint-Roch (Somme) towards Calais
Corbie towards Lille-Flandres	Krono K45	Saint-Roch (Somme) towards Rouen-RD
Terminus	Citi C10	Longueau towards Paris-Nord
Terminus	Proxi P10	Longueau towards Creil
Terminus	Proxi P20	Villers-Bretonneux towards Laon
Saint-Roch (Somme) towards Abbeville	Proxi P21	Daours towards Albert
Terminus	Proxi P22	Corbie towards Arras
Terminus	Proxi P23	Longueau towards Compiègne
Terminus	Proxi P24	Saint-Roch (Somme) towards Abancourt
Terminus	Proxi P45	Saint-Roch (Somme) towards Rouen-RD

== Pictures ==
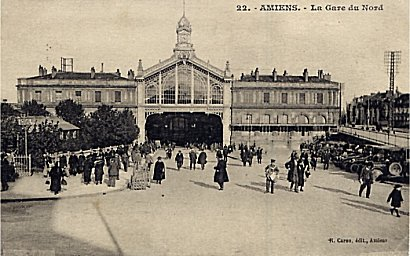
Amiens station, at the beginning of the 20th century, and thus before its rebuilding by Auguste Perret.

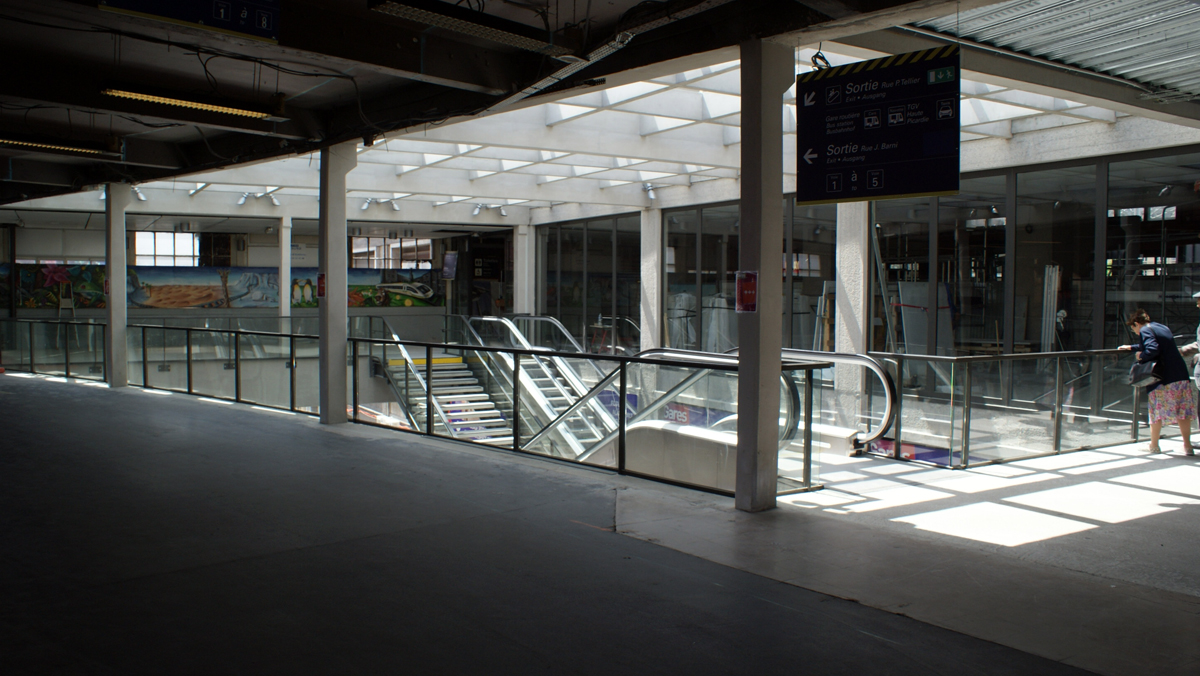
New access to platforms 7,8,9,10,11 and 12.

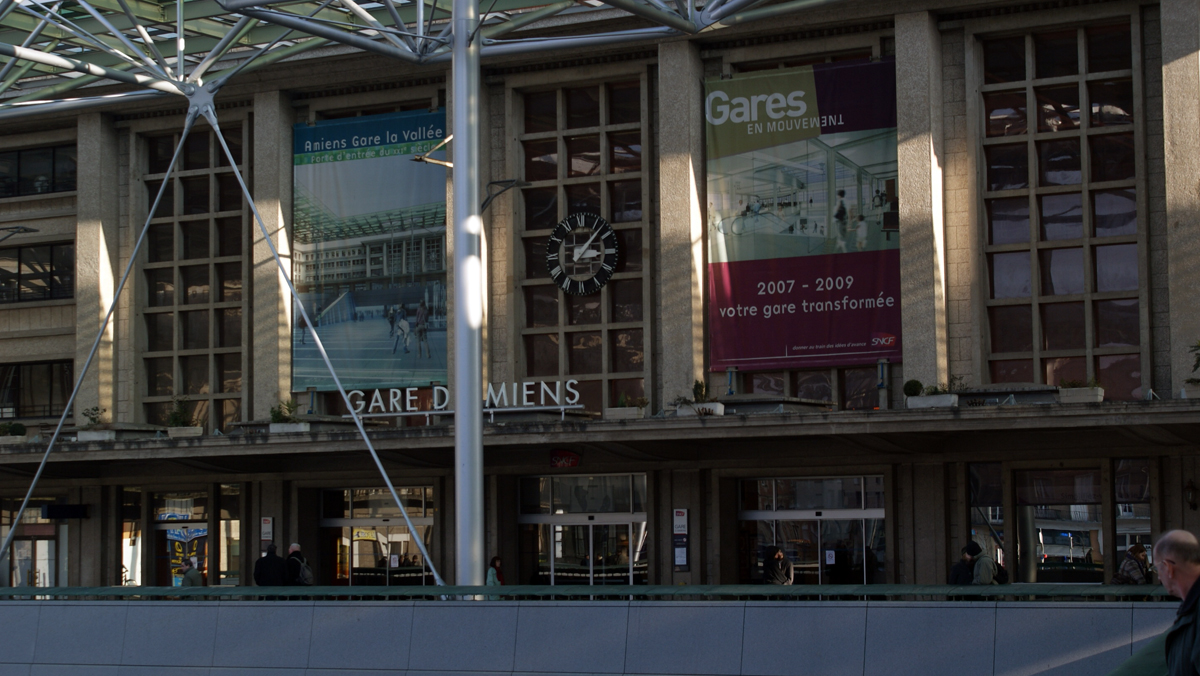
Work in station.

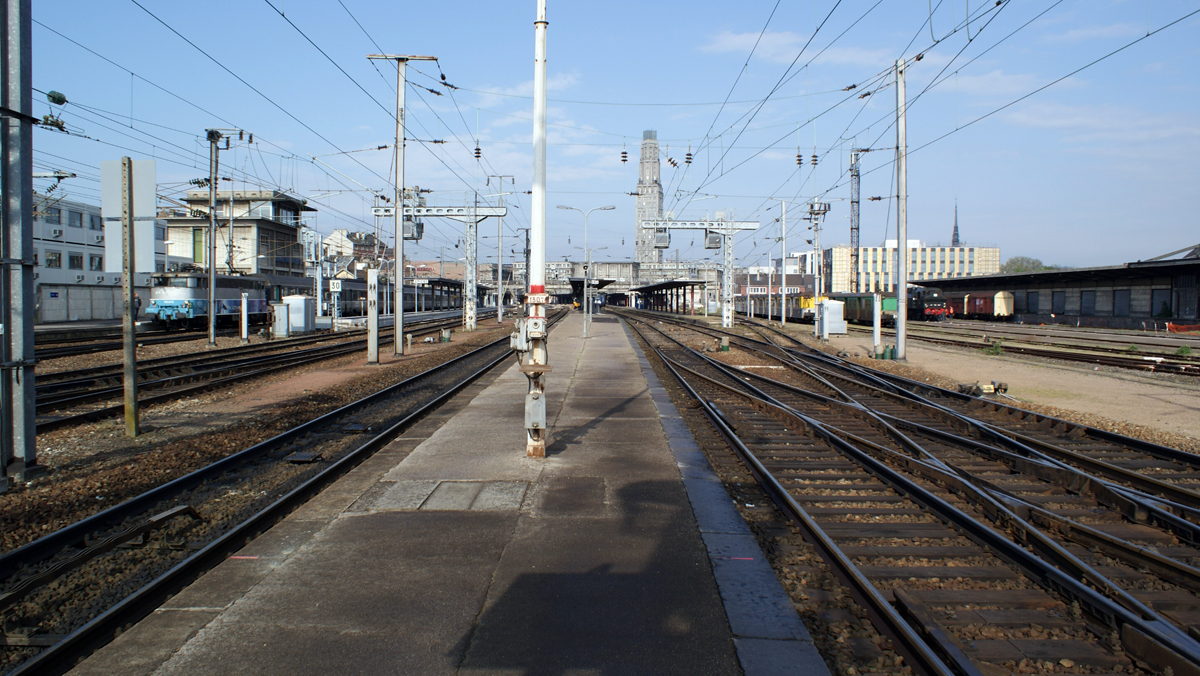
General platform view (sideways).

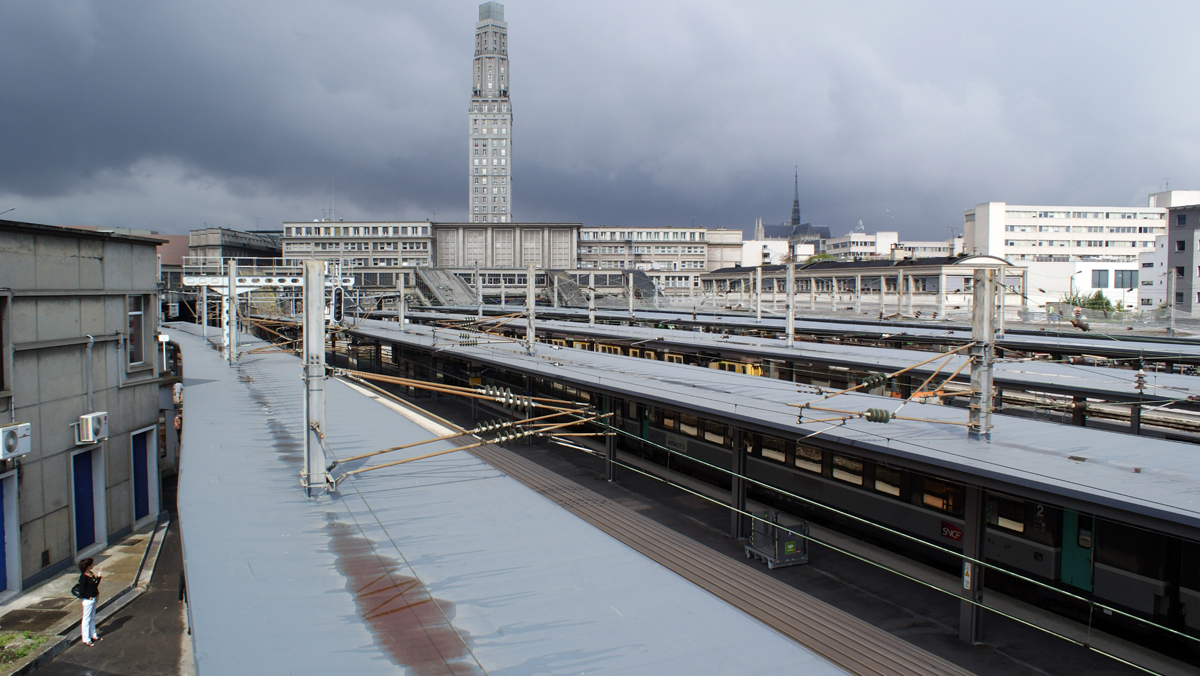
The station seen over the canopies (marchionesses renovated).

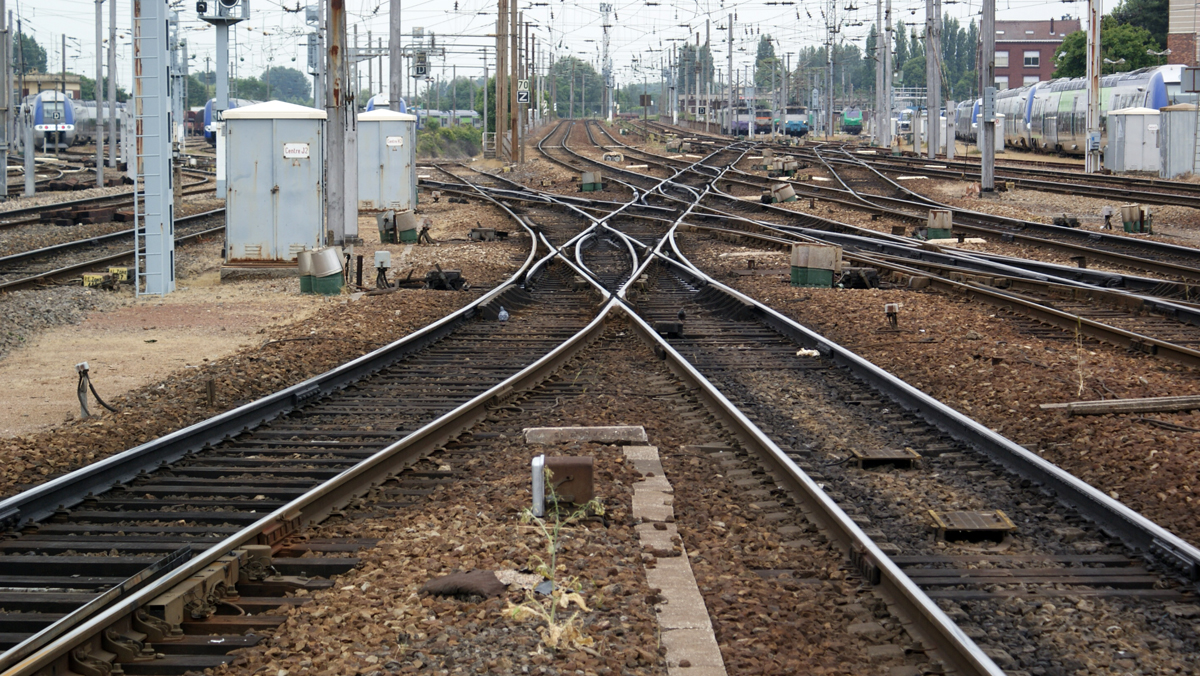
At exit of station (on the left stabling sidings for rolling stock. In the centre lines towards Lille and Paris. On the right locomotive depot.)

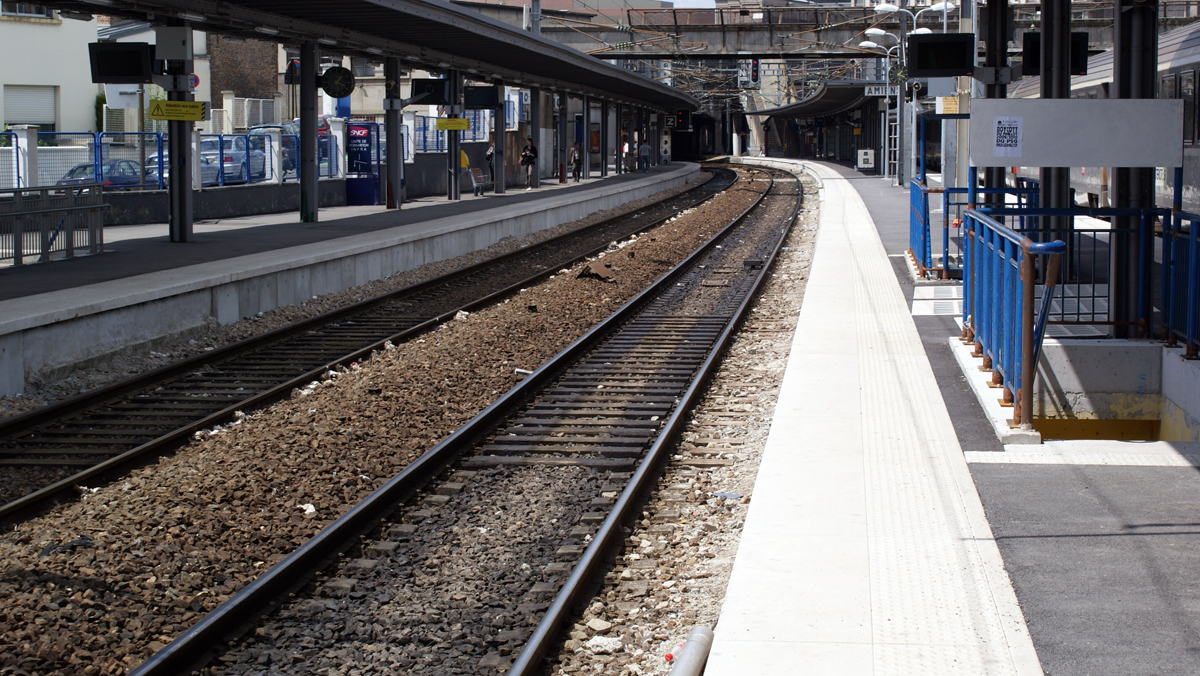
The Platform 1 and 2 resurfaced.

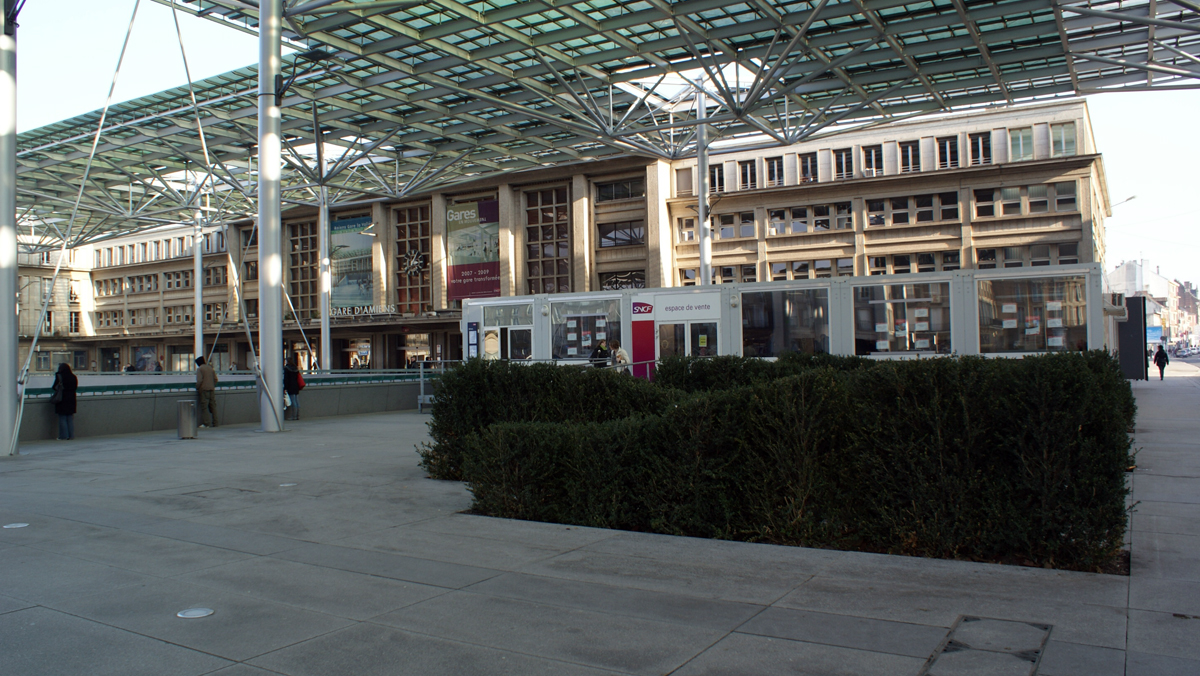
Hoarding with SNCF commercial advertising on the square of the station during work reconstruction.

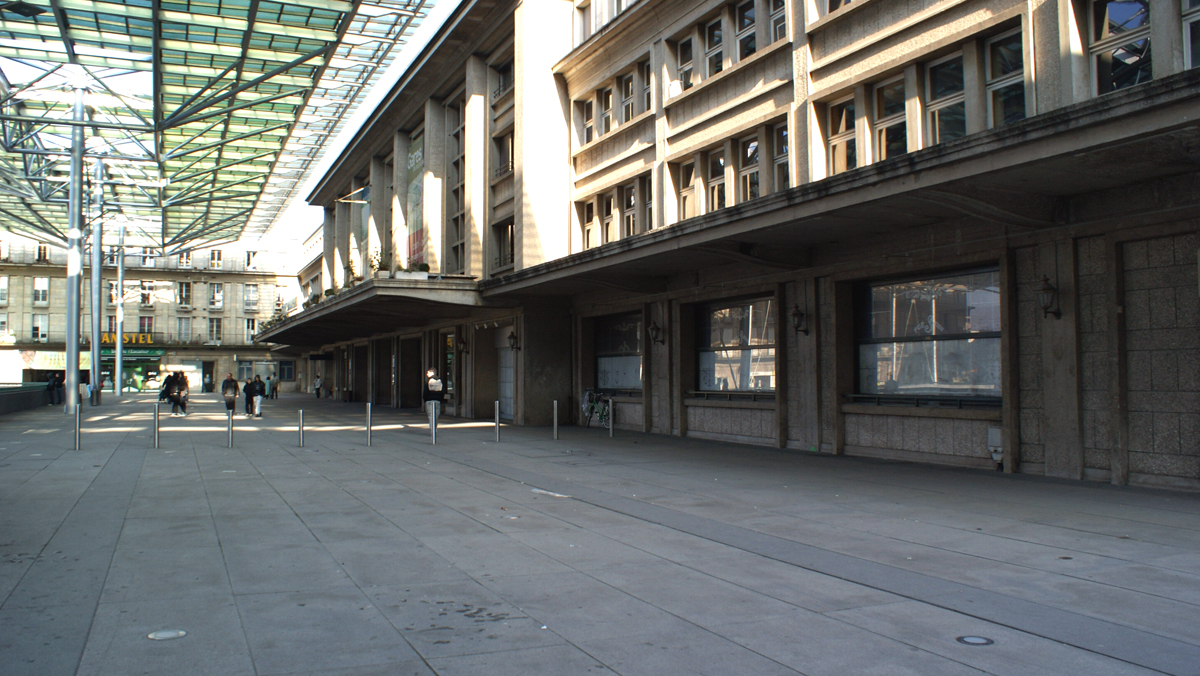
Main entrance of the station.

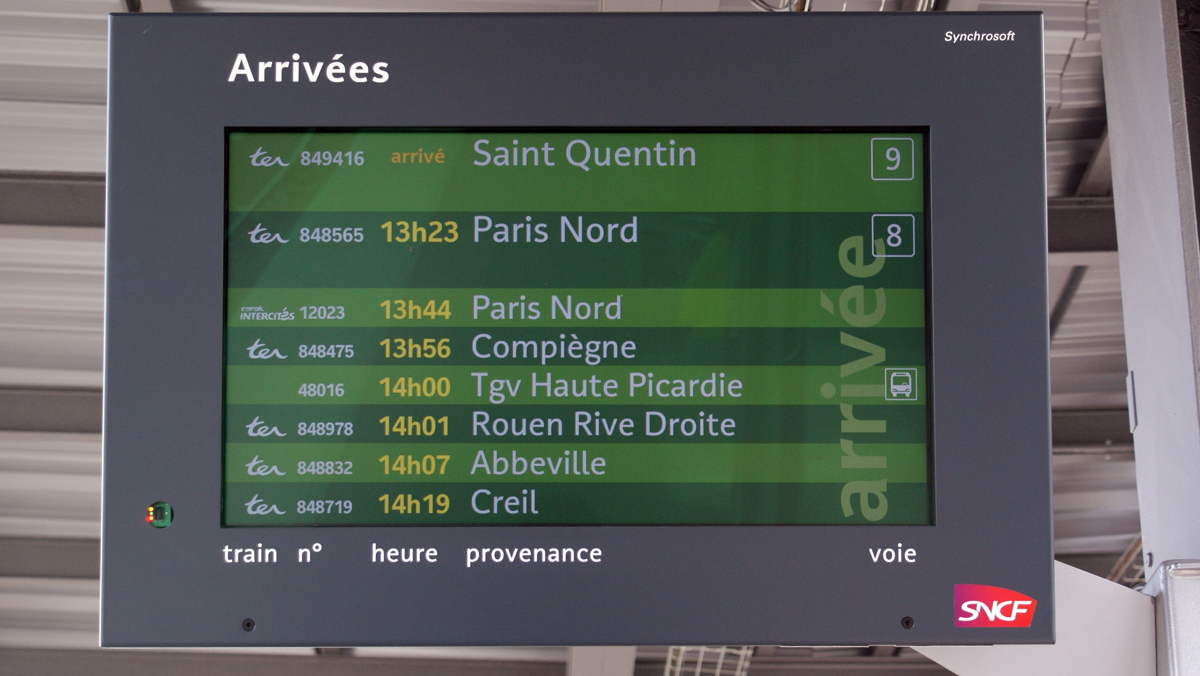
New system displaying train arrivals.

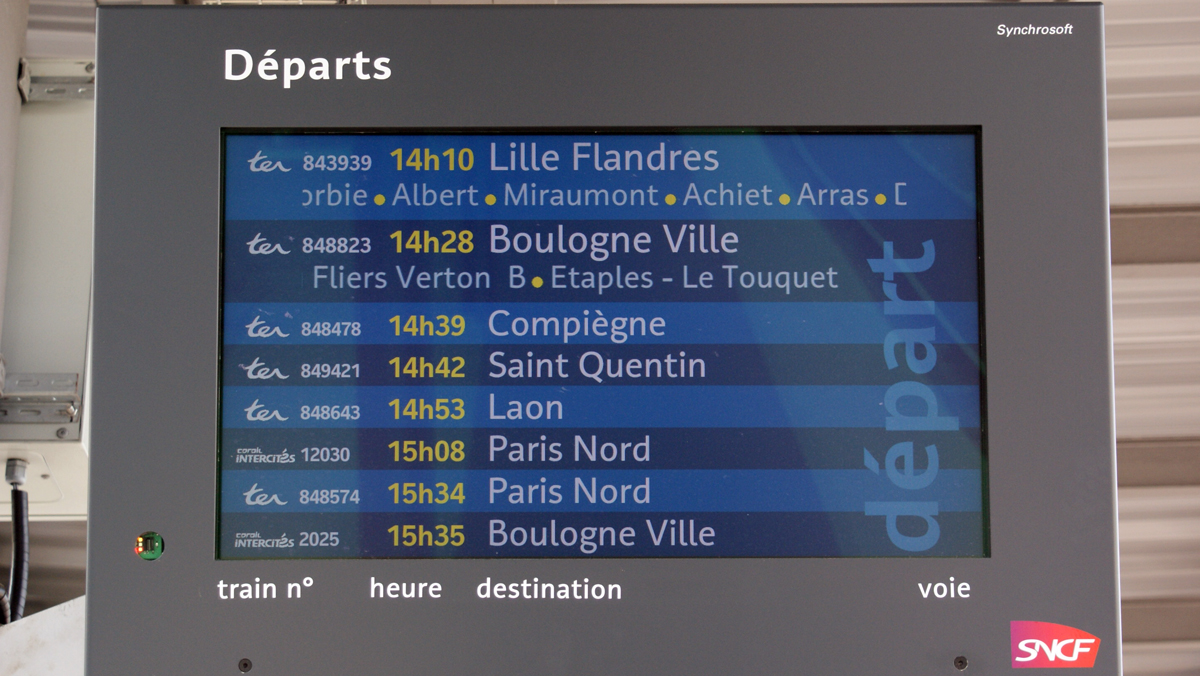
New system displaying train departures.

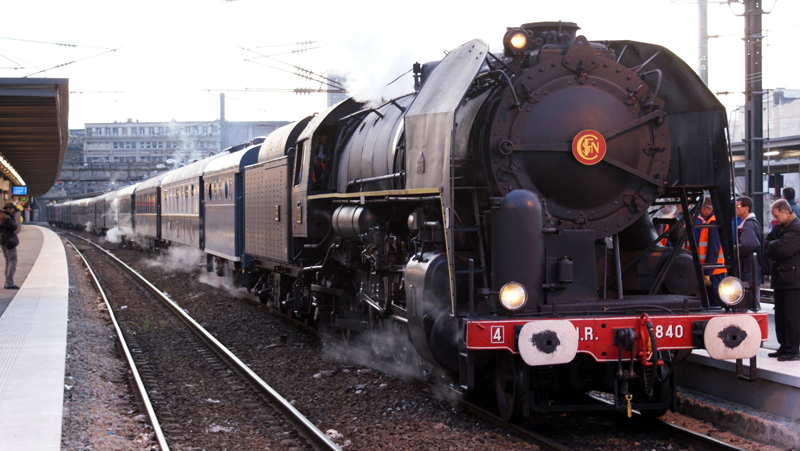
SNCF Class 141 R 180 passing through Amiens station.

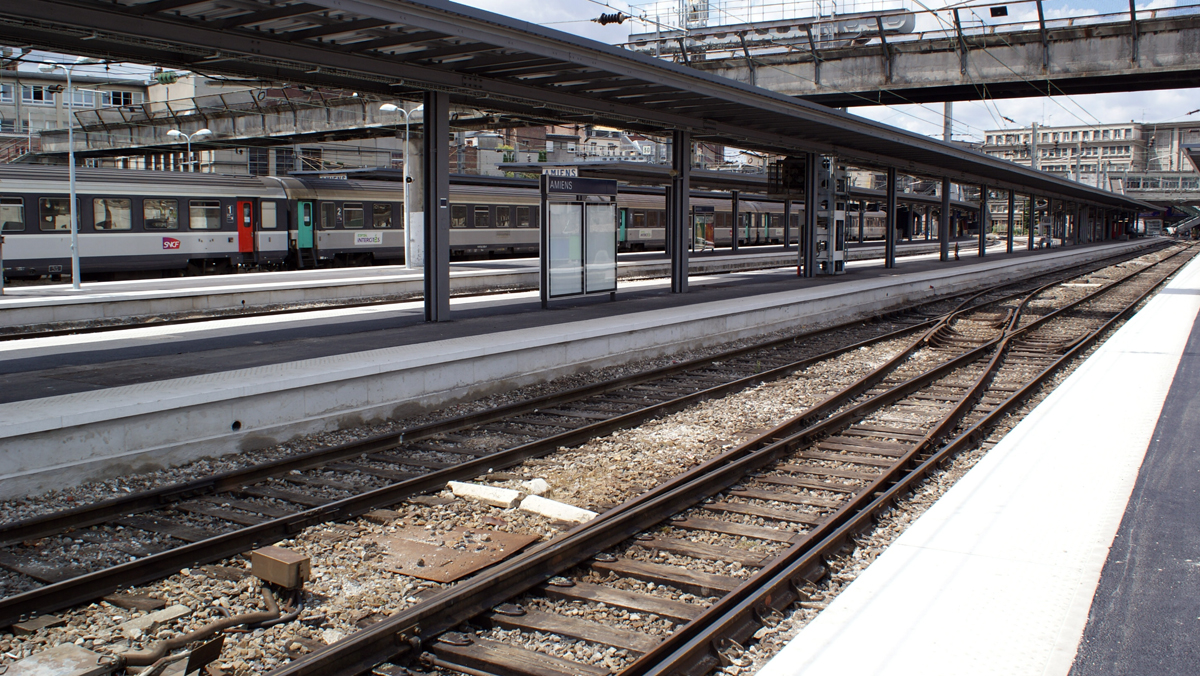
Restoration of the station platforms.

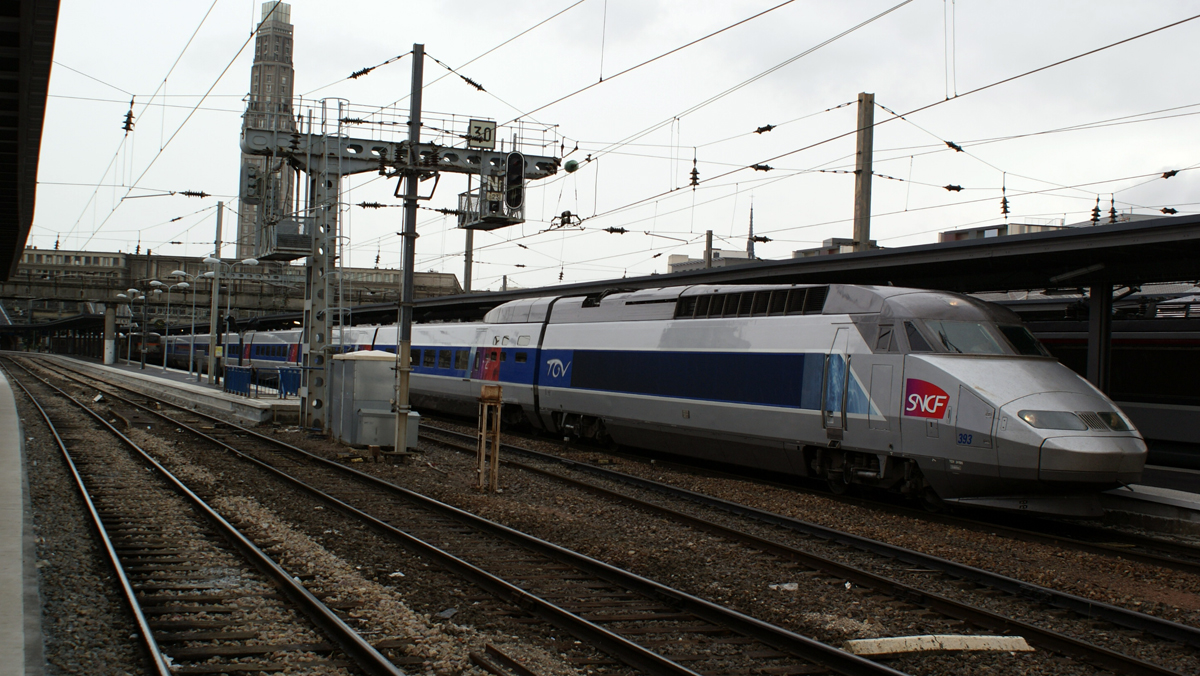
A very rare TGV in Amiens.

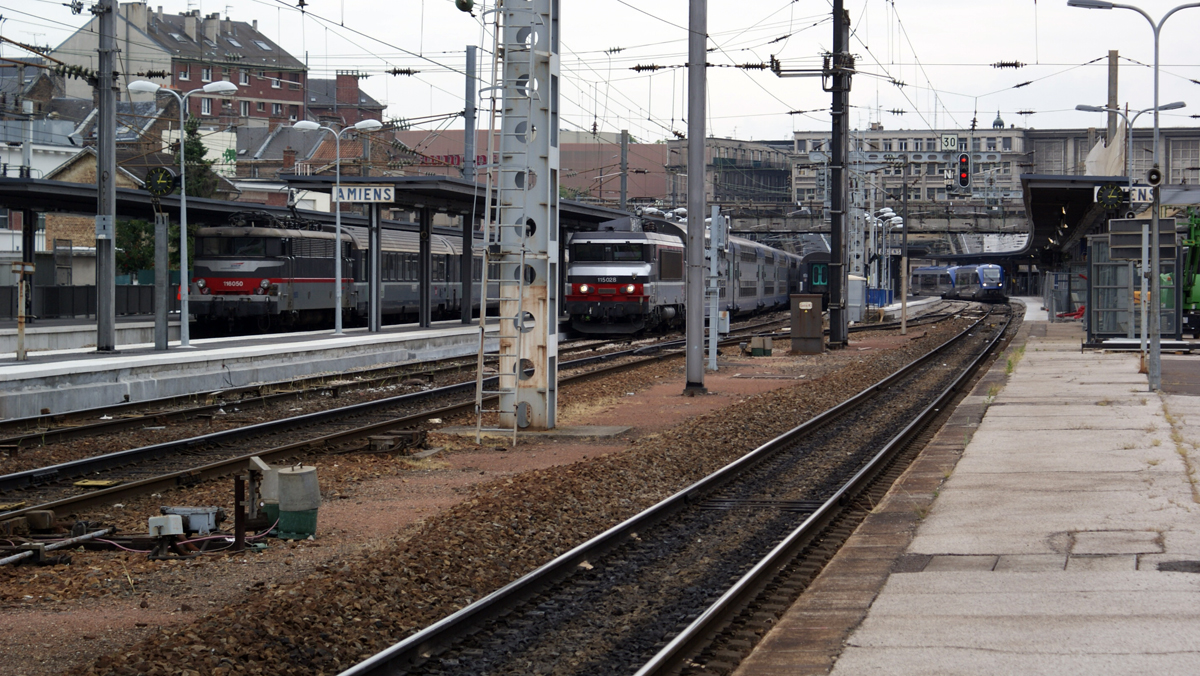
View of Platforms 1 2 3 and 4 of the station.

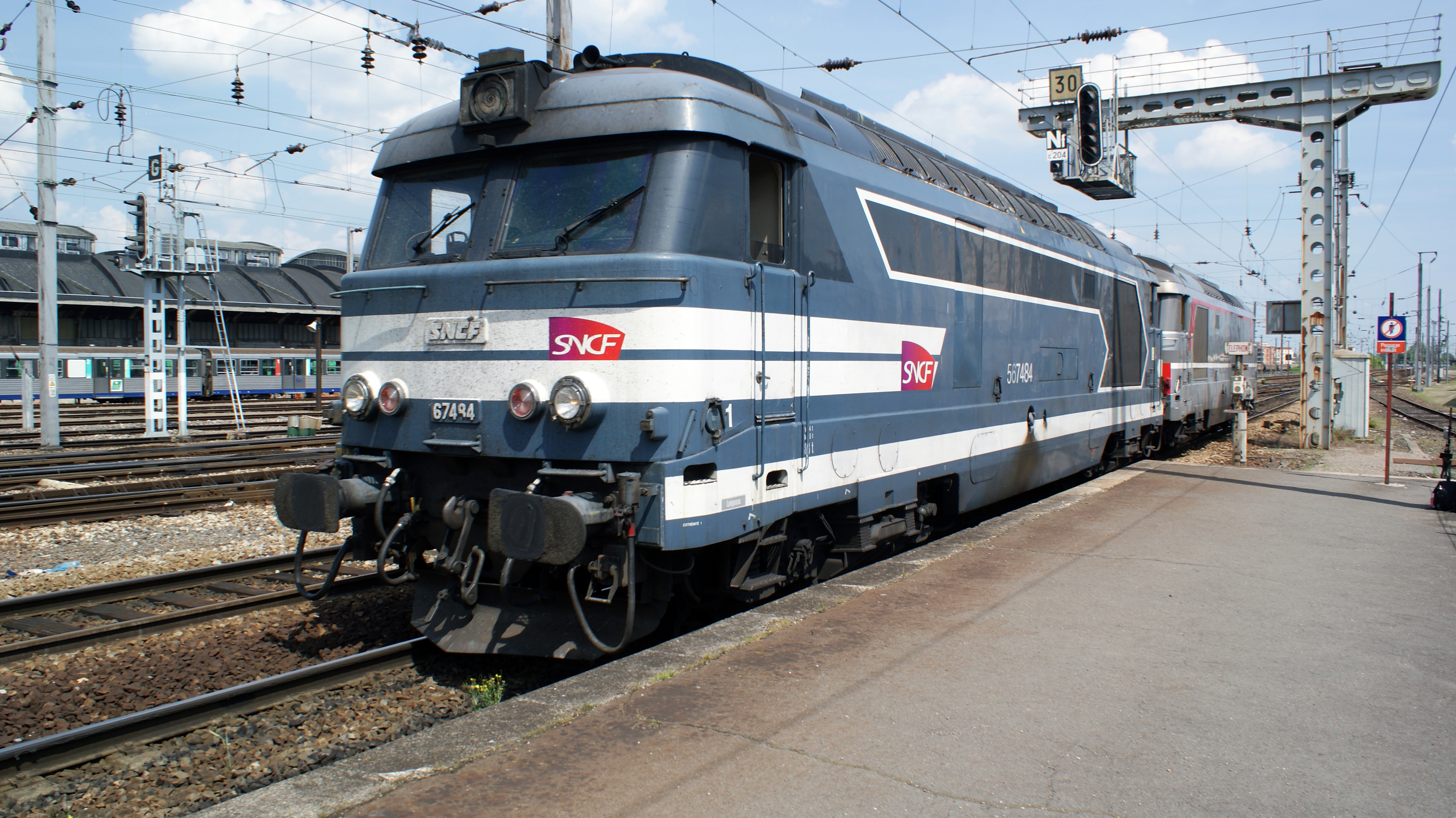
SNCF Class BB 67400 diesel locomotive being prepared for the Boulogne train.

== See also ==
- Amiens Saint-Roch station
