= Fosseuse =

- Part of Bornel
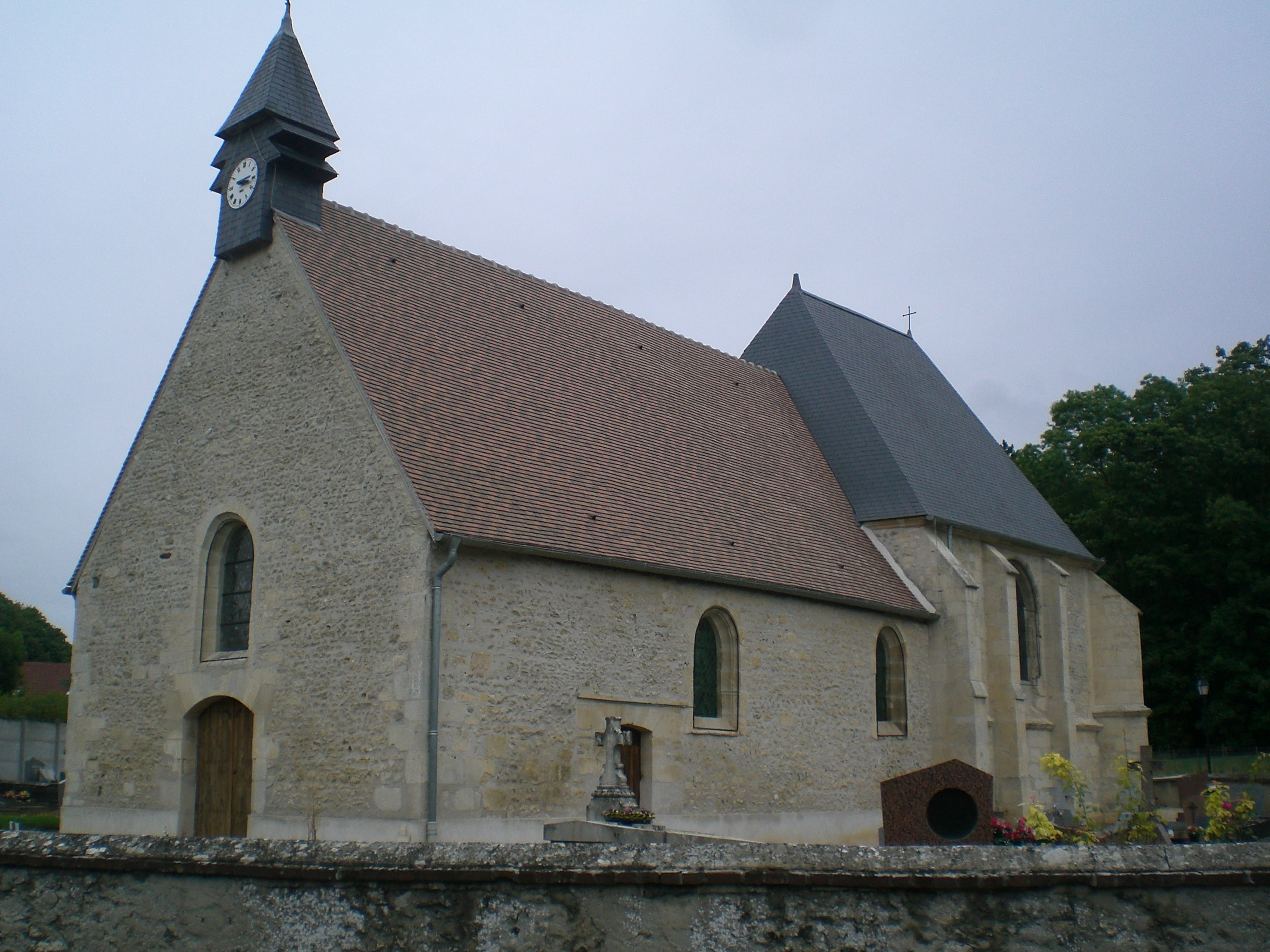
- Church of Fosseuse Oise France
- Location of Fosseuse
- Location within France Location within Hauts-de-France
- Coordinates: 49°12′51″N 2°11′12″E
- Country: France
- Region: Hauts-de-France
- Department: Oise
- Arrondissement: Beauvais
- Canton: Méru
- Commune: Bornel
- Area^{1}: 4.44 km^{2} (1.71 sq mi)
- Elevation: 67 m (220 ft)
- Highest elevation: 129 m (423 ft)
- Lowest elevation: 50 m (160 ft)
- Population (2019): 724
  - Density: 163/km^{2} (422/sq mi)
- Time zone: UTC+01:00 (CET)
  - Summer (DST): UTC+02:00 (CEST)
- Postal code: 60540
- ^{1} French Land Register data, which excludes lakes, ponds, glaciers > 1 km^{2} (0.386 sq mi or 247 acres) and river estuaries.

Fosseuse (French pronunciation: [fosøz]) is a former commune in the Oise department in northern France. On 1 January 2016, it was merged into the commune Bornel.

== See also ==
- Communes of the Oise department
