= Esches station =

French railway station

Esches
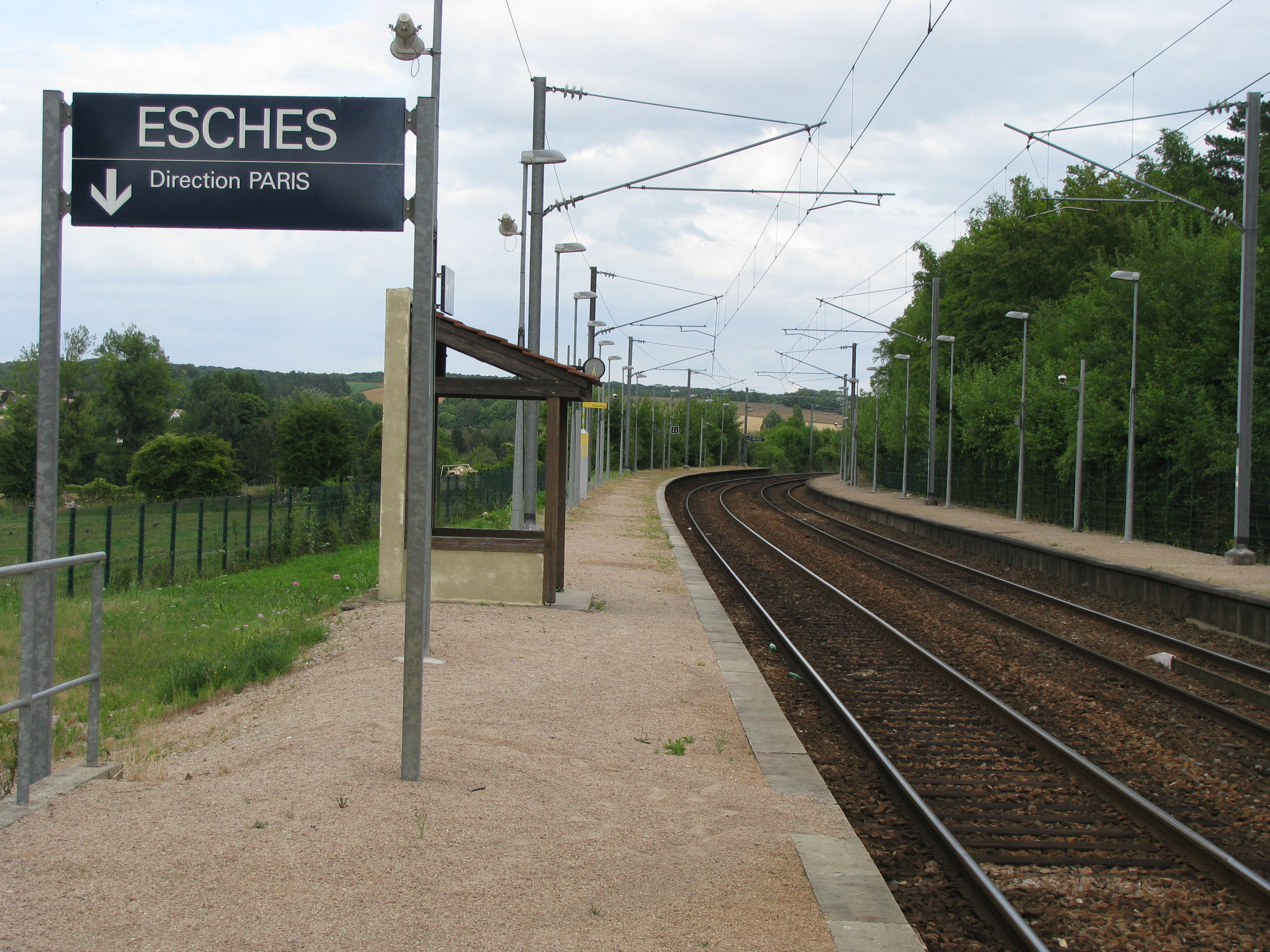
- Esches station and platforms.

General information
- Location: Esches, France
- Coordinates: 49°12′15″N 2°10′14″E
- Owner: SNCF
- Line: Épinay-Villetaneuse–Le Tréport-Mers railway

Other information
- Station code: 87272096

Services
Preceding station	TER Hauts-de-France	Following station
Bornel–Belle-Église towards Paris-Nord	Citi C17	Méru towards Beauvais
Location

Esches station (French: Gare d'Esches) is a railway station located between the communes of Amblainville and Esches (Oise department), France. It is served by TER Hauts-de-France trains from Paris-Nord to Beauvais.

== See also ==
- List of SNCF stations in Hauts-de-France
