= Bornel–Belle-Église station =

Railway station in Bornel, France

Bornel–Belle-Église
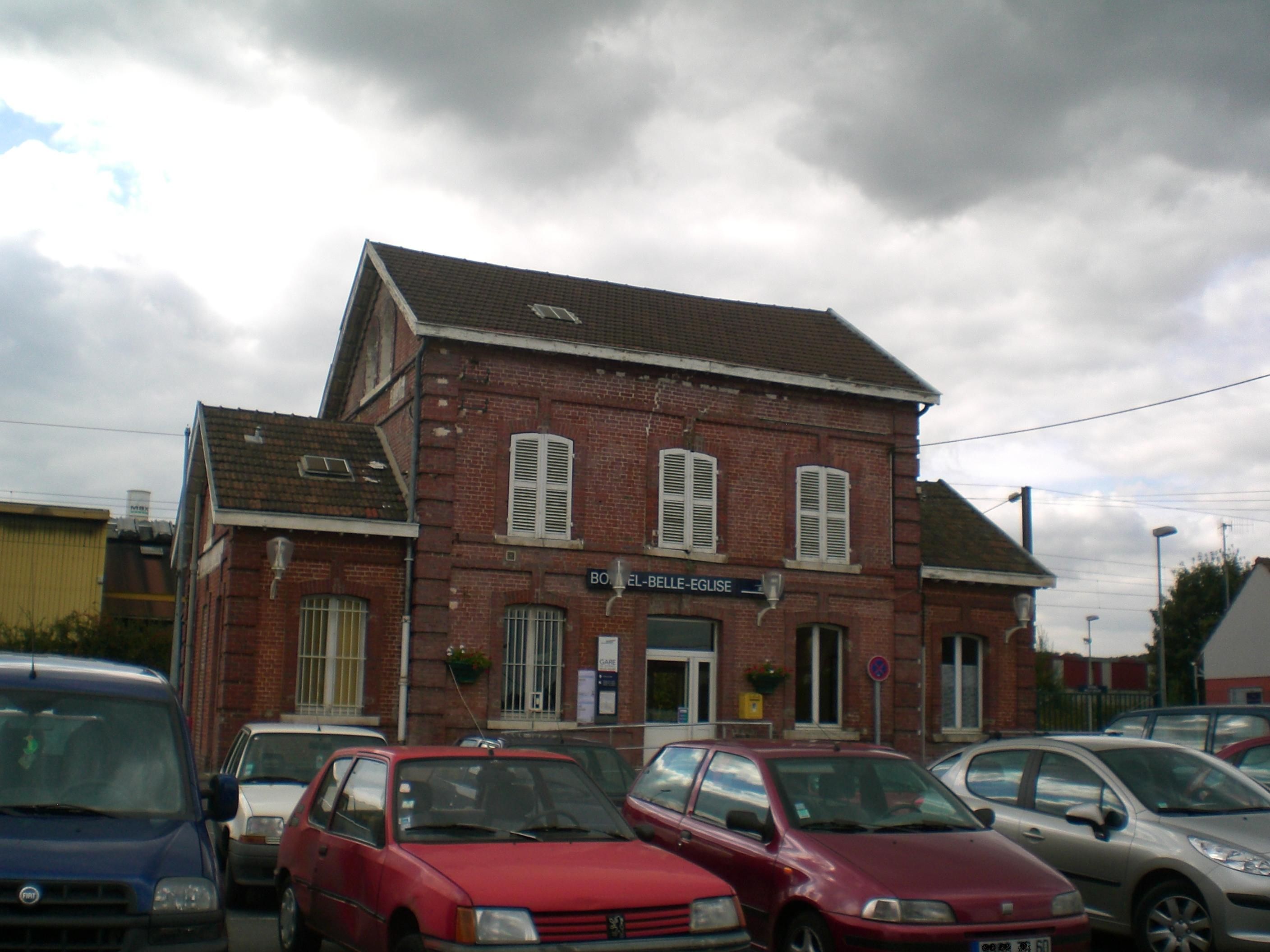
- The station in September 2008

General information
- Location: Bornel, France
- Coordinates: 49.1947°N 2.2072°E
- Owner: SNCF
- Line: Épinay-Villetaneuse–Le Tréport-Mers railway

Other information
- Station code: 87276717
- Fare zone: 5 (Orange Card)

Services
Preceding station	TER Hauts-de-France	Following station
Chambly towards Paris-Nord	Citi C17	Esches towards Beauvais
Location

Bornel–Belle-Église station (French: Gare de Bornel–Belle-Église) is a rail station located in the commune of Bornel (Oise department), France and serves nearby Belle-Église. It is served by TER Hauts-de-France trains from Paris-Nord to Beauvais.

== See also ==
- List of SNCF stations in Hauts-de-France

== Gallery ==
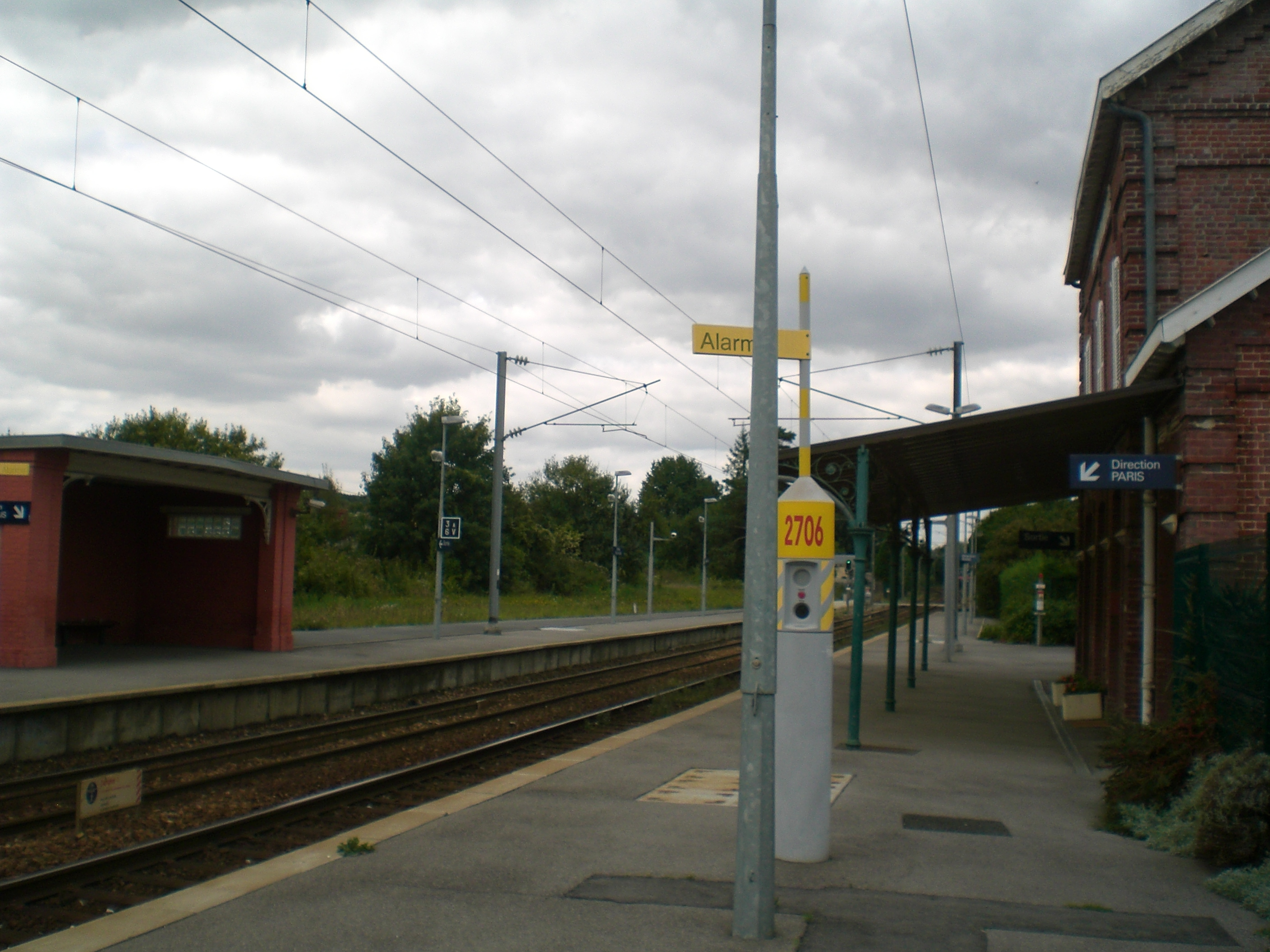
The station in September 2008

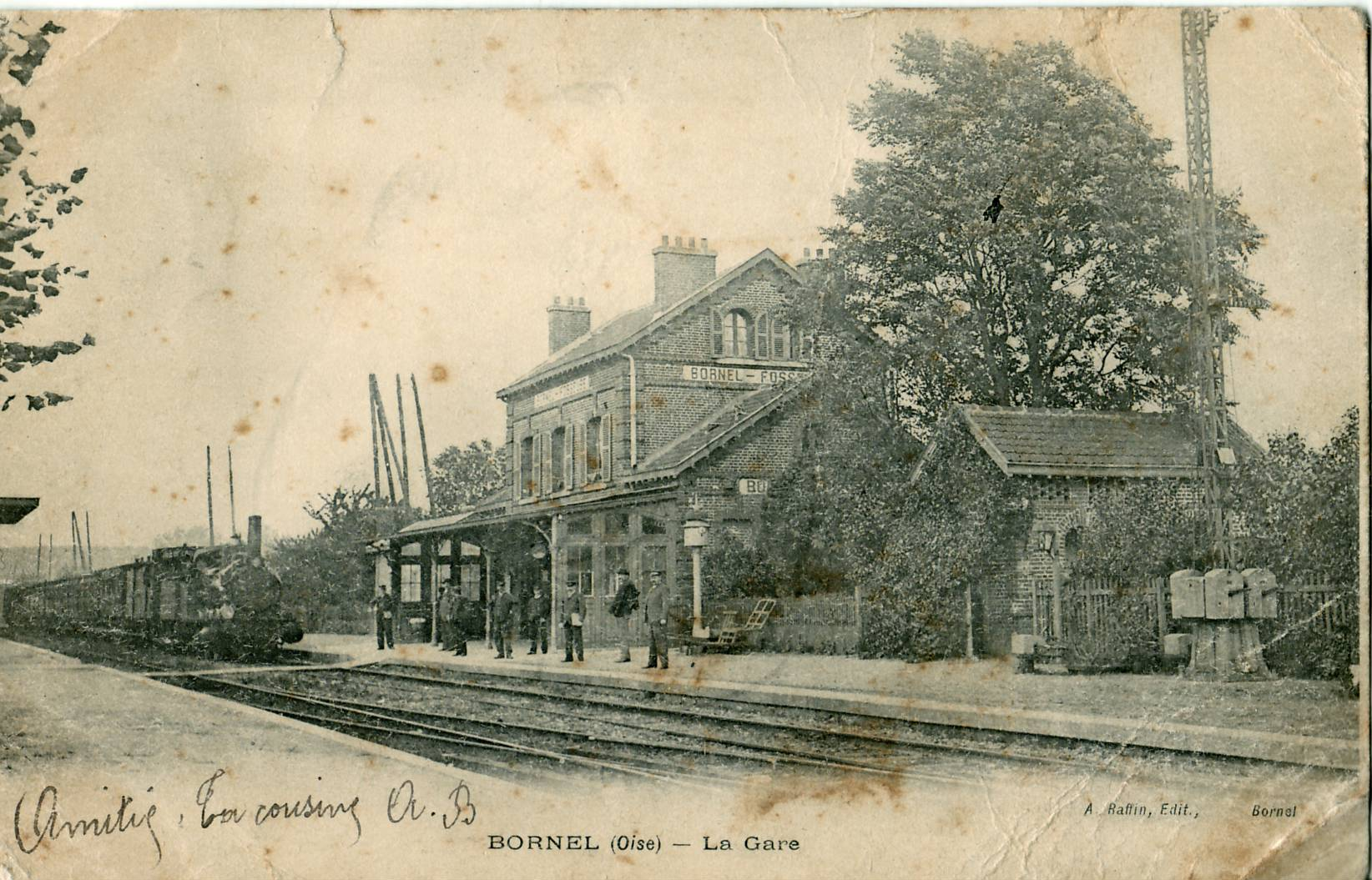
The station during World War II
