= Jacquy Haddouche =

French serial killer

- Born: 19 February 1964; Beauvais, France
- Died: 23 October 2010 (aged 46); Fresnes Prison, Fresnes, France
- Conviction: Murder x3
- Penalty: Life imprisonment with a minimum term of 22 years

Details
- Victims: 3+
- Span of crimes: 1992 – 2002 (confirmed); 1990 – 2002 (possible)
- Country: France
- States: Picardy, Nord-Pas-de-Calais, Rhône-Alpes
- Date apprehended: 2 October 2002

Jacquy Haddouche (19 February 1964 – 23 October 2010) was a French serial killer. He was convicted of three murders committed between 1992 and 2002 and sentenced to life imprisonment with a minimum term of 22 years.

== Biography ==
=== Youth ===
Haddouche's parents are Algerian. His mother's name is Djouber Azzouz and his father's name is Ahmed Haddouche, a soldier in the French army during the Algerian War; also known as a harki. In 1962, Ahmed was evacuated with his family to France. In Beauvais, in the Oise department, he found a job as a skilled worker at the Lockheed factory. He became an alcoholic and very violent, and was fired from his job.

Haddouche was born on February 19, 1964. He was the third of a twelve children family. He attended George Sand Middle School. He was considered intelligent and sensitive, but unstable, aggressive, impulsive, intolerant, manipulative, and unable to cope with frustration.

In 1979, at the age of 15, the juvenile court judge placed him in a supervised education centre in Méru. He regularly escaped to return to the family home. It was there that he witnessed a traumatic scene. Unable to bear the fact that his wife had filed for divorce and was leaving him, Ahmed Haddouche committed suicide by shooting himself in the head with a rifle in front of Jacquy, who was standing close by. He was splattered with blood and his father's body fell on top of him. Traumatised, he dropped out of school and sank into delinquency and drug addiction.

=== First series of crimes and incarcerations ===
In 1980, at the age of 16, Haddouche committed gang rape with a legionnaire ten years his senior. When he was arrested, Haddouche showed no remorse or guilt. He was charged with gang rape and placed in pre-trial detention. On 15 April 1981, the Beauvais Juvenile Court sentenced him to five years' imprisonment. He was released in 1984 after serving four years.

In 1984, Haddouche committed several armed and unarmed robberies. After yet another robbery, several reports led to his identification. Aged 20, Haddouche was arrested and charged with these offences, then placed in pre-trial detention. His trial took place in 1986 before the Assize Court for armed robbery and robbery with violence. Although he faced up to 20 years in prison, he benefited from mitigating circumstances and was sentenced to eight years' imprisonment. Incarcerated at the Liancourt Penitentiary, Haddouche married in 1988 at his mother's instigation.

=== Release and second series of crimes ===
Haddouche was released in 1990 after six years in prison and moved in with his wife. Their marriage lasted another eight months before ending in divorce. Haddouche proved to be a smooth talker. He knew how to gain the trust of the people he met in order to deceive them. He easily fell in love with his female conquests, but had a violent temper towards his partners.

On the night of 30 November 1992, in Beauvais, Haddouche met Gilles Canette, a 45-year-old French teacher who was divorced and depressed, in the lift. They chatted, and Gilles Canette invited Haddouche to his flat. Around 7 p.m., two boys, students of Gilles, came to talk to him. The teenagers noticed that Haddouche was behaving strangely, as if he were inspecting the rooms of the apartment. They left around 8 p.m. Haddouche spent the evening at Gilles's place. He poisoned Gilles Canette with an antidepressant, cyamemazine, and killed him by asphyxiation. At midnight, Gilles Canette's bank card is used at an ATM. When Gilles wanted money from his account, he always went to the bank to withdraw it; he never used his card at an ATM. On the morning of 1 December, Haddouche goes to see the two teenagers at their home and threatens them to make them say that he was not at Gilles Canette's house the night before. An hour later, Gilles was found naked on his bed by his housekeeper. The police found Haddouche's fingerprint on a bottle of strawberry syrup. He was suspected of the murder. He admitted to having been to Gilles Canette's house before, but not on the date of the murder.

On 13 December 1993, Haddouche was taken into custody. He denied the allegations and stated that he had been in the Paris region at the home of Cloé, his partner of 20 years. Cloé arrived at the police station at just the right moment and confirmed his alibi. When the police asked her for further details, she refused to answer their questions and left the police station. In his police cell, Haddouche attempt suicide by slitting his wrists with his lighter and was hospitalised. With the police custody period expired and the police lacking sufficient evidence to prove Haddouche's guilt, the court dropped the charges against him and the case was closed. The case was dismissed on 1 September 1994.

On the night of 18 to 19 September 1994, Haddouche persuaded Cloé to steal her father's prescriptions. She used them to slip rohypnol, commonly known as the ‘date rape drug’, into the drink of Ludovic J., a Parisian student friend, without his knowledge. She then let Haddouche into the flat. Armed with the victim's bank card and PIN, the couple then made purchases and withdrew money. Ashamed of her behaviour and psychologically devastated after a year with Haddouche, Cloé ended the relationship. Ludovic survived the poisoning and filed a complaint for attempted murder and theft. The victim stated that he had invited Cloé and her lover to his home, but said he did not know the latter's name. Investigators then searched Cloé's circle of friends and discovered that her partner was Haddouche, with whom she had separated just after the incident. The former couple's phone calls were tapped for several months.

At the end of May 1995, Francine C., educational director at a medical-educational institute, was with a group of friends at the Charlie Brown bar on Rue Guy Patin in Beauvais. Haddouche joined the group and got to know them. In early June, Haddouche showed up at Francine's house on Rue Nicolas Pastour, but she refused to let him in. He banged on the front door so hard that she finally decided to open it and let him in. Haddouche told her he was exhausted because he had just finished a shift at the hospital of Méru. Sympathetic, she offered him the coffee he asked for. When he finished drinking, Francine told him to leave. Haddouche refused, claiming that Collette, his former partner, was now with Frédéric, her former partner. Haddouche took her to the bedroom, raped her and left. She threw away the sheets and washed the areas where Haddouche had been in her home with bleach. Over the following weeks, Haddouche harasses her on the phone and watches outside her door. She does not dare to report him and sinks into depression.

=== Imprisonment for robbery with violence ===
In 1995, Haddouche, aged 31, and Cloé, aged 22, were taken into custody for poisoning Ludovic. Cloé admitted to having played a role in poisoning and robbing the victim, but claimed to have been influenced by Haddouche. Haddouche, for his part, remained impassive and denied poisoning his victim. During an identification parade, Ludovic J. recognised Haddouche behind a two-way mirror. At the end of his police custody, Haddouche was charged with attempted murder and robbery, then placed in pre-trial detention. Cloé, meanwhile, was charged with complicity in robbery with violence and released.

While in prison, Haddouche was sentenced in 1996 to three months, four months and six months in prison for theft, aggravated theft and counterfeiting. In June 1997, he was sentenced to two years in prison for fraud and aggravated theft. The poisoning case was ultimately reclassified as robbery with violence as a repeat offence for Haddouche, and as complicity in theft for Cloé.

In 1998, Haddouche and Cloé appeared before the criminal court for the poisoning of Ludovic J., accompanied by theft. Haddouche was sentenced to eight years in prison, while Cloé received a suspended prison sentence. Following this case, Cloé cut off all contact with Haddouche and took ten years to rebuild her life.

=== Release and third series of crimes ===
Haddouche was released in February 2002 after more than six years in prison. He returned to live in Beauvais, where he had a reputation as a marginalised individual.

In June, in Beauvais, Haddouche reconnected with Isabelle, whom he had met in 1991. They began a brief relationship. One evening, Haddouche, who was drunk, hit Isabelle in the face in front of her daughter. He called her the next day and asked her to bring him his heart medication, claiming that he was dying. When Isabelle arrived at his home, he forced her to have sex with him.

On 20 June, at around 7 p.m., Haddouche entered the SONACOTRA hostel on Rue d'Anjou in the Argentine neighbourhood of Beauvais. At around 8 p.m., he forced open the door to the studio apartment of Léo Capon, a 73-year-old pensioner. Haddouche struck and slit the old lady's throat. He searched the apartment and stole items of little value. Worried, Capon's daughter Danièle went to her mother's house. She was surprised to find that the front door was unlocked. Everything had been ransacked, and items were scattered everywhere. There were numerous bloodstains on the floor and rubbish bags filled with various items near the front door. Capon's body is lying on her back in the bathroom, her face covered with pieces of cardboard. On the building's CCTV footage, a balding man with a springy gait is seen carrying full bags in each hand and wearing a cap that hides his face. The poor quality of the images makes it impossible to identify him. Male DNA is discovered on various objects in Léo's home. This DNA is not listed in the FNAEG. Capon is disfigured by the blows she received. Forensic scientists determine that she died from suffocation caused by her own blood.

On 4 July, in Boulogne-sur-Mer, Haddouche enters the apartment of Liliane D., owner of a bar. He hits her, attempts to rape her, and steals the establishment's takings. The victim files a complaint against X for attempted rape, but the investigation does not yield any leads.

On 15 July, at the bar L'endroit in Saint-Étienne, Sylvain Rome, a 32-year-old cameraman, sympathized with Haddouche at the counter. Around 4:00 pm, they left the bar together, Rome later buying drinks at the superette next to his home. Around 5:00 pm, David Sabido, a friend of Rome, came to his apartment, but Rome made him understand that he was bothering him and refused to let Sabido in. Haddouche later poisoned Rome with Bromazepam and stabbed him. He cleans the flat, steals Sylvain Rome's cheque book, mobile phone, identity papers and keys to the flat. On 27, Sylvain Rome's father finds him lying face down on his bed. Investigators determine that Rome had a high blood alcohol level, was not depressed and did not consume antidepressants. A facial composite was made thanks to the descriptions of the bartender and Lucien Florent, a customer of the bar, with whom Haddouche spoke a little before meeting Rome.

At the end of August, Haddouche seduces Nathalie, a young beneficiary of the RMI, introducing himself under a false name as a doctor at the Beauvais hospital. She lets him stay with her. After a week, while they are having an aperitif, Haddouche drugs Nathalie without her knowledge in her second glass of kir. He then steals her bank card and her income support. Nathalie feels unwell and is hospitalised again. She files a complaint against X at the Beauvais police station for ‘poisoning accompanied by theft’. In September, Haddouche attempted to contact Francine again. Panicked at the thought of being harassed again, she decided to file a complaint against him for the 1995 rape.

On 13 September, in the Argentine neighbourhood of Beauvais, Liliane Michaud, 82, who requires a walker to get around, was returning from the supermarket Intermarché. After arriving at her pavilion, Haddouche attacked her, savagely beating her and stealing her wallet. When the investigators described the abuser to the supermarket security agents, they positively identified Haddouche. On 30 September, the police left a summons at his home, a small furnished flat. Haddouche did not respond to the summons.

=== Arrest and charges in different cases ===
On the night of 2 October 2002, shortly after 11 p.m., in Nîmes in the Gard department, Haddouche attempted to break into the train station by smashing a window. A security guard chased him away and alerted the police on patrol. The police spotted him in the street. He was drunk and resisted arrest. He claimed to be a kinesiotherapist and said his name was Saïd Haddouche. When the police ran his fingerprints through the automated fingerprint database, they discovered that his first name was Jacquy, not Saïd. When they ran his name through the wanted persons database, they learned that he was wanted for murder in Beauvais. Michaud formally identified Haddouche, who was charged with repeat violent robbery and placed in pre-trial detention at the Osny-Pontoise remand centre.

On 2 December, Haddouche was taken into custody for the murder of Capon. He denied committing the crime, but his denials were not taken seriously. Personal belongings and plates belonging to the murdered elderly woman were found at Haddouche's home. In addition, DNA found at the crime scene matched his. The following evening, Haddouche was charged with Capon's murder and taken back to Osny-Pontoise Prison. He denied the charges. Items he had stolen from her home were found by police when they searched his flat. Haddouche accused his flatmate of being the perpetrator.

On 10 December, Haddouche was sentenced to eight years in prison by the Beauvais Criminal Court for the assault on Liliane Michaud. Given Haddouche's profile, the investigating judge was convinced that the murder of Capon was not the only one he had committed. In early 2003, she therefore decided to issue an information circular to all police stations in France. The Saint-Étienne gendarmerie reviewed the file and examined Haddouche's mobile phone records. These showed that the suspect's mobile phone was detected by the cell site covering the neighbourhood whereRome's apartment was located on the date of the murder.

On 1 June 2003, Haddouche was taken into custody at the Saint-Étienne gendarmerie. He admitted to having been in the area in mid-July 2002 to visit family members. During the police lineup, behind a beam splitter, Florent formally identified Haddouche. He eventually admitted to having met Sylvain Rome at the bar, but claimed never to have been to his home. He was charged with murder and transferred to Lyon-Corbas Prison.

With the help of the circular, a connection is made with the attempted rape of Liliane D., committed in Boulogne-sur-Mer in July 2002. The victim formally identifies Haddouche during a line-up. When questioned about the 1995 rape, Haddouche admitted to having met Francine C. at the Charlie Brown bar, but denied having gone to her home. He claimed that the rape complaint against him was an act of revenge on her part because he had not delivered the drugs she had ordered from him for 30,000 francs. Haddouche was charged with the repeat rape of Francine C. and the attempted repeat rape of Liliane D., then returned to Lyon-Corbas Prison.

In view of the two murders and the attempted rape, committed in less than a month, the investigators doubted that Haddouche had started killing in 2002 and decided to look into his past. In 2003, they dug up his police records and came across the 1992 death of Gilles Canette in 1992, in which he had been heard as a witness and suspect. When questioned again about the case, Cloé admitted to the investigating judge that she had lied: she did not know Haddouche in November 1992 and only met him in September 1993, when she started school in Beauvais.

In 2004, Haddouche was once again taken into custody for the murder of Canette. As in 1993, he denied responsibility for her death and gave the same alibi, ignoring Cloé's retractions. When confronted with his inconsistencies, Haddouche claimed that Cloé was lying to get revenge for having involved him in the poisoning of Ludovic J. in 1994. More than 11 years after the events, Haddouche was charged with Canette's murder and returned to Lyon-Corbas Prison.

=== Judgement in the murder of Sylvain Rome ===
On 26 March 2007, Haddouche's trial began at the Loire Assize Court in Saint-Étienne.

He was defended by lawyers Karim Beylouni and Julien Vernet. André Buffard is the lawyer for Sylvain Rome's family. During the trial, Haddouche appears weakened and empathetic due to heavy medication use. He admits to having spent the afternoon of the incident with Rome. He continues to deny his involvement in the murder and accuses the justice system of persecuting him by wrongfully prosecuting him.

On 28 March, Haddouche was sentenced to 30 years' imprisonment, with a minimum term of 20 years, for the murder of Sylvain Rome. He appealed against this decision but decided to abstain on the first day of his retrial.

=== First instance trial for the Beauvais crimes ===
On 23 April 2008, Haddouche's trial began at the Assize Court of Oise in Beauvais for the murder of Gilles Canette in 1992, the rape of Francine in 1995, the murder of Léo Capon in 2002, and the attempted rape of Liliane in the same year. Antoine Vaast was the lawyer for Gilles Canette's family. Philippe Tabart was the lawyer for Léo Capon's family. Virginie Bella-Gamba was Francine's lawyer.

When he arrives in the dock, Haddouche continues to deny committing the crimes and claims to be the victim of a conspiracy. Faced with the presence of his DNA at the scene of Léo Capon's murder, he claims that the police planted it there to get him wrongfully convicted. When Liliane D. arrives in the dock, she once again identifies Haddouche as her attacker. He does not admit to the attempted rape and accuses the victim of wanting to have him wrongfully convicted. Regarding the murder of Canette, Cloé testifies about her year-long relationship with Haddouche and claims to have been used to protect him from his crimes. She recounts how she lied in 1993 to protect the man she considered a protective figure. She also recounts how she was used to participate in the poisoning of Ludovic J. in 1994, for which she was convicted along with Haddouche and decided to cut ties with him.

At the bar, several of Haddouche's former partners testify about their relationship with him. They all describe him as a ‘smooth talker’ who knows how to gain the trust of the people he meets in order to manipulate them. Isabelle testified about an assault and rape committed by Haddouche in June 2002. She described him as affable at first glance, but uncontrollable when he drank or was faced with rejection. Nathalie also testified that she had been abused by Haddouche in August 2002. Seduced by him while she was in hospital, she claims to have taken in the man she believed to be a doctor for a few days, before he drugged her and stole her savings. She claims to have recognised Haddouche from the press and from his ability to drug his victims in order to extort money from them. When Francine C. came forward to testify about her rape in 1995, she described the same manipulative man who seduced her and asked for help to gain her trust. After being trapped and raped by Haddouche, she admitted to having been harassed by him on the phone for several weeks. Haddouche's criminal record shows that he stopped harassing her because of his arrest in the poisoning case.

On 7 May, Haddouche was sentenced to life imprisonment with a minimum term of 22 years, accompanied by 20 years of socio-judicial supervision and compulsory treatment. He appealed against this decision.

=== Appeal trial concerning the Beauvais crimes ===
On 9 March 2009, Haddouche's appeal trial began at the Assize Court of the Somme in Amiens.

When he arrived in court, Haddouche admitted to the murder of Léo Capon and the attempted rape of Liliane D., which he had always denied until then. He admitted to drinking a lot of alcohol on the days of the crimes and claimed that he had been unable to control himself. This argument left the court feeling uneasy, frightened by his ability to kill without reason. Although he admitted to these two crimes, Haddouche still vehemently denied the murder of Gilles Canette in 1992 and the rape of Francine C. in 1995.

Although the evidence was indisputable in the crimes of 1995 and 2002, the murder of Canette was less clear-cut for the court. Indeed, the evidence against him stems solely from a false alibi provided by Cloé. The testimony of two former students of Canette's dispels these uncertainties when they recount going to Canette's apartment with Haddouche on the evening of the incident. They claim to have seen Haddouche searching the residence and behaving strangely during the evening. The two men also claim that Haddouche approached them the morning after the incident and asked them to say that he had not spent the night at Canette's, who was found dead an hour later.

On 20 March, Haddouche was again sentenced to life imprisonment with a minimum term of 22 years. He appealed to the Court of Cassation, but his appeal was rejected.

=== Death ===
On 23 October 2010, Haddouche died of a cerebral haemorrhage at Fresnes Prison in Val-de-Marne, at the age of 46. He had spent 25 years of his life in detention.

Even today, there is still doubt about the exact number of his victims. Some people remain convinced that Haddouche committed other crimes between 1990 and 1995, during his period of freedom.

== List of known victims ==
| Date | | Place | Identity | Age | Profession / Activity |
| Facts | Discovery | Place | Identity | Age | Profession / Activity |
|---|---|---|---|---|---|
| 30 November 1992 | 1 December 1992 | Beauvais | Gilles Canette | 45 | French teacher |
| 19 September 1994 | 19 September 1994 | Paris | Ludovic J. | ? | Student |
| June 1995 | September 2002 | Beauvais | Francine C. | ? | Educational Director of an IME |
| June 2002 | 26 April 2008 | Beauvais | Isabelle | ? | Unknown |
| 20 June 2002 | 21 June 2002 | Beauvais | Léo Capon | 73 | Retired |
| 4 July 2002 | 4 July 2002 | Boulogne-sur-Mer | Liliane D. | ? | Bar owner |
| 15 July 2002 | 27 July 2002 | Saint-Étienne | Sylvain Rome | 32 | Cameraman |
| August 2002 | August 2002 | Beauvais | Nathalie | ? | Beneficiary of the RMI |
| 13 September 2002 | 13 September 2002 | Beauvais | Liliane Michaud | 82 | Retired |

== TV documentary ==
- "Jacquy Haddouche, At the chance of crime" 2 May 2010 in Get the accused presented by Christophe Hondelatte on France 2.

== Radio show ==
- "Jacquy Haddouche" 21 March 2018 in Hondelatte tells presented by Christophe Hondelatte on Europe 1.

== See also ==
- List of serial killers by country
