= Anserville =

- Part of Bornel
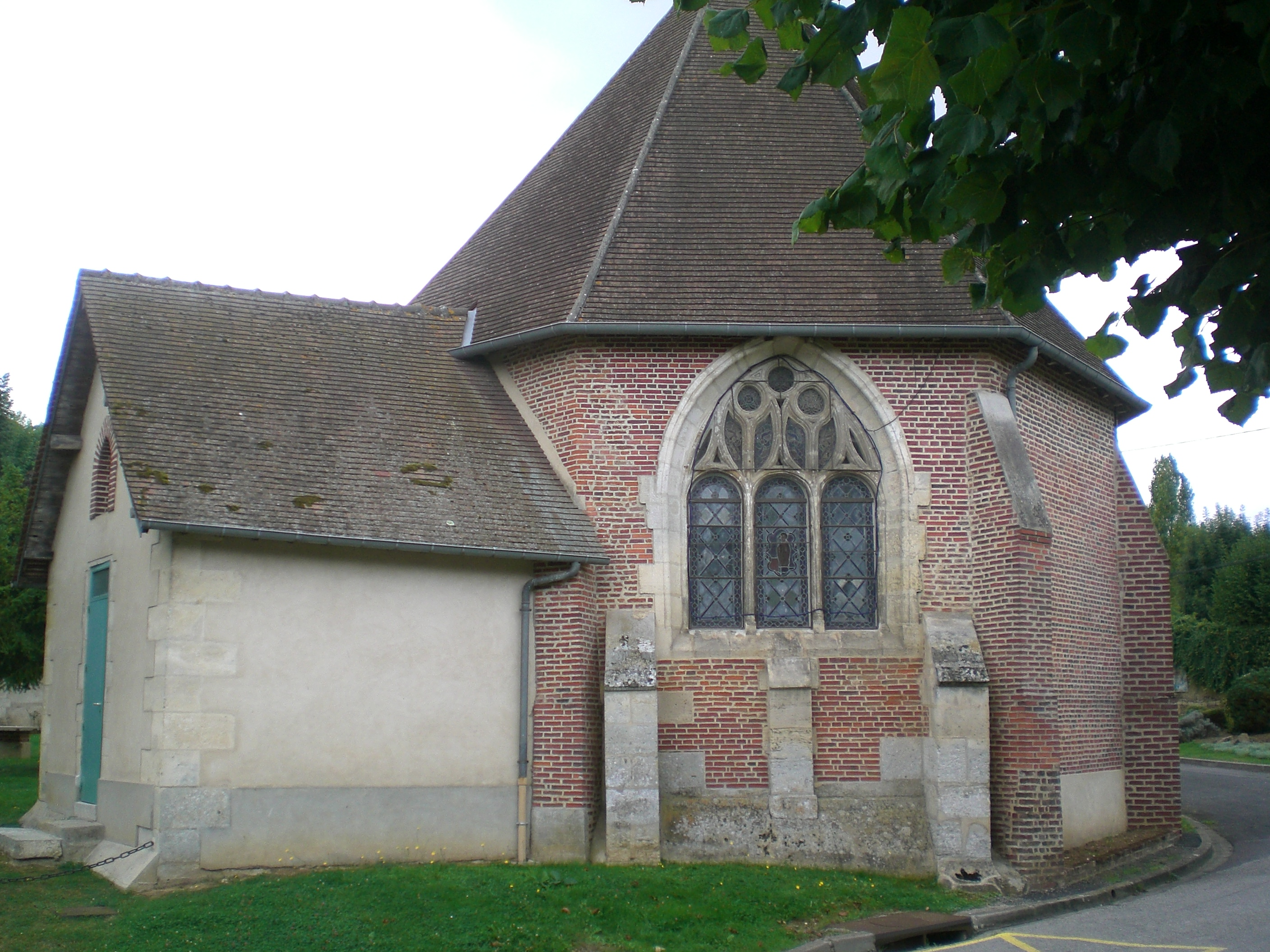
- Church of St. Nicholas
- Location of Anserville
- Location within France Location within Hauts-de-France
- Coordinates: 49°13′38″N 2°12′39″E
- Country: France
- Region: Hauts-de-France
- Department: Oise
- Arrondissement: Beauvais
- Canton: Méru
- Commune: Bornel
- Area^{1}: 4.44 km^{2} (1.71 sq mi)
- Elevation: 150 m (490 ft)
- Highest elevation: 129 m (423 ft)
- Lowest elevation: 50 m (160 ft)
- Population (2019): 470
  - Density: 110/km^{2} (270/sq mi)
- Time zone: UTC+01:00 (CET)
  - Summer (DST): UTC+02:00 (CEST)
- Postal code: 60540
- ^{1} French Land Register data, which excludes lakes, ponds, glaciers > 1 km^{2} (0.386 sq mi or 247 acres) and river estuaries.

Anserville (French pronunciation: [ɑ̃sɛʁvil]) is a former commune in the Oise department in northern France. On 1 January 2016, it was merged into the commune Bornel.

== See also ==
- Communes of the Oise department
