= Fresnoy-en-Thelle =

- Commune
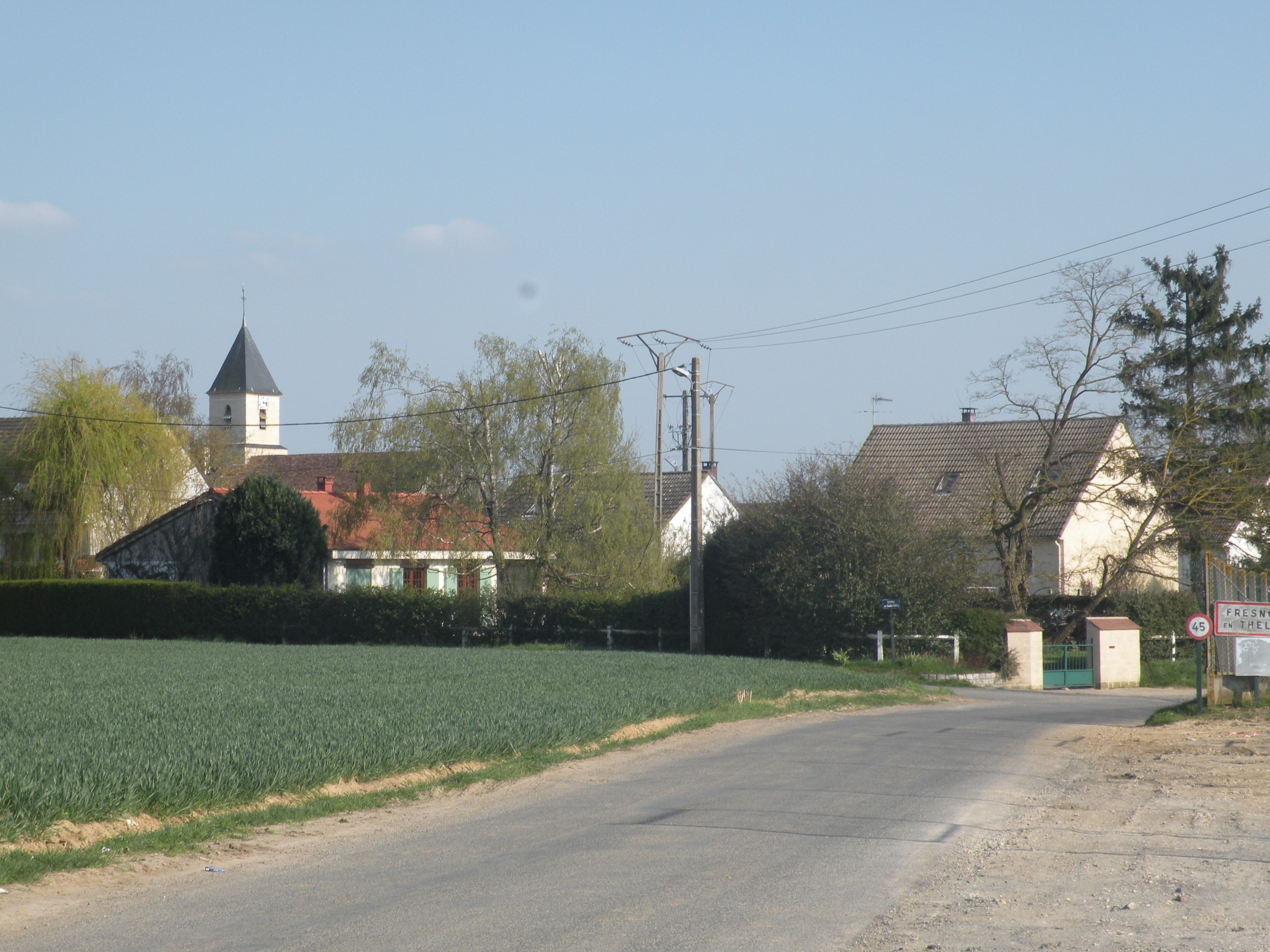
- A general view of Fresnoy-en-Thelle

- Coat of arms
- Location of Fresnoy-en-Thelle
- Location within France Location within Hauts-de-France
- Coordinates: 49°12′05″N 2°16′14″E
- Country: France
- Region: Hauts-de-France
- Department: Oise
- Arrondissement: Senlis
- Canton: Méru
- Intercommunality: CC Thelloise

Government
  - Mayor (2020–2026): Marc Lamoureux
- Area^{1}: 6.28 km^{2} (2.42 sq mi)
- Elevation: 90 m (300 ft)
- Highest elevation: 112 m (367 ft)
- Lowest elevation: 61 m (200 ft)
- Population (2023): 871
  - Density: 139/km^{2} (359/sq mi)
- Time zone: UTC+01:00 (CET)
  - Summer (DST): UTC+02:00 (CEST)
- INSEE/Postal code: 60259 /60530
- ^{1} French Land Register data, which excludes lakes, ponds, glaciers > 1 km^{2} (0.386 sq mi or 247 acres) and river estuaries.

Fresnoy-en-Thelle (French pronunciation: [fʁɛnwa ɑ̃ tɛl]) is a commune in the Oise department in northern France.

== See also ==
- Communes of the Oise department
