= Bornel =

- Commune
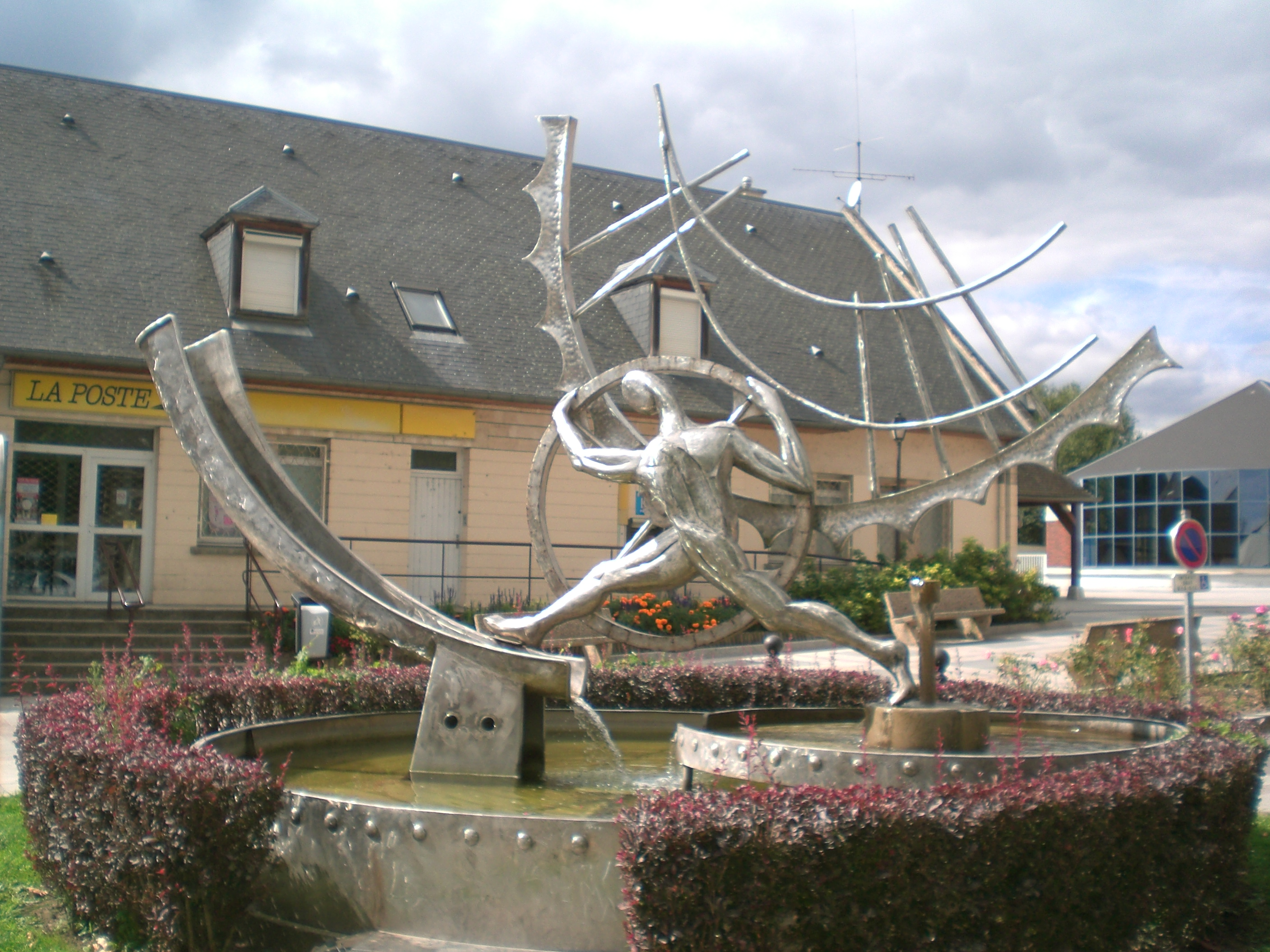
- The fountain in Bornel
- Location of Bornel
- Location within France Location within Hauts-de-France
- Coordinates: 49°11′56″N 2°12′36″E
- Country: France
- Region: Hauts-de-France
- Department: Oise
- Arrondissement: Beauvais
- Canton: Méru
- Intercommunality: Sablons

Government
  - Mayor (2020–2026): Dominique Toscani
- Area^{1}: 23.73 km^{2} (9.16 sq mi)
- Elevation: 48 m (157 ft)
- Highest elevation: 162 m (531 ft)
- Lowest elevation: 43 m (141 ft)
- Population (2023): 4,832
  - Density: 203.6/km^{2} (527.4/sq mi)
- Time zone: UTC+01:00 (CET)
  - Summer (DST): UTC+02:00 (CEST)
- INSEE/Postal code: 60088 /60540
- ^{1} French Land Register data, which excludes lakes, ponds, glaciers > 1 km^{2} (0.386 sq mi or 247 acres) and river estuaries.

Bornel is a commune in the Oise department in northern France. On 1 January 2016, the former communes Anserville and Fosseuse were merged into Bornel. Bornel—Belle-Église station has rail connections to Beauvais and Paris.

== Population ==
The population data in the table below refer to the commune of Bornel proper, in its geography at the given years.

Historical population

| Year | Pop. | ±% p.a. |
|---|---|---|
| 1793 | 550 | — |
| 1821 | 555 | +0.03% |
| 1846 | 563 | +0.06% |
| 1872 | 979 | +2.15% |
| 1901 | 1,115 | +0.45% |
| 1926 | 1,527 | +1.27% |
| 1946 | 1,501 | −0.09% |
| 1962 | 1,910 | +1.52% |

| Year | Pop. | ±% p.a. |
|---|---|---|
| 1968 | 2,122 | +1.77% |
| 1975 | 2,150 | +0.19% |
| 1982 | 2,625 | +2.89% |
| 1990 | 2,988 | +1.63% |
| 1999 | 3,300 | +1.11% |
| 2007 | 3,630 | +1.20% |
| 2012 | 3,562 | −0.38% |
| 2017 | 4,817 | +6.22% |

Source: EHESS and INSEE (2007-2017)

== See also ==
- Communes of the Oise department
