= Andeville =

- Commune
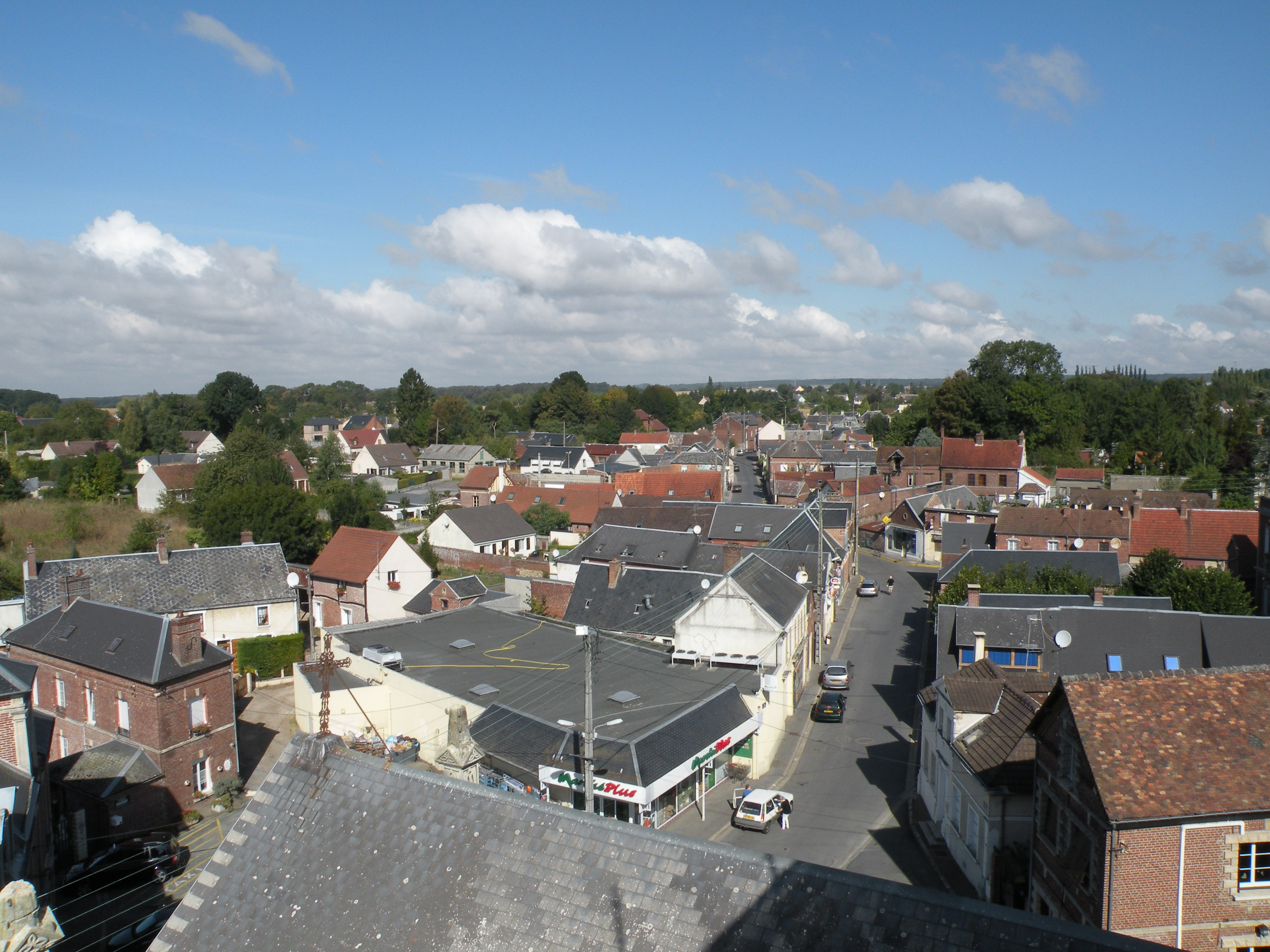
- View from the roof of the village church
- Location of Andeville
- Location within France Location within Hauts-de-France
- Coordinates: 49°15′37″N 2°09′57″E
- Country: France
- Region: Hauts-de-France
- Department: Oise
- Arrondissement: Beauvais
- Canton: Méru
- Intercommunality: Sablons

Government
  - Mayor (2020–2026): Jean-Charles Morel
- Area^{1}: 4.17 km^{2} (1.61 sq mi)
- Elevation: 150 m (490 ft)
- Highest elevation: 178 m (584 ft)
- Lowest elevation: 122 m (400 ft)
- Population (2023): 3,434
  - Density: 824/km^{2} (2,130/sq mi)
- Time zone: UTC+01:00 (CET)
  - Summer (DST): UTC+02:00 (CEST)
- INSEE/Postal code: 60012 /60570
- ^{1} French Land Register data, which excludes lakes, ponds, glaciers > 1 km^{2} (0.386 sq mi or 247 acres) and river estuaries.

Andeville (French pronunciation: [ɑ̃dvil]) is a commune in the Oise department in northern France.

== Population ==
Historical population

| Year | Pop. | ±% p.a. |
|---|---|---|
| 1793 | 675 | — |
| 1821 | 772 | +0.48% |
| 1846 | 1,168 | +1.67% |
| 1872 | 1,253 | +0.27% |
| 1901 | 1,418 | +0.43% |
| 1926 | 1,499 | +0.22% |
| 1946 | 1,220 | −1.02% |
| 1962 | 1,306 | +0.43% |
| 1968 | 1,427 | +1.49% |

| Year | Pop. | ±% p.a. |
|---|---|---|
| 1975 | 1,465 | +0.38% |
| 1982 | 1,782 | +2.84% |
| 1990 | 2,282 | +3.14% |
| 1999 | 2,996 | +3.07% |
| 2007 | 3,131 | +0.55% |
| 2012 | 3,078 | −0.34% |
| 2017 | 3,227 | +0.95% |
| 2023 | 3,434 | +1.04% |

Source: EHESS and INSEE (1968-2023)

== See also ==
- Communes of the Oise department
