= Esches =

- Commune
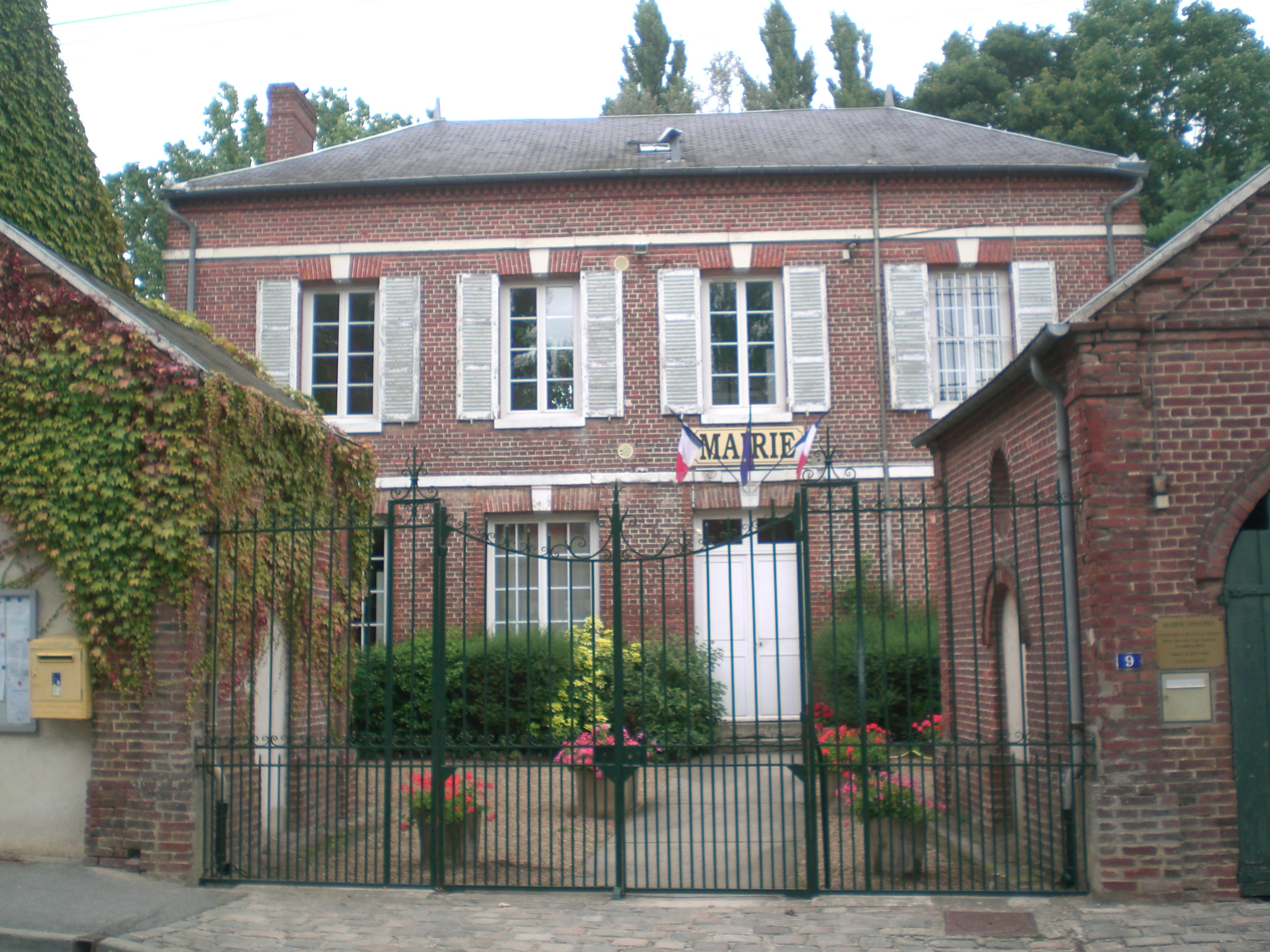
- Town hall
- Location of Esches
- Location within France Location within Hauts-de-France
- Coordinates: 49°13′08″N 2°09′58″E
- Country: France
- Region: Hauts-de-France
- Department: Oise
- Arrondissement: Beauvais
- Canton: Méru
- Intercommunality: Sablons

Government
  - Mayor (2020–2026): Denis Vanhoutte
- Area^{1}: 7.69 km^{2} (2.97 sq mi)
- Elevation: 62 m (203 ft)
- Highest elevation: 142 m (466 ft)
- Lowest elevation: 57 m (187 ft)
- Population (2023): 1,623
  - Density: 211/km^{2} (547/sq mi)
- Time zone: UTC+01:00 (CET)
  - Summer (DST): UTC+02:00 (CEST)
- INSEE/Postal code: 60218 /60110
- ^{1} French Land Register data, which excludes lakes, ponds, glaciers > 1 km^{2} (0.386 sq mi or 247 acres) and river estuaries.

Esches (French pronunciation: [ɛʃ]) is a commune in the Oise department in northern France. Esches station has rail connections to Beauvais and Paris.

== See also ==
- Communes of the Oise department
