= Dieudonné, Oise =

Dieudonné
- Commune
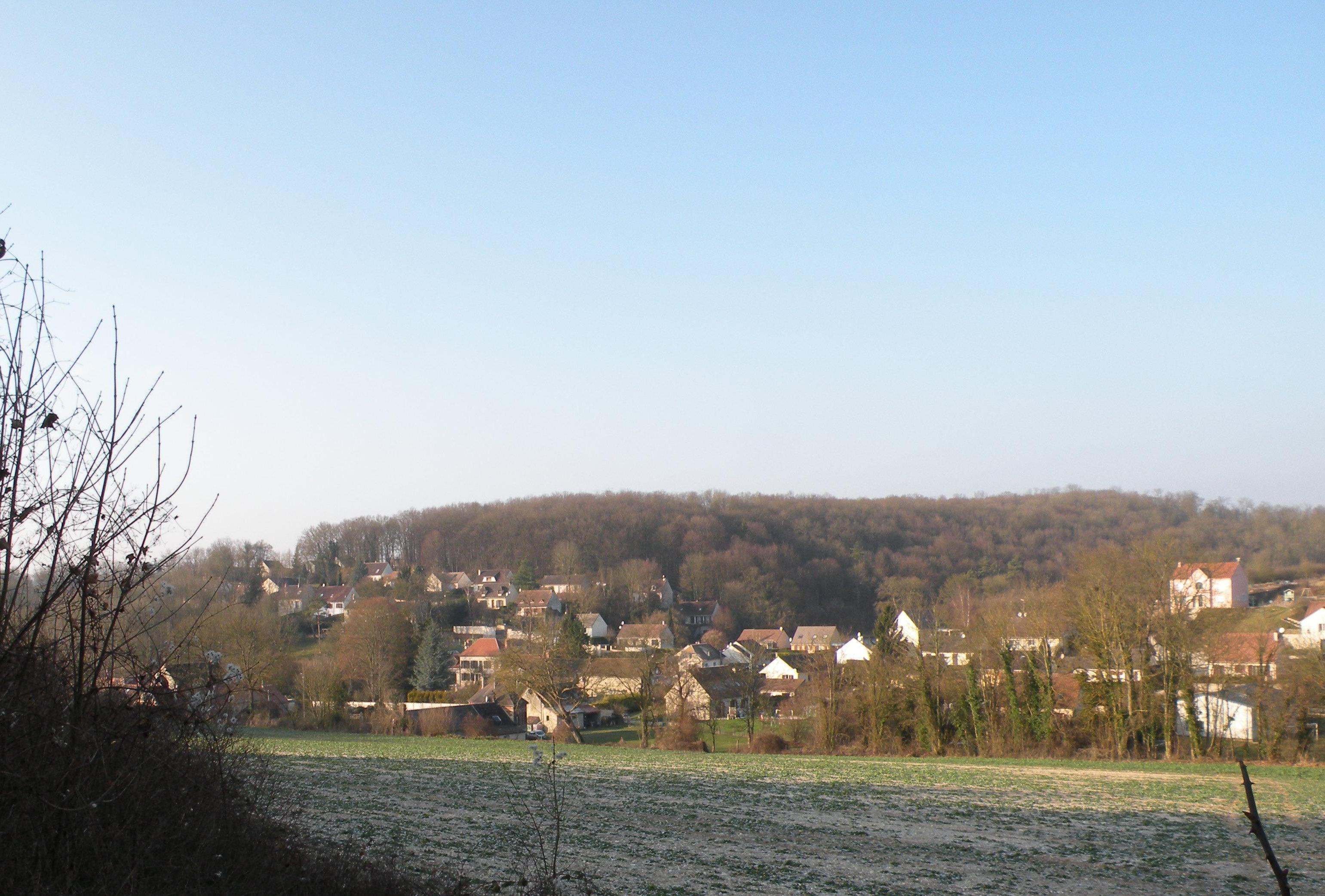
- A general view of Dieudonné
- Location of Dieudonné
- Location within France Location within Hauts-de-France
- Coordinates: 49°13′53″N 2°14′55″E
- Country: France
- Region: Hauts-de-France
- Department: Oise
- Arrondissement: Senlis
- Canton: Méru
- Intercommunality: CC Thelloise

Government
  - Mayor (2023–2026): Jean Pierre Chatron
- Area^{1}: 10.38 km^{2} (4.01 sq mi)
- Elevation: 85 m (279 ft)
- Highest elevation: 170 m (560 ft)
- Lowest elevation: 71 m (233 ft)
- Population (2023): 987
  - Density: 95.1/km^{2} (246/sq mi)
- Time zone: UTC+01:00 (CET)
  - Summer (DST): UTC+02:00 (CEST)
- INSEE/Postal code: 60197 /60530
- ^{1} French Land Register data, which excludes lakes, ponds, glaciers > 1 km^{2} (0.386 sq mi or 247 acres) and river estuaries.

Dieudonné (French pronunciation: [djødɔne]) is a commune in the Oise department in northern France.

== See also ==
- Communes of the Oise department
