= Puiseux-le-Hauberger =

- Commune
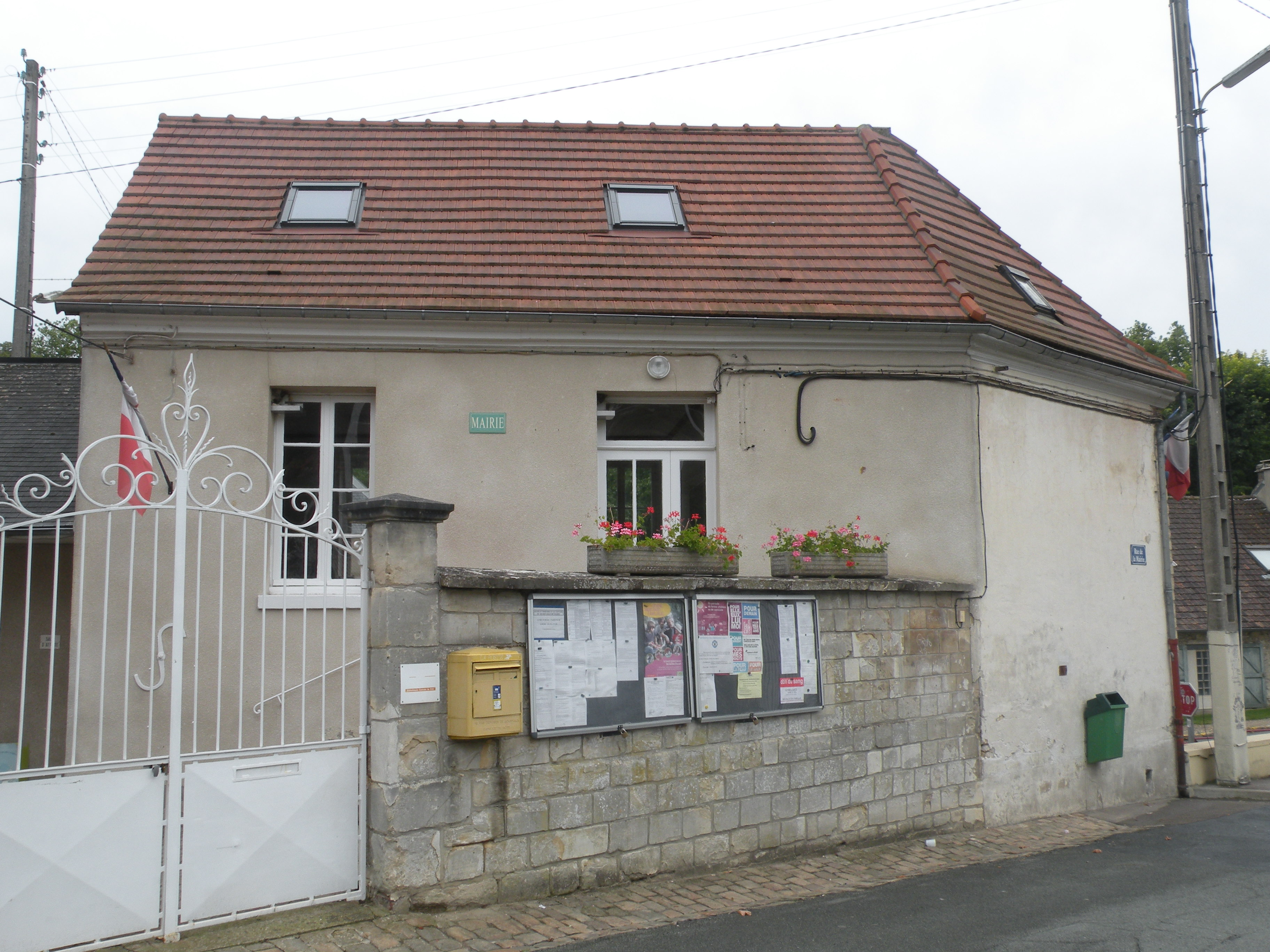
- The town hall in Puiseux-le-Hauberger
- Location of Puiseux-le-Hauberger
- Location within France Location within Hauts-de-France
- Coordinates: 49°12′59″N 2°14′16″E
- Country: France
- Region: Hauts-de-France
- Department: Oise
- Arrondissement: Senlis
- Canton: Méru

Government
  - Mayor (2020–2026): Bruno Caleiro
- Area^{1}: 5.36 km^{2} (2.07 sq mi)
- Elevation: 130 m (430 ft)
- Highest elevation: 134 m (440 ft)
- Lowest elevation: 56 m (184 ft)
- Population (2023): 877
  - Density: 164/km^{2} (424/sq mi)
- Time zone: UTC+01:00 (CET)
  - Summer (DST): UTC+02:00 (CEST)
- INSEE/Postal code: 60517 /60540
- ^{1} French Land Register data, which excludes lakes, ponds, glaciers > 1 km^{2} (0.386 sq mi or 247 acres) and river estuaries.

Puiseux-le-Hauberger (French pronunciation: [pɥizø lə obɛʁʒe]) is a commune in the Oise department in northern France.

== See also ==
- Communes of the Oise department
