= Ercuis =

- Commune
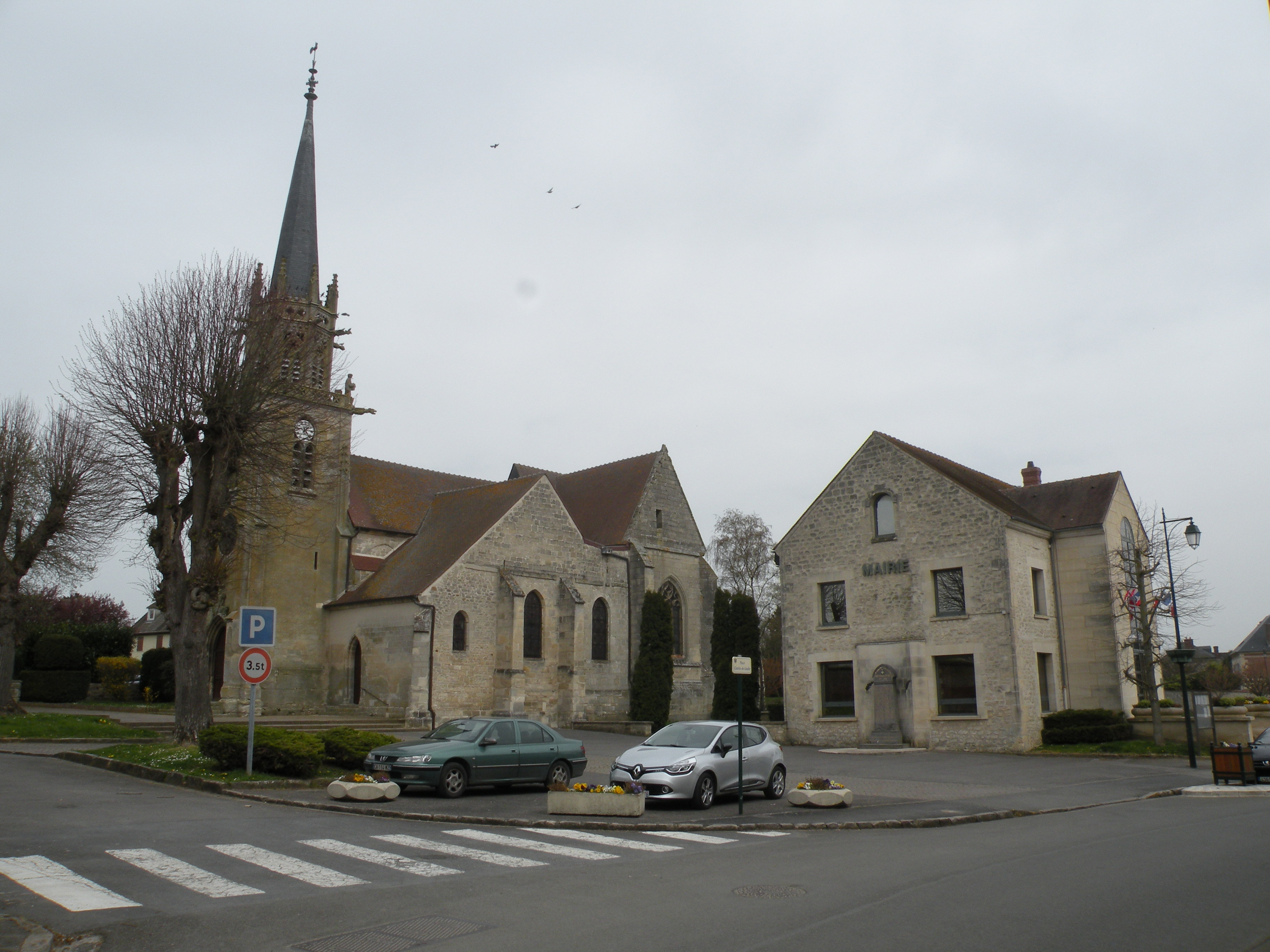
- The church and town hall in Ercuis
- Location of Ercuis
- Location within France Location within Hauts-de-France
- Coordinates: 49°14′11″N 2°18′30″E
- Country: France
- Region: Hauts-de-France
- Department: Oise
- Arrondissement: Senlis
- Canton: Méru

Government
  - Mayor (2020–2026): Jean-Marie Nigay
- Area^{1}: 4.38 km^{2} (1.69 sq mi)
- Elevation: 151 m (495 ft)
- Highest elevation: 157 m (515 ft)
- Lowest elevation: 84 m (276 ft)
- Population (2023): 1,603
  - Density: 366/km^{2} (948/sq mi)
- Time zone: UTC+01:00 (CET)
  - Summer (DST): UTC+02:00 (CEST)
- INSEE/Postal code: 60212 /60530
- ^{1} French Land Register data, which excludes lakes, ponds, glaciers > 1 km^{2} (0.386 sq mi or 247 acres) and river estuaries.

Ercuis (French pronunciation: [ɛʁkɥi]) is a commune in the Oise department in northern France.

== See also ==
- Communes of the Oise department
