= Neuilly-en-Thelle =

- Commune
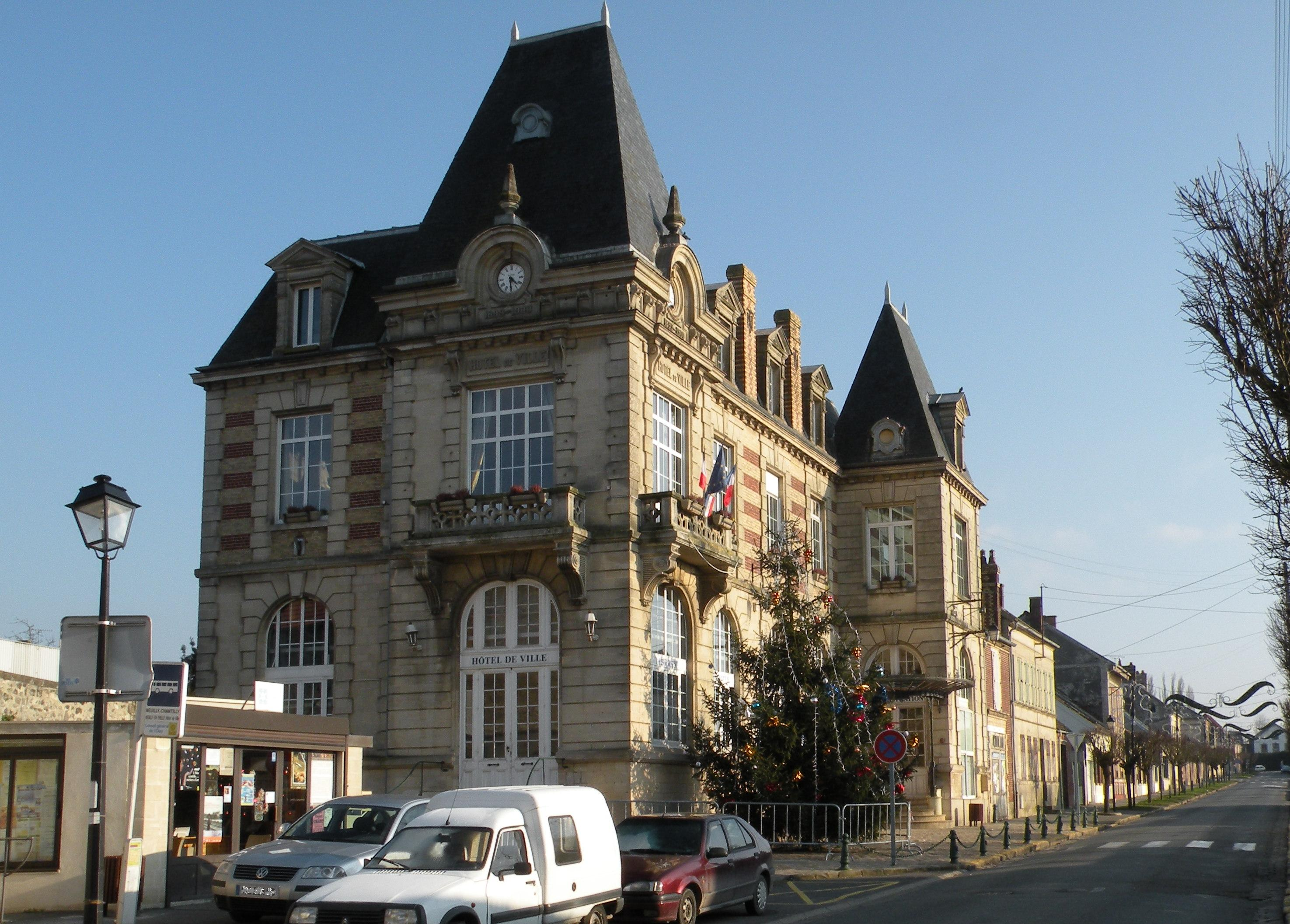
- The town hall in Neuilly-en-Thelle

- Coat of arms
- Location of Neuilly-en-Thelle
- Location within France Location within Hauts-de-France
- Coordinates: 49°13′28″N 2°17′10″E
- Country: France
- Region: Hauts-de-France
- Department: Oise
- Arrondissement: Senlis
- Canton: Méru

Government
  - Mayor (2020–2026): Bernard Onclercq
- Area^{1}: 15.73 km^{2} (6.07 sq mi)
- Elevation: 130 m (430 ft)
- Highest elevation: 170 m (560 ft)
- Lowest elevation: 89 m (292 ft)
- Population (2023): 4,127
  - Density: 262.4/km^{2} (679.5/sq mi)
- Time zone: UTC+01:00 (CET)
  - Summer (DST): UTC+02:00 (CEST)
- INSEE/Postal code: 60450 /60530
- ^{1} French Land Register data, which excludes lakes, ponds, glaciers > 1 km^{2} (0.386 sq mi or 247 acres) and river estuaries.

Neuilly-en-Thelle (French pronunciation: [nøji ɑ̃ tɛl]) is a commune in the Oise department in northern France.

== Population ==
Historical population
| Year | Pop. | ±% p.a. |
|---|---|---|
| 1968 | 1,942 | — |
| 1975 | 1,898 | −0.33% |
| 1982 | 2,397 | +3.39% |
| 1990 | 2,683 | +1.42% |
| 1999 | 3,064 | +1.49% |
| 2007 | 3,096 | +0.13% |
| 2012 | 3,107 | +0.07% |
| 2017 | 3,655 | +3.30% |
| 2023 | 4,127 | +2.04% |
Source: INSEE

== See also ==
- Communes of the Oise department
