= Méru station =

Railway station in Méru, France

Méru
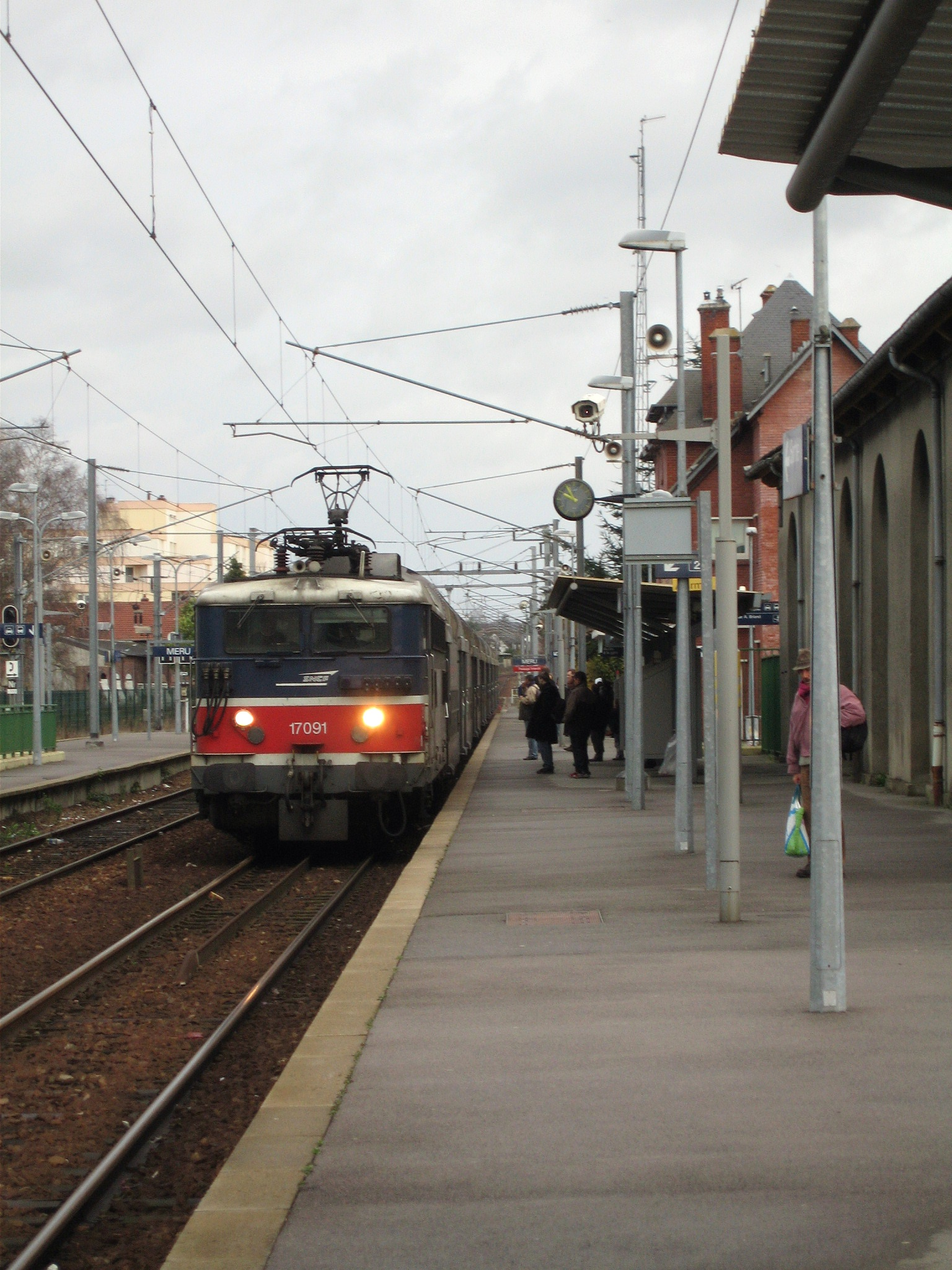
- The station in December 2006

General information
- Location: Méru, France
- Coordinates: 49°13′55″N 2°7′58″E
- Owner: SNCF
- Line: Épinay-Villetaneuse–Le Tréport-Mers railway
- Tracks: 3

Other information
- Station code: 87313668

Services
| Preceding station | TER Hauts-de-France | Following station |
|---|---|---|
| Esches towards Paris-Nord | Citi C17 | Laboissière–Le Déluge towards Beauvais |
Location

Méru is a railway station located in Méru (Oise department), France. It is served by TER Hauts-de-France trains from Paris Nord to Beauvais. The Persan–Méru line opened on 1 July 1875. The line did not reach Beauvais in the north until 15 April 1876, and did not reach Paris in the south until 5 April 1877.

There was at one time a connection to Labosse via a metre gauge branch line.

When the line was electrified with 25 kV 50 Hz alternating current, a third platform track was added to create a partial terminus.

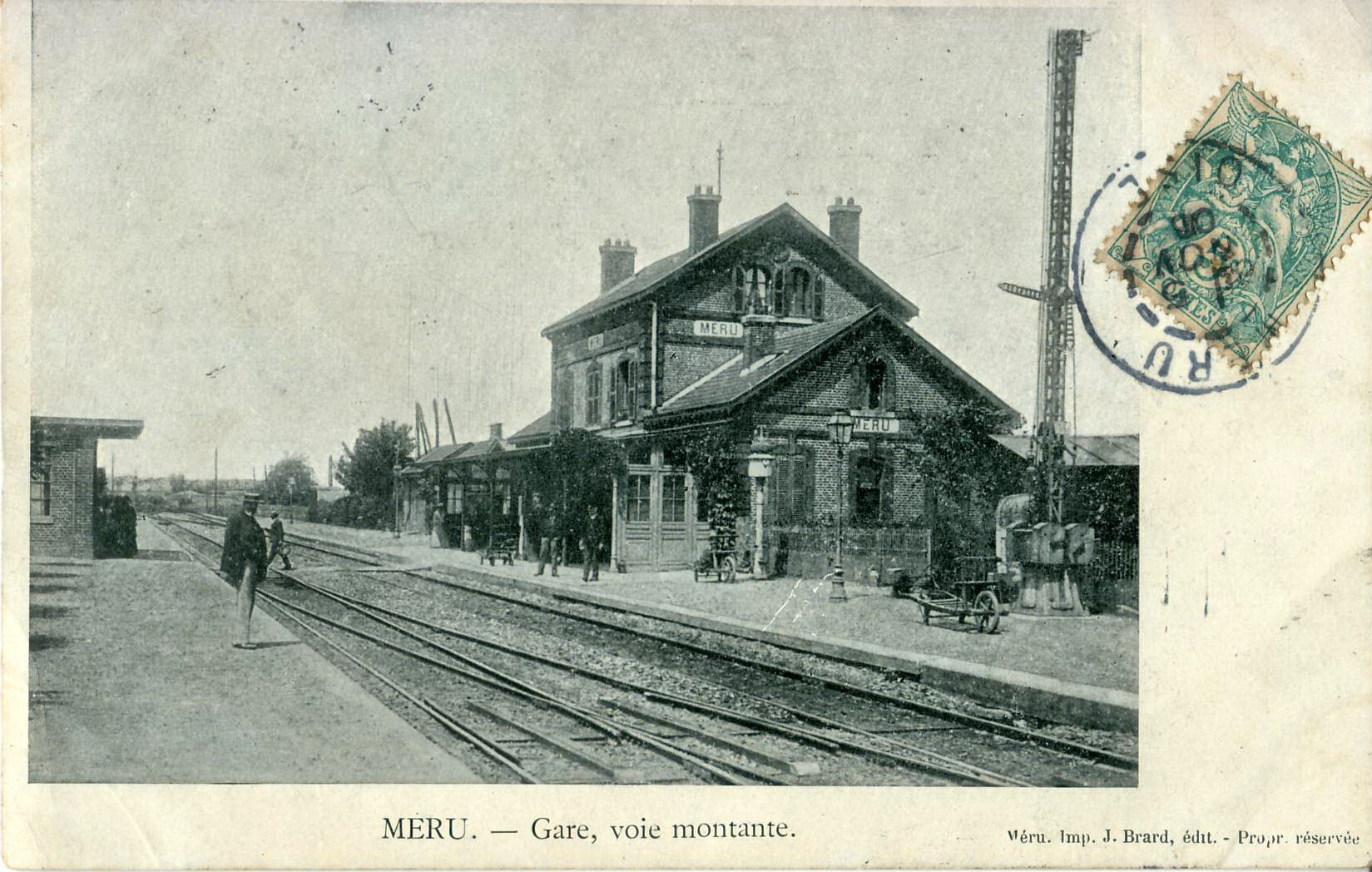
The station in the early 20th century

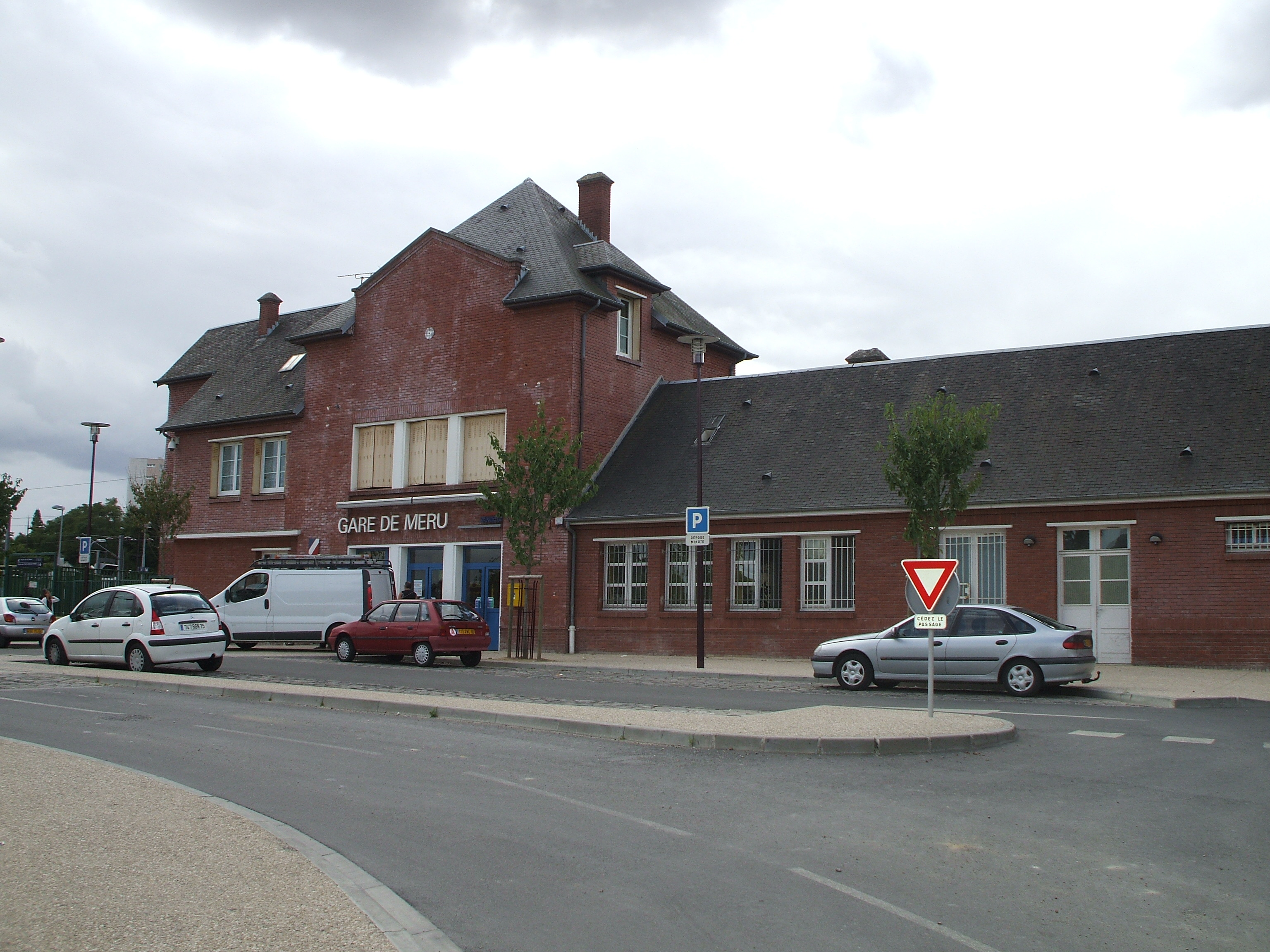
The front of the station

== See also ==
- List of SNCF stations in Hauts-de-France
