= Lormaison =

- Commune
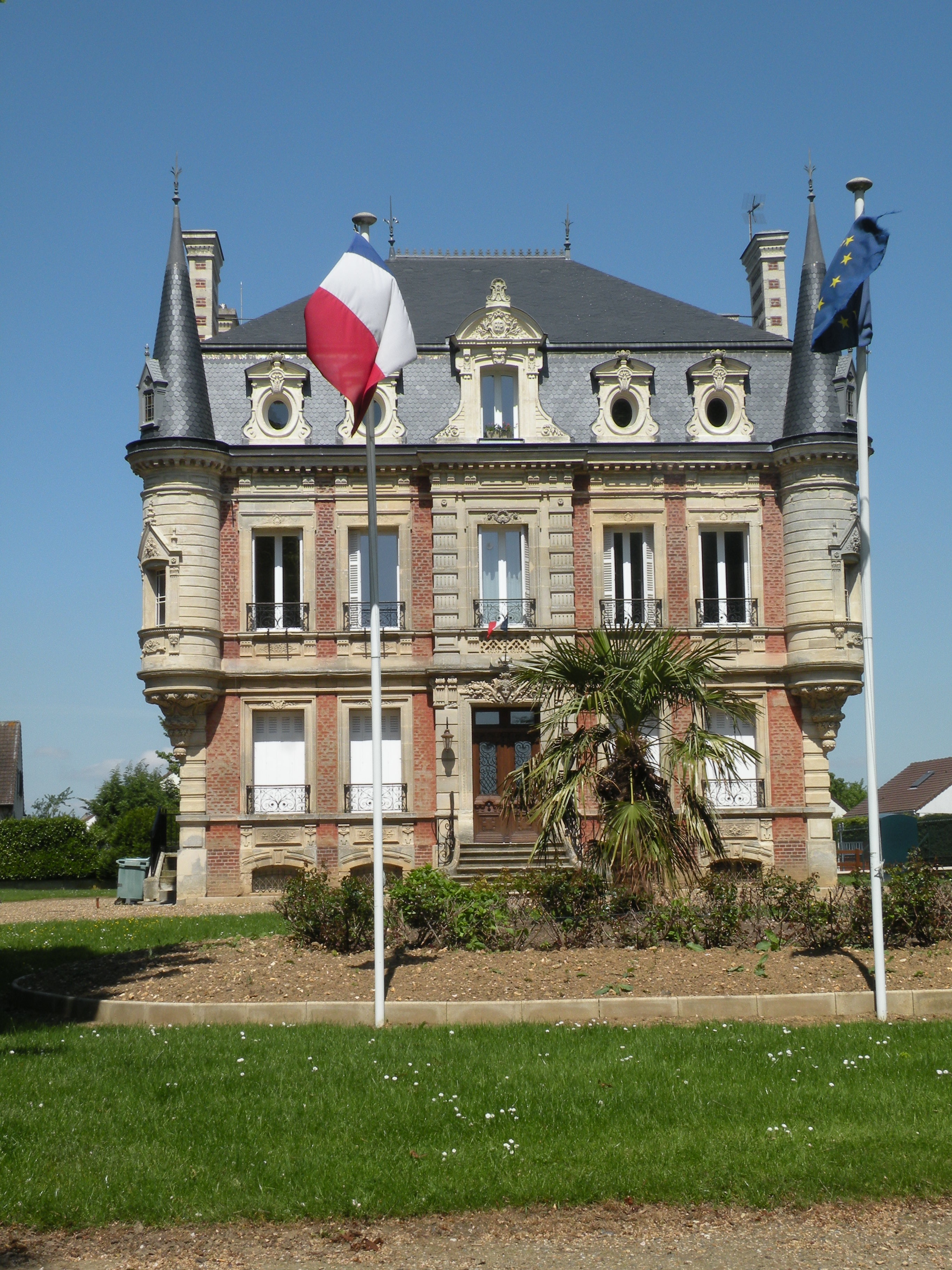
- The town hall in Lormaison
- Location of Lormaison
- Location within France Location within Hauts-de-France
- Coordinates: 49°15′27″N 2°06′23″E
- Country: France
- Region: Hauts-de-France
- Department: Oise
- Arrondissement: Beauvais
- Canton: Méru
- Intercommunality: Sablons

Government
  - Mayor (2020–2026): Philippe Fremont
- Area^{1}: 11.18 km^{2} (4.32 sq mi)
- Elevation: 130 m (430 ft)
- Highest elevation: 186 m (610 ft)
- Lowest elevation: 102 m (335 ft)
- Population (2023): 1,247
  - Density: 111.5/km^{2} (288.9/sq mi)
- Time zone: UTC+01:00 (CET)
  - Summer (DST): UTC+02:00 (CEST)
- INSEE/Postal code: 60370 /60110
- ^{1} French Land Register data, which excludes lakes, ponds, glaciers > 1 km^{2} (0.386 sq mi or 247 acres) and river estuaries.

Lormaison (French pronunciation: [lɔʁmɛzɔ̃]) is a commune in the Oise department in northern France.

== See also ==
- Communes of the Oise department
