= Chambly station =

French railway station

Chambly
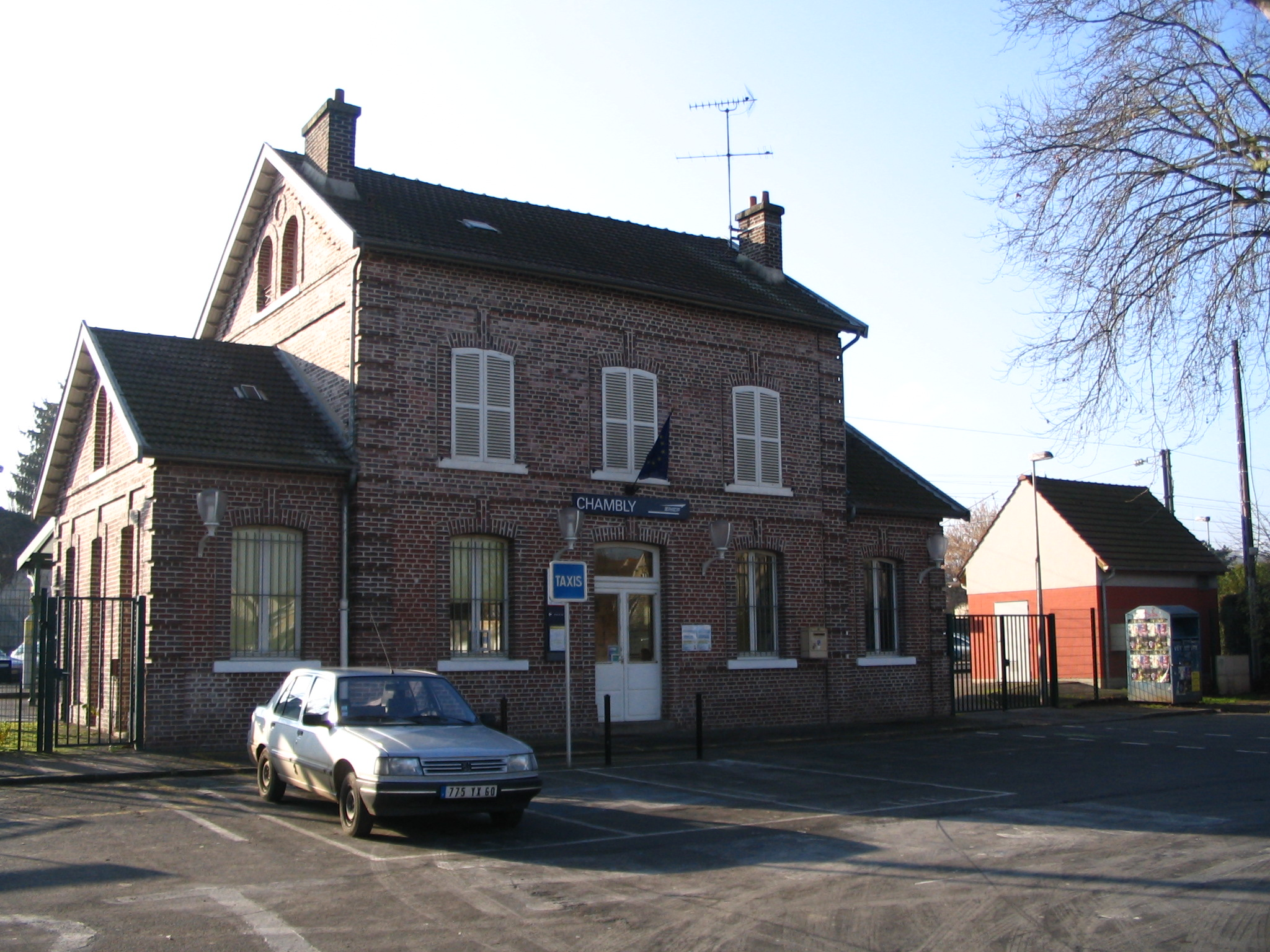
- Station building in 2008

General information
- Location: Place de la Gare, 60230 Chambly, France
- Coordinates: 49°09′49″N 2°14′26″E
- Owner: SNCF
- Line: Épinay-Villetaneuse–Le Tréport-Mers railway
- Platforms: 2
- Tracks: 2

Other information
- Station code: 87276725
- Website: Gare de Chambly

Services
Preceding station	TER Hauts-de-France	Following station
Persan–Beaumont towards Paris-Nord	Citi C17	Bornel–Belle-Église towards Beauvais
Location

Chambly station (French: Gare de Chambly) is a railway station located 500 metres from the centre of the commune of Chambly (Oise department), France. It is on the Épinay-Villetaneuse–Le Tréport-Mers railway and is served by TER Hauts-de-France trains from Paris to Beauvais.

The SNCF's Moulin Neuf Industrial Equipment Facility (formerly the Moulin Neuf Works) is also at Chambly.

== Passenger station ==
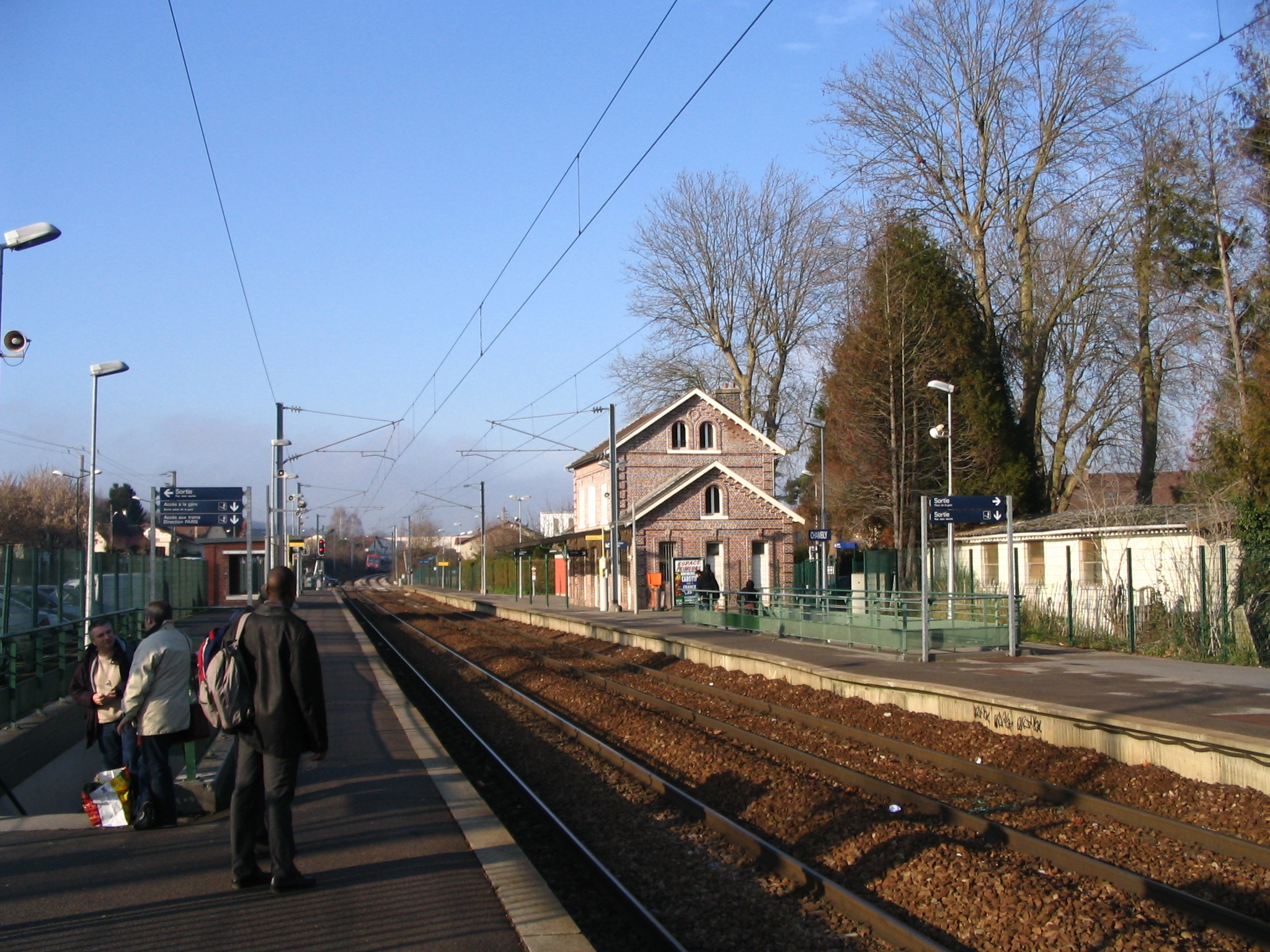
Gare de Chambly from the platform side

The passenger station is located at kilometre mark 40.880 on the line from Épinay-Villetaneuse to Le Tréport-Mers, between Persan-Beaumont and Bornel—Belle-Église. The Moulin Neuf facility is at kilometre mark 39.445.

The station has a passenger building with a ticket office which is open daily, plus automatic ticket dispensers. There is a carpark nearby. Access to the platforms, which are equipped with shelters, is via an underground passage.

The station is served by approximately 20 TER Hauts-de-France trains a day in each direction on weekdays and approximately ten in each direction on weekends and public holidays.

== Moulin Neuf Industrial Equipment Facility ==
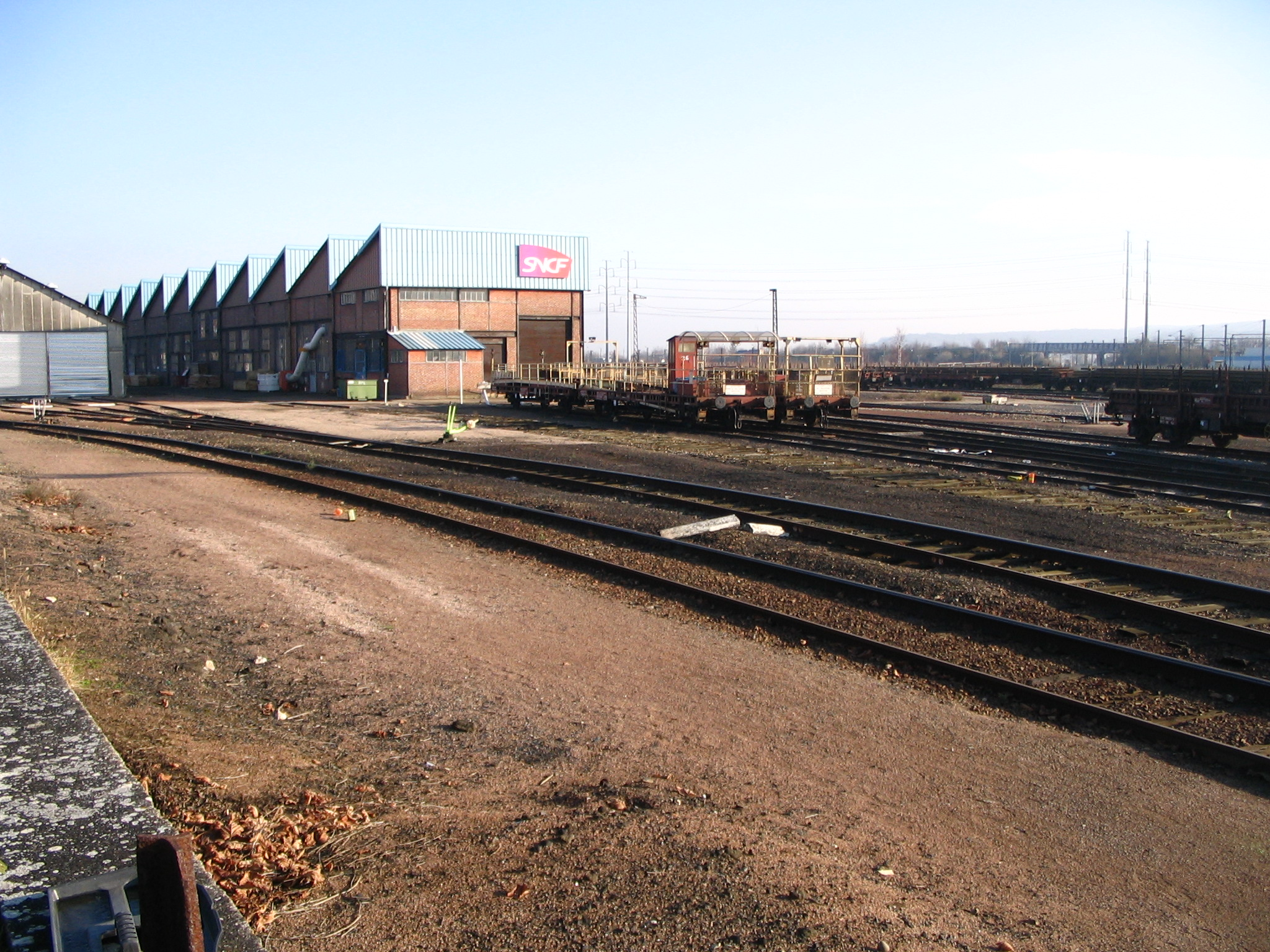
SNCF Chambly-Moulin Neuf Industrial Equipment Facility as it is today

During the First World War, the French military decided to establish a facility at Chambly for repairing strategic infrastructure behind the front lines. This is the origin of the Moulin Neuf works, which opened in 1916 and in 1917 was augmented with a site for the construction of track equipment (such as points) for equipping new strategic lines and repairing existing behind the lines track. Installations were overseen by the 5th Engineer Regiment, the only unit of the French Army which specialised in railway works.

At the end of the war, the military relinquished the facilities and the Nord company took possession of them again in order to rebuild their track and installations, which had suffered considerably from the years of conflict.

In 1920, wood processing facilities which had been established before the war at Villers-Cotterêts were moved to Moulin Neuf. Since the railway had significant needs for treated wood, notably for making sleepers, a sawmill, a joinery and a carpentry shop were set up at Moulin Neuf, as well as facilities for impregnating and creosoting wood and chairing sleepers.

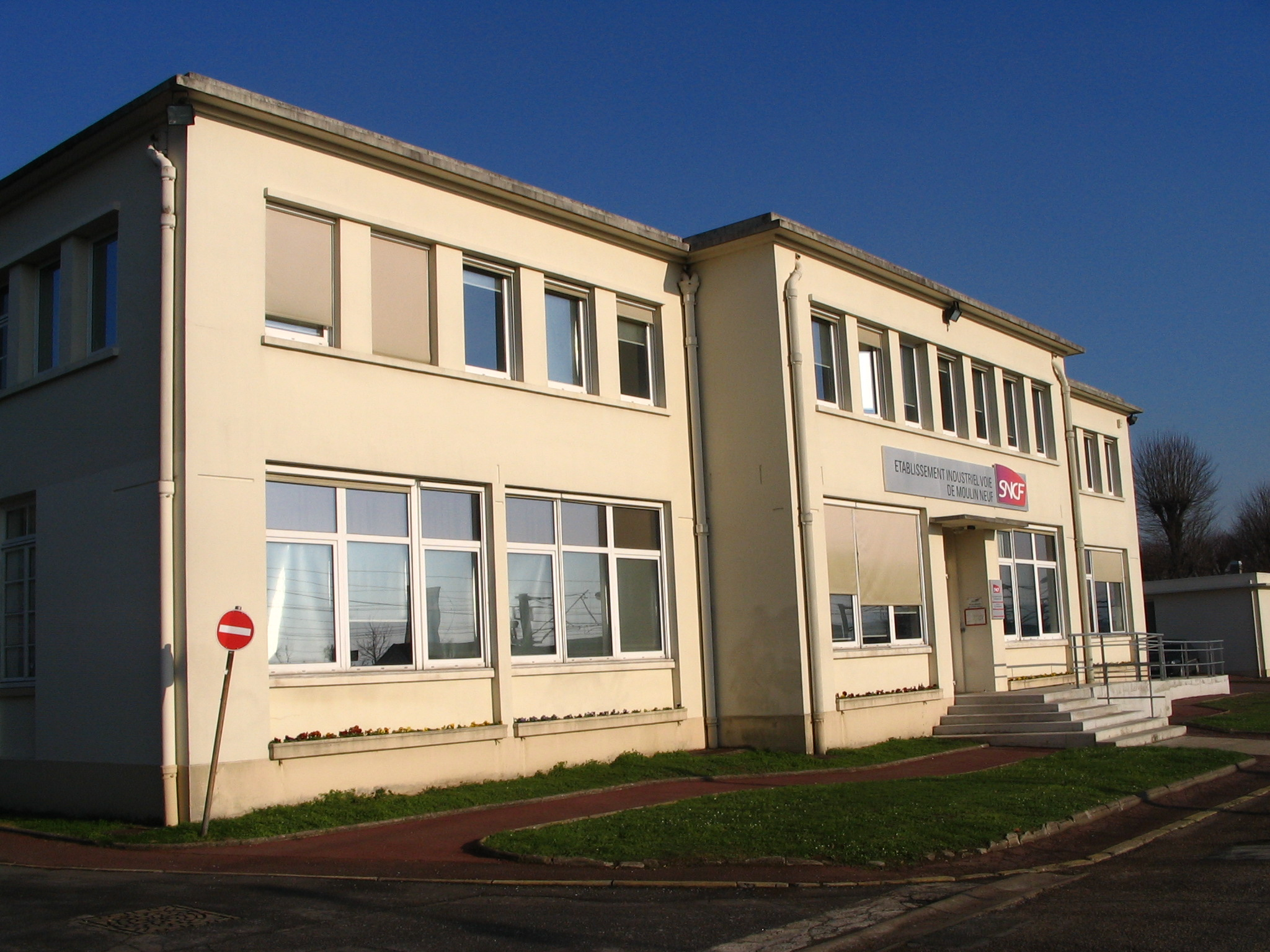
Main building

The facilities continued to be enlarged with the creation of an electric power station, forge and machine shops, and in 1933 the works had 850 employees and included an apprentice school. Moulin Neuf provided the Nord rail network with everything necessary for construction and upkeep in terms of wood, tooling, and track.

From 1931 on, Moulin Neuf took over the functions of the former works at Ermont and was enlarged onto another 10 hectares, with a gantry and a workshop for machining rails. At the beginning of the Second World War, more than 1,000 people worked on site; in the early 1960s, 1,150.

The Nord company built 160 units of housing for their workers in a company town at Chambly between 1920 and 1930; after 1930 this grew by roughly 100 houses.

The site was bombed on several occasions, particularly in 1944. On 2 May 1944 the Royal Air Force dropped more than 1,200 explosive incendiary bombs, causing significant damage to the works.

In the early 1950s, the facilities for repair and manufacturing of rail track material was one of the largest in Europe. It covered more than 90 hectares, a portion of which was within the commune of Le Mesnil-en-Thelle. The site is crisscrossed by 50 km of track. Since 1966, it has been called the Moulin Neuf Industrial Equipment Facility.

As of 2010, it still employs 500 workers.

== See also ==
- List of SNCF stations in Hauts-de-France

== Sources ==
- "Moulin-Neuf, domaine du rail et de la traverse", Notre métier: l'hebdomadaire de la vie du rail 281 (8 January 1951) (in French)
