= Belle-Église =

- Commune
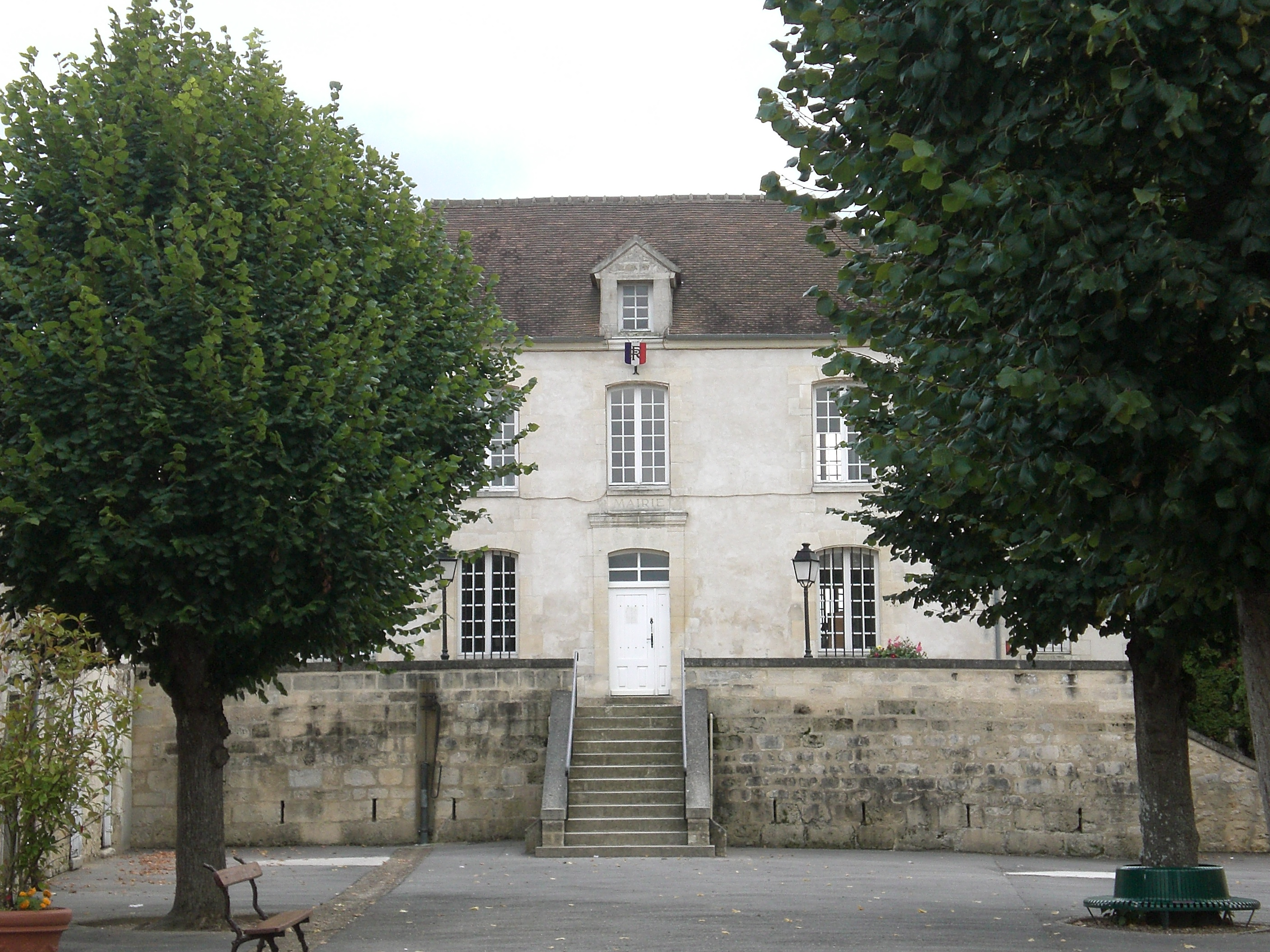
- The town hall in Belle-Église
- Location of Belle-Église
- Location within France Location within Hauts-de-France
- Coordinates: 49°11′35″N 2°13′11″E
- Country: France
- Region: Hauts-de-France
- Department: Oise
- Arrondissement: Senlis
- Canton: Méru

Government
  - Mayor (2020–2026): Dominique Margery
- Area^{1}: 7.83 km^{2} (3.02 sq mi)
- Elevation: 49 m (161 ft)
- Highest elevation: 167 m (548 ft)
- Lowest elevation: 37 m (121 ft)
- Population (2023): 730
  - Density: 93/km^{2} (240/sq mi)
- Time zone: UTC+01:00 (CET)
  - Summer (DST): UTC+02:00 (CEST)
- INSEE/Postal code: 60060 /60540
- ^{1} French Land Register data, which excludes lakes, ponds, glaciers > 1 km^{2} (0.386 sq mi or 247 acres) and river estuaries.

Belle-Église (French pronunciation: [bɛl eɡliz]) is a commune in the Oise department in northern France.

== Population ==
Historical population
Year	Pop.	±% p.a.
1968	406	—
1975	430	+0.82%
1982	449	+0.62%
1990	503	+1.43%
1999	561	+1.22%
2007	571	+0.22%
2012	611	+1.36%
2017	609	−0.07%
2023	730	+3.07%
Source: INSEE

== See also ==
- Communes of the Oise department
