= Méru =

- Commune
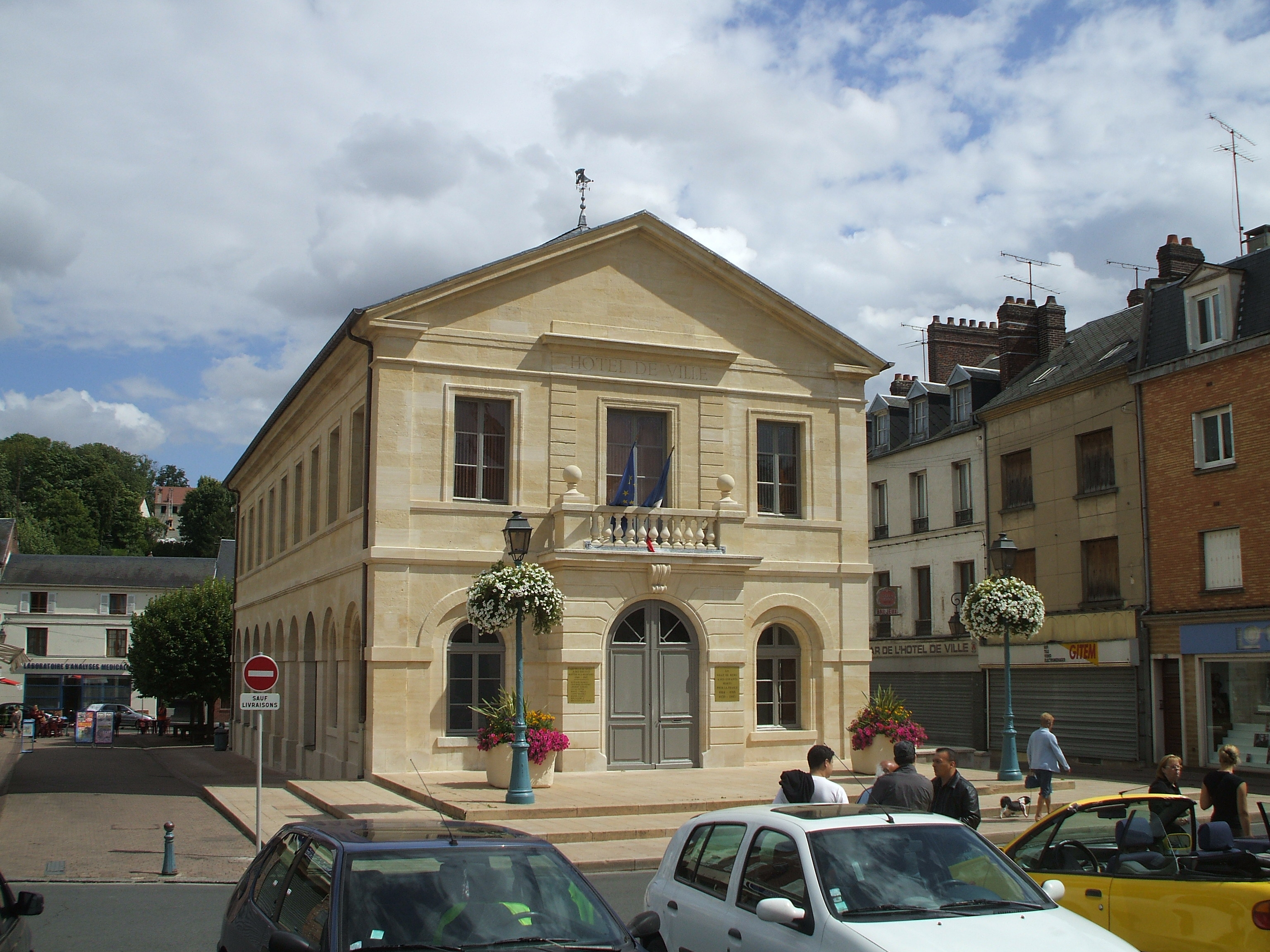
- City hall

- Coat of arms
- Location of Méru
- Location within France Location within Hauts-de-France
- Coordinates: 49°14′08″N 2°08′02″E
- Country: France
- Region: Hauts-de-France
- Department: Oise
- Arrondissement: Beauvais
- Canton: Méru

Government
  - Mayor (2020–2026): Nathalie Ravier
- Area^{1}: 22.83 km^{2} (8.81 sq mi)
- Elevation: 102 m (335 ft)
- Highest elevation: 184 m (604 ft)
- Lowest elevation: 72 m (236 ft)
- Population (2023): 13,897
  - Density: 608.7/km^{2} (1,577/sq mi)
- Time zone: UTC+01:00 (CET)
  - Summer (DST): UTC+02:00 (CEST)
- INSEE/Postal code: 60395 /60110
- ^{1} French Land Register data, which excludes lakes, ponds, glaciers > 1 km^{2} (0.386 sq mi or 247 acres) and river estuaries.

Méru (French pronunciation: [meʁy]; Latin: Matrius, Meruacum) is a commune in the Oise department in northern France. Méru station has rail connections to Beauvais and Paris.

== Population ==
Historical population
Year	Pop.	±% p.a.
1968	6,497	—
1975	8,649	+4.17%
1982	11,436	+4.07%
1990	11,928	+0.53%
1999	12,712	+0.71%
2007	12,813	+0.10%
2012	13,948	+1.71%
2017	14,614	+0.94%
2023	13,897	−0.83%
Source: INSEE

== See also ==
- Communes of the Oise department
