= Amblainville =

- Commune
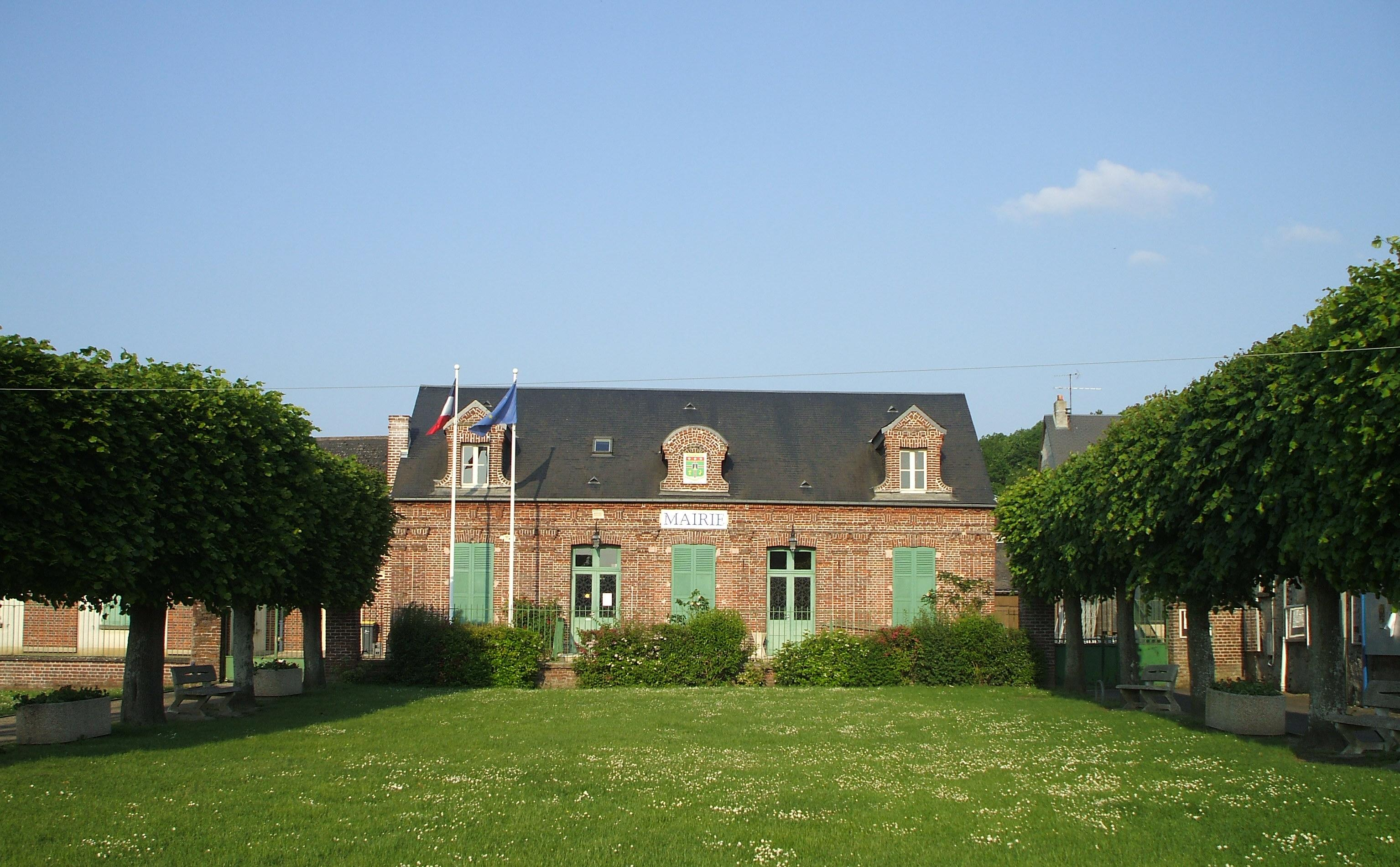
- Town hall
- Location of Amblainville
- Location within France Location within Hauts-de-France
- Coordinates: 49°12′13″N 2°07′21″E
- Country: France
- Region: Hauts-de-France
- Department: Oise
- Arrondissement: Beauvais
- Canton: Méru
- Intercommunality: Les Sablons

Government
  - Mayor (2020–2026): Joël Vasquez
- Area^{1}: 20.98 km^{2} (8.10 sq mi)
- Elevation: 77 m (253 ft)
- Highest elevation: 145 m (476 ft)
- Lowest elevation: 65 m (213 ft)
- Population (2023): 1,805
  - Density: 86.03/km^{2} (222.8/sq mi)
- Time zone: UTC+01:00 (CET)
  - Summer (DST): UTC+02:00 (CEST)
- INSEE/Postal code: 60010 /60110
- ^{1} French Land Register data, which excludes lakes, ponds, glaciers > 1 km^{2} (0.386 sq mi or 247 acres) and river estuaries.

Amblainville (French pronunciation: [ɑ̃blɛ̃vil]) is a commune in the Oise department in northern France.

== Population ==
Historical population
Year	Pop.	±% p.a.
1968	891	—
1975	951	+0.94%
1982	1,408	+5.77%
1990	1,650	+2.00%
1999	1,688	+0.25%
2007	1,718	+0.22%
2012	1,733	+0.17%
2017	1,740	+0.08%
2023	1,805	+0.61%
Source: INSEE

== See also ==
- Communes of the Oise department
