= Canton of Méru =

Canton of France

Coordinates: 49.23°N 2.13°E

- Canton
- Situation of the canton of Méru in the department of Oise
- Country: France
- Region: Hauts-de-France
- Department: Oise
- No. of communes: {{{nbcomm}}}
- Population (2023): 47,188
- INSEE code: 6012

The canton of Méru is an administrative division of the Oise department, northern France. Its borders were modified at the French canton reorganisation which came into effect in March 2015. Its seat is in Méru.

It consists of the following communes:

1. Amblainville
2. Andeville
3. Belle-Église
4. Bornel
5. Chambly
6. Dieudonné
7. Ercuis
8. Esches
9. Fresnoy-en-Thelle
10. Lormaison
11. Méru
12. Neuilly-en-Thelle
13. Puiseux-le-Hauberger
14. Villeneuve-les-Sablons
