= Étaples–Paris-Plage railway =

Railway in France

Coordinates: 50°30′50″N 1°37′20″E

Étaples–Paris-Plage line
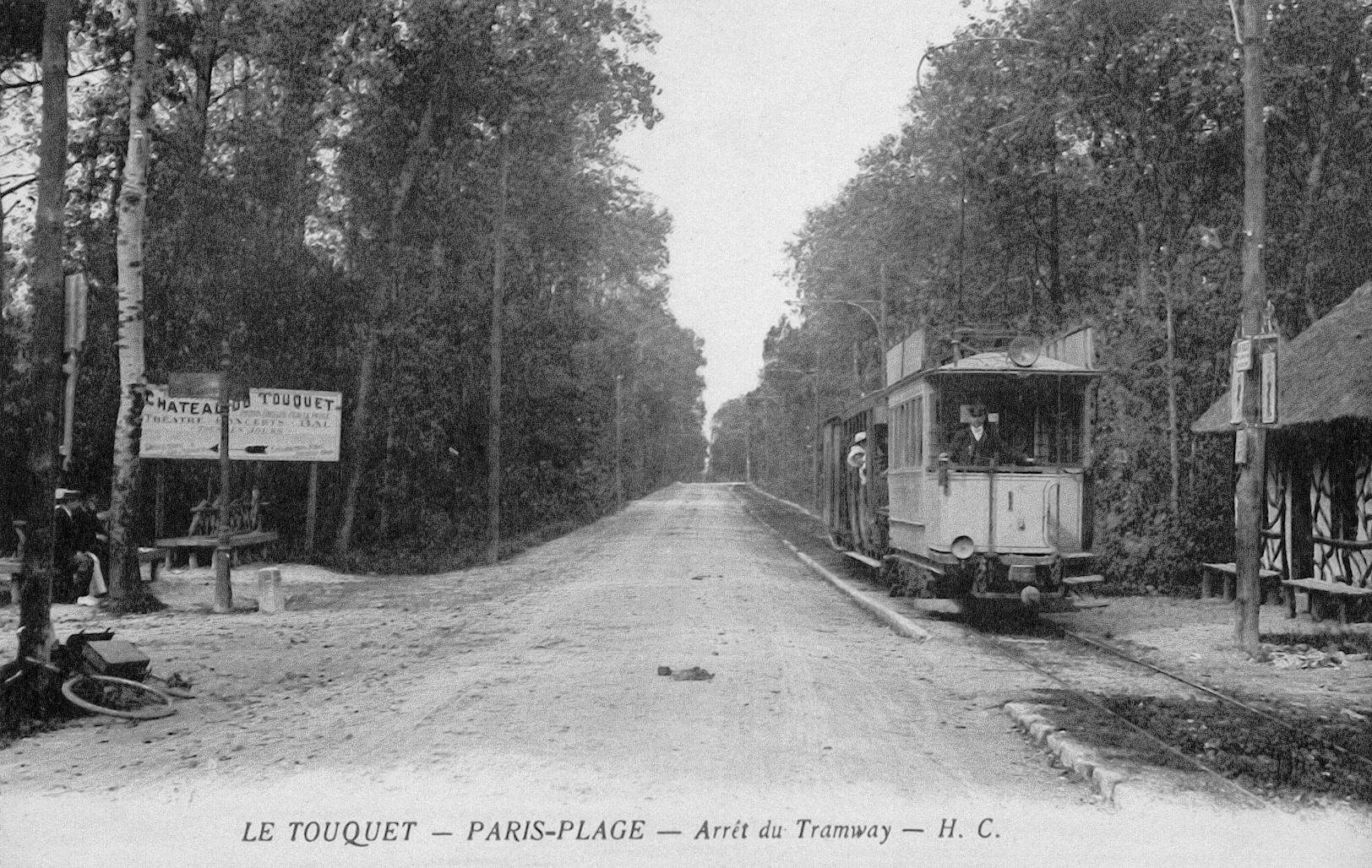
- A tram at the Château train stop in Le Touquet

Overview
- Native name: Tramway d'Étaples à Paris-Plage
- Owner: Société du Tramway d'Étaples à Paris-Plage
- Termini: Étaples–Le Touquet station; Paris-Plage (today Le Touquet-Paris-Plage)
- Connecting lines: Berck-Plage - Paris-Plage line Longueau–Boulogne railway Trams of Le Touquet
- Stations: 8

Service
- Type: Regional rail
- Operator: Same as owner

History
- Opened: 15 July 1900
- Closed: 1940 (Battle of France)

Technical
- Line length: 6.4 kilometres (4.0 mi)
- Number of tracks: Single
- Character: Local passenger rail traffic at-grade street running
- Track gauge: 1,000 mm (3 ft 3 3/8 in)
- Minimum radius: 20 m (66 ft)
- Electrification: 600 V DC
- Maximum incline: 36‰

The rail line between Étaples and Paris-Plage (EP) was a local metre gauge railway line that operated in the Pas-de-Calais department from 1900 to 1940. It connected the seaside resort of Le Touquet (known at the time of the line's opening as Paris-Plage) to the Étaples station.

This electified route carried heavy passenger traffic, reaching up to 32 trains per day during the interwar period. The six-kilometre railway was seriously damaged during the German invasion of France in 1940 and has never been since restored.

== Construction ==
In 1884, Mr. Leborgne, an entrepreneur from Boulogne-sur-Mer, launched a horse-drawn omnibus service between Étaples, a town lying on the main rail line from Amiens and Paris to Calais, and the nascent seaside resort of Paris-Plage (today commonly known as Le Touquet) as a special concession from the Compagnie des Chemins de Fer du Nord.

The rapid growth of Paris-Plage resort attracted many entrepreneurs keen to upgrade the omnibus connection to a railway. In 1892, Mr. Charles Prévost applied for the first concession for a tramway (Note: In late 19th century usage, the word "tramway" in France could mean trams in a modern sense (urban rail transit on public streets) but it was also used for at-grade railway lines of local importance. The word "tramway" here refers to the latter meaning.) from Paris-Plage to the Étaples railway station. This project encountered numerous difficulties that delayed its completion. The Canche estuary bridge at Étaples was too narrow to accommodate both rail and road traffic; another problem lied with the acquisition of the land necessary for the infrastructure. Prévost also hesitated over the mode of traction to be adopted - he initially considered horses but switched his opinion to trains powered by electricity, which would ensure faster and more consistent traffic as well as project a "modern" image for the resort (at the time, electrified rail was a novelty). Despite the declaration of public utility obtained on January 12, 1895, which would facilitate the investment, the matter was not pursued.

By 1898, the government gave the necessary permits to operate electric trains on the line. A new consortium under the leadership of Banque Adam, a local financial institution, quickly overcame the problems mentioned above, in part because the bridge over the Canche was repaired in the meantime. The Société du Tramway d'Étaples à Paris-Plage (EP), as the company was known, inaugurated the metre-gauge electrified train line on 15 July 1900. The provisional authorisation was changed to a standard authorisation to run the line in spring 1902.

== Operation ==
=== Route ===
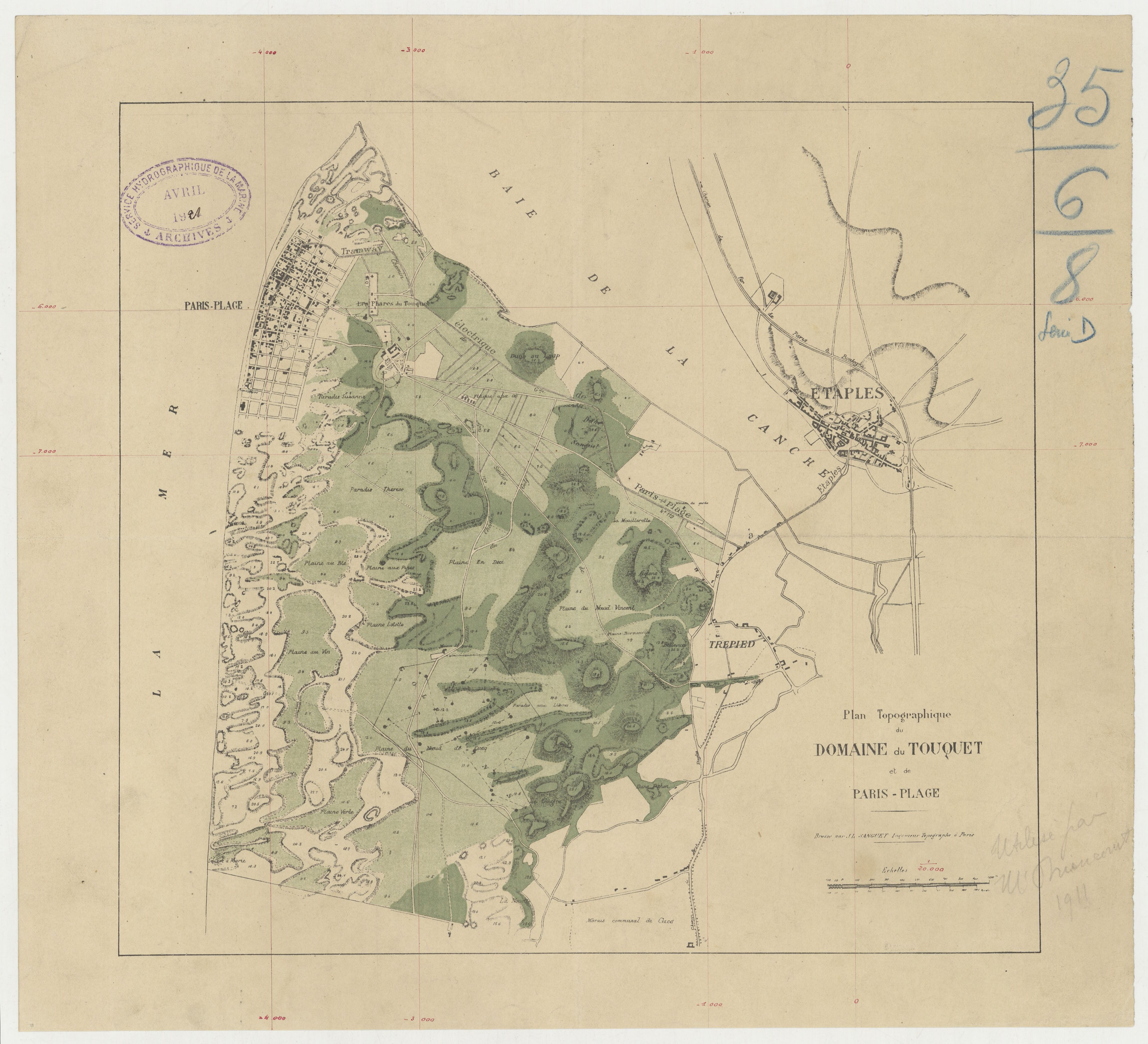
The route of the line (black line running east–west) in 1921

The route started at the railway station in Étaples, which after crossing the city centre, got over the river Canche to Trépied, a hamlet in the commune of Cucq. It then turned right into the forest surrounding Le Touquet, largely following today's Avenue de la Picardie, until arriving at the main street of Le Touquet, the Rue de Paris, where it ended around the centre of the seaside resort (see 1921 map). It was a single-track line with passing loops. The track was laid at 15 kg/m (30 lb/yd) rail weight, which was later changed to a slightly heavier but still relatively light 18 kg/m (36 lb/yd); rails running in built-up areas had a 36 kg/m (73 lb/yd) profile embedded in the pavement. The route is relatively flat but had curve radii as tight as 20 m (66 ft).

Service facilities were located at the eastern end of the railway line. In Étaples, a building was used for transshipment operations with the main railway line. The steam power station providing the line with 600 V direct current power supply as well as a rolling stock depot in Trépied. The power was distributed via overhead lines suspended from wooden transmission poles.

The line was dotted with passenger stops. The ones in the forest featured half-timbered roofed buildings with benches, which served as shelters. A passenger terminal was built at the Paris-Plage terminus. It was initially a modest brick passenger building decorated with wooden half-timbering, but as traffic grew, a larger, more elaborate station with arches, a pediment, and a terrace was built. This building also served as a terminus for the Berck-Plage - Paris-Plage line.

=== Passenger service ===
Raw data

At the time of opening, the company ran 12 connections per day spaced about 1-1.5 hours apart, with a scheduled time of 25 minutes in one direction. Until World War I, the timetable was enhanced to 18 connections in peak season (1 June to 30 September). In the 1920s and 1930s, up to 32 shuttles ran daily, providing a regular half-hourly service at certain times of the day.

The schedule of the train was synchronised with train arrivals on the main line in Étaples. Additionally, the Compagnie des chemins de fer du Nord and the Société du Tramway d'Étaples à Paris-Plage issued joint tickets for the journey to Le Touquet. However, no such agreements existed with the operator of the rail line to Berck and as such any transfer opportunities between the trains of these two networks would be coincidental.

=== Rolling stock ===
The fleet consisted of tram-like two-axle carriages and locomotives produced by a consortium of Société Alsacienne de Constructions Mécaniques and Compagnie Française Thomson-Houston, a General Electric subsidiary. Seven motor cars (numbered 1 to 7) were delivered to the tramway in two series: three in 1900 and four later in the 1900s. By 1912, there were also nine trailers and four baggage wagons. The fleet eventually numbered eleven trams and twelve trailers, plus the baggage wagons. The baggage wagons were necessary because the line offered luggage service for passengers.

== Closure ==
In the 1930s, the rail line came under competition from buses. Winter services were discontinued. By 1938, the trams only ran between 9 July and 31 August. Public tram services were reinstated on 2 October 1939, but suspended during the Battle of France in 1940, never to resume. The line was used by the German army during 1942 and 1943 for building the Atlantic Wall. It was heavily damaged during the bombardments of 1944, which rendered its repair economically unviable. The tramway disappeared from official railway registers in 1953; its track was dismantled and the remaining equipment scrapped.
