= Chemins de fer d'Aire à Fruges et de Rimeux-Gournay à Berck =

Railway in Pas-de-Calais, France

Aire–Fruges and Rimeux-Gournay–Berck railway
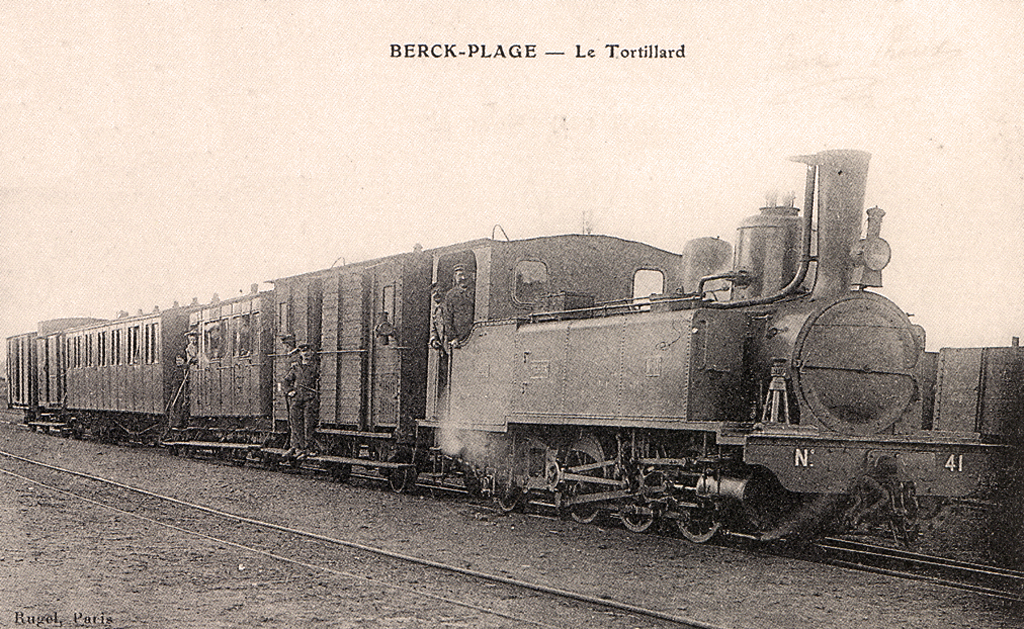
- A train at Berck-Plage

Overview
- Native name: Chemins de fer d'Aire à Fruges et de Rimeux-Gournay à Berck
- Status: Closed
- Locale: Pas-de-Calais, France
- Termini: Aire-sur-la-Lys; Berck
- Stations: 41

History
- Opened: 28 July 1891
- Closed: 31 March 1955

Technical
- Line length: 97 kilometres (60.27 mi)
- Number of tracks: Single track
- Track gauge: 1,000 mm (3 ft 3 3/8 in) metre gauge

The Aire–Fruges and Rimeux-Gournay–Berck railway (French: Chemins de fer d'Aire à Fruges et de Rimeux-Gournay à Berck, pronounced [ʃəmɛ̃ də fɛʁ dɛʁ a fʁyʒ e də ʁimø ɡuʁnɛ a bɛʁk]; CF du ARB) was a 1,000 mm (3 ft 3 3/8 in) metre gauge railway from Aire-sur-la-Lys to Berck, in the Pas-de-Calais department of France. It opened in 1891 and closed in 1955.

== Background ==
In France, the building of railways was controlled by the Government. This avoided the duplication of routes that was seen in the United Kingdom and meant that the large cities and towns were connected. The citizens of the smaller towns and villages also wanted railways to be built to connect them to the network. The departments were given authority to oversee the construction of these minor lines, some of which were built to standard gauge and others were narrow gauge.

The Loi Migneret of 12 July 1865 established that railways in France were to be classified as of "General Interest" (French: Intérêt Général) or "Local Interest" (French: Intérêt Local). The former were deemed to be of sufficient importance that they could be partly charged to the state. The latter were charged to the department. The CF du ARB came under the control of the Pas-de-Calais department.

== History ==
Rang-du-Fliers was connected to the railway network in November 1847 with the opening of the Longueau–Boulogne railway. It is located 7 kilometres (4 mi) from Berck-Plage, which was to develop into a fashionable health resort. A proposal in 1871 to connect Berck to Montreuil with a metre gauge railway was turned down. It was put forward again in 1882 and received authorisation. Also in that year, a standard gauge branch was proposed from Rang-du-Fliers to Berck. In 1886, a M. Macquet was given permission to build a metre gauge railway from Verton to Berck, but he was unable to raise the capital to build it. M. Lambert was given permission that year to build lines from Aire-sur-la-Lys to Fruges and also from Renty to Hucqueliers. The final proposal was to build a line from Berck to Rimieux-Gournay to join the existing Chemin de fer d'Anvin à Calais (CF AC) line, and then from the CF AC another branch to Aire-sur-la-Lys. In April 1887, an agreement was signed with the CF AC to obtain running powers over the section in question.

Plans for the new line were exhibited at the council offices in Montreuil and Saint-Omer during April and May 1887. No objections were received. On 12 December 1889, the préfet declared the railway to be d'utilite publique (in the public interest) and M. Lambert was given permission to build the line. In June 1890, La Compagnie des Chemins de Fer d'Aire à Fruges et de Rimeux-Gournay à Berck was formed to build and operate the railway. The Chemins de Fer du Nord (CF du Nord) advanced ₣3.8 million to build the line, an average of ₣43,000 per kilometre. The CF AC had cost an average of ₣77,000 to build ten years earlier.

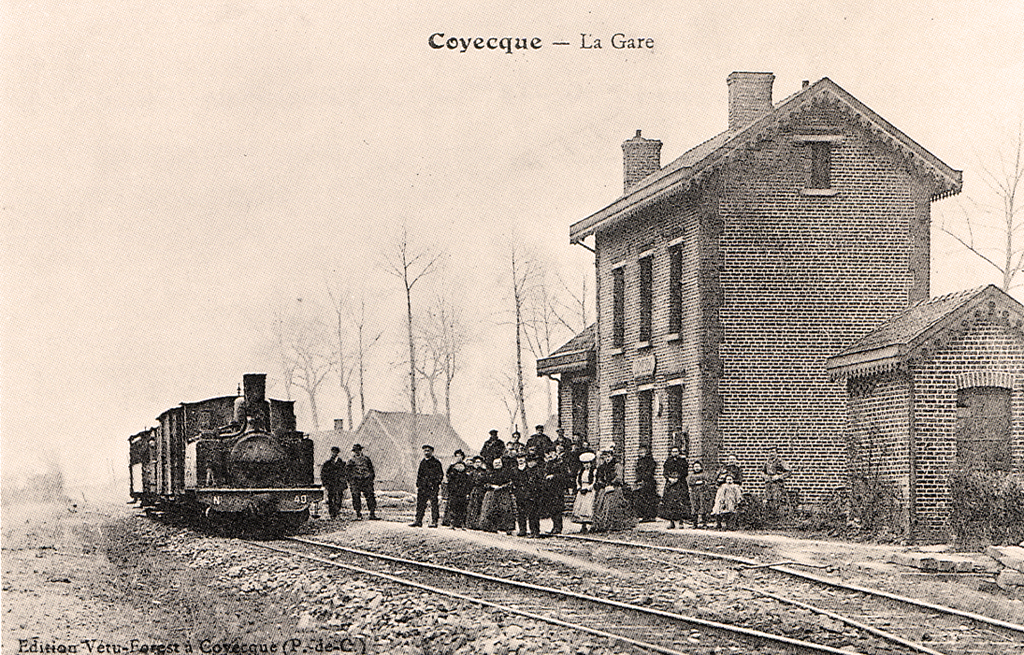
A train at Coyecques, early C20th.

The first section of line, the 20 kilometres (12.43 mi) from Montreuil-St-Justin to Berck-Place was opened on 9 July 1891 by M. Ribot, the Minister for Foreign Affairs and Deputy of the Pas-de-Calais department and M. Guyot, Minister for Public Works. The line was extended a further 2 kilometres (1.2 mi) to Montreuil-sur-Mer station on the Saint-Pol-sur-Ternoise–Étaples railway on 6 April 1893. The 33 kilometres (20.51 mi) line from Aire-sur-la-Lys to Gourgesson, on the CF AC, opened on 1 June 1893 and the final 35 kilometres (21.75 mi) section from Rimeux-Gournay of the CF AC to Montreuil-sur-Mer opened on 30 July. With the 9 kilometres (5.59 mi) of line shared with the CF AC, the line was 97 kilometres (60.27 mi) long. Although initially operated as separate systems, by 1893 the AC and CF du ARB were being run as on, with locomotives and rolling stock from one line being used on the other.

Aire-sur-la-Lys and Berck are 64 kilometres (39.77 mi) apart in a straight line. The line was much longer due to the need to avoid heavy engineering and serve the communities along the route. Rails were 20 kilograms per metre (40 lb/yd), with a standard length of 11 metres (36 ft). Apart from one bridge over a road at Wailly-Beauchamp and the bridge over the railway at Rang-du-Fliers, all crossings were on the level. The maximum gradient was 17mm/metre, apart from one 40 metres (44 yd) stretch of 2.4 mm/metre at Gournay. There were at least 43 level crossings, including five on the stretch of line shared with the CF AC. The majority of level crossings were ungated.

In 1892, a railway was planned from Dompierre-sur-Authie, Somme to Wailly, linking with the Réseau des Bains de Mer system. The 26-kilometre (16.16 mi) long line would have had intermediate stations at Tortefontaine, Douriez, Saulchoy, Saint-Rémy-au-Bois, Campagne-les-Hesdin, Buire-le-Sec and Bois-Jean.

In 1909, the station building at Berck-Plage was demolished and rebuilt in the "grand hotel" style. In 1910, an alternative plan was put forward for a railway from Dompierre-sur-Authie to Berck. The CF du ARB carried 501,208 passengers in 1911. In 1913, plans were put forward for an electric tramway from Bruay-la-Buissière to Aire-sur-la-Lys, with the section of the CF du ARB from Aire-sur-la-Lys to Fruges being electrified, and a rebuilding of the station at Fruges. The plan for the electric tramway was not resurrected post-war. None of the lines were built.

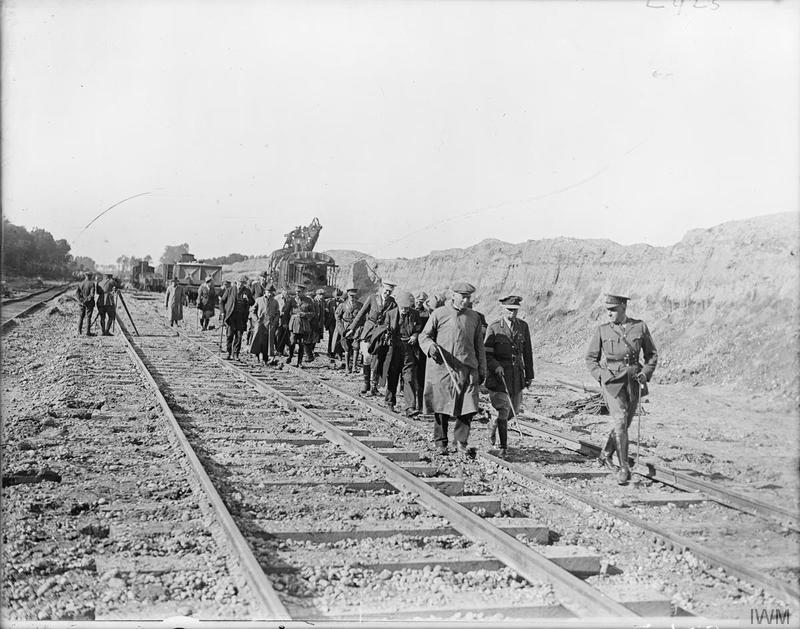
Canadian journalists visiting the depot at Rang-du-Fliers in July 1918. Note metre gauge line on right.

The CF du ARB remained behind Allied lines during World War I. It fell within a security zone known as the Reserved Zone. Civilians living within this zone had free travel within the Canton in which they lived. To travel beyond their own Canton, or in and out of the Reserved Zone, a sauf-conduit (identity card) was required. Civilian passengers had to leave their train and go into the station building to have their papers checked when crossing Cantons. A procedure which led to complaints as some passengers missed their train when it departed whilst their papers were being checked. Military personnel had their papers checked on board the train. Services were reduced in frequency, with military and freight traffic taking priority. Civilian services were reduced during the war, with further reductions inn 1917 and 1918. In March and April 1918, Aire-sur-la-Lys came within shelling range of German artillery following gains made by the Germans during the Spring Offensive. In late April, 296 Railway Company, Royal Engineers established a major depot at Rang-du-Fliers. This included a repair facility for both standard- and metre-gauge locomotives. Aire-sur-la-Lys was bombed on 16 May, but damage to tracks was repaired within 24 hours. In August, a chord was laid at Gourgesson Junction enabling trains to run directly between Aire-sur-la-Lys and Anvin without reversing.

At the end of the war, the railway was suffering from locomotives that were under-maintained, and some of its rolling stock had been transferred to other lines during the war. On the other hand, it had gained some rolling stock from other lines and there was captured German rolling stock which had been declared a prize of war. Locomotive deficiencies due to the war would affect the CF du ARB until 1925. In 1919, the CF du ARB was acquired by the Compagnie Générale des Voies Ferrées d'Intérêt Local (VFIL), along with the Ardres–Pont-d'Ardres steam tram (French: Tramway à vapeur d'Ardres à Pont d'Ardres TvAPA), CF AC and CF des Flandres in the Nord department.

In 1924, a proposal was made to convert the line between Aire-sur-la-Lys and Thérouanne to standard gauge. In 1925, the department reported on the lateness of trains on the CF du ARB. It was explained that this was caused by the fact that all passenger services were provided by means of mixed trains, and locomotive maintenance deficiencies due to the war were still causing problems. In 1930, third class was abolished on the CF du ARB, and carriages were reclassified as second class. In 1937, Berck town council proposed that the line between Rang-du-Fliers and Berck Plage be converted to three-rail dual gauge. This proposal was rejected by VFIL and the department. VFIL objected on cost grounds - ₣1.38 million per kilometre for track and ₣3.5 million for a 30-tonne standard gauge steam locomotive.

World War II broke out on 3 September, with Calais falling into German hands on 25 May 1940. The Pas-de-Calais department became a zone of special control, administered by the Oberkommando der Wehrmacht in Brussels, Belgium. Along the coast was the "red zone". It was said that French law did not apply in this zone. Under the terms of the armistice, France was to hand over its railways to the Germans undamaged and was to work with the German authorities to restore them to serviceable condition. In May 1942, a branch line was built at Berck-Ville to connect with the aerodrome, then in use by the Luftwaffe. Services were again reduced due to the German authorities requisitioning some of the locomotives and stock of the CF du ARB. Military services took priority over civilian services. In September 1943, eight bogie carriages were severely damaged when Berck-Plage came under heavy bombardment. Some of the carriages were running in December with missing glass, leading to complaints in a local newspaper.

By May 1945, services on the CF du ARB had been reduced even further, caused mainly by a shortage of fuel. They were worse than they had been a year earlier, although an increase in the number of trains was made in 1946. In 1948, the department tried to have the concession to run the CF du ARB removed from VFIL, claiming that the latter were unreliable concessionaires. This was vigorously opposed by VFIL, who retained the concession until closure. On 1 September 1952, the Aire-sur-la-Lys - Fruges section of line was closed. The local newspaper in Aire-sur-la-Lyse foresaw the closing of the remaining lines. Aire-sur-la-Lys was to lose its passenger services on the Standard gauge Saint-Omer–Berguette line on 3 October 1954. The remainder of the CF du ARB closed on 1 March 1955. The closure was lamented by "the Voice of the North" (French: La Voix du Nord), which published a song to mark the end. The last service from Berck-Plage was operated by a Billard A150D6 railcar. Buses replaced passenger trains, with SNCF providing a freight service using lorries.

== Operation ==
The CF du ARB was operated in a similar manner to the CF AC. The line was operated on a token system. Unusually for France, where a paper token was the norm for minor lines, brass tokens were in use. If two or more trains were to travel in the same direction, a paper token was issued to all but the last train, which carried the brass token. Trains had a crew of three: the conducteur or chef de train (guard), who was in overall charge of the train, the chauffeur (fireman) and the mécanicien (driver). At stations, the departure of a train would be signalled by the station master blowing a whistle. The conducteur then blew a small trumpet to indicate that he agreed the train was ready to depart, and the mécanicien then started the train. No through ticketing arrangement existed with the CF du Nord.

== Stations ==
Stations were of a standard design with a two-storey main building and a single story wing for freight. Halts just had a single storey building, all of which were later extended. Arrêts were provided with a small shelter.

Station	Photo	Type	Distance km (mi)	Elevation m (ft)	Notes
Aire-sur-la-Lys (fr)		station	0.0 (0)	22 (72)	Shared with Chemins de Fer du Nord.
Moulin-le-Comte		station	2.7 (1.7)	21 (69)	
Mametz		station	6.7 (4.2)	47 (154)	
Crecques		arrêt	7.9 (4.9)	46 (151)	Opened between 1894 and 1909.
Thérouanne (fr)		station	11.5 (7.1)	38 (125)	
Delettes		station	15.2 (9.4)	45 (148)	
Coyecques		station	18.2 (11.3)	53 (174)	
Dennebroeucq		station	22.1 (13.7)	74 (243)	
Mencas-Bellefontaine		halt	24.3 (15.1)	68 (223)	
Matringhem		station	26.6 (16.5)	77 (253)	
Lugy		arrêt	29.1 (18.1)	91 (299)	
Gourgesson		arrêt	30.7 (19.1)	92 (302)	CF AC
Fruges		station (type 1)	33.1 (20.6)	96 (315)	CF AC
Coupelle-Vielle		halt	35.2 (21.9)	106 (348)	CF AC
Rimeux-Gournay		station (type 2)	39.5 (24.5)	162 (531)	CF AC
Gournay		arrêt	40.7 (25.3)	150 (490)	Opened between 1896 (approved in that year) and 1909.
Verchoq		station	43.9 (27.3)	91 (299)	
Rumilly		station	46.3 (28.8)	96 (315)	
Aix-en-Ergny		arrêt	47.9 (29.8)	101 (331)	
Ergny		station	48.6 (30.2)	102 (335)	
Wicquinghem		station	51.5 (32.0)	114 (374)	
Bourthes		arrêt	53.8 (33.4)	149 (489)	Opened between 1894 and 1909.
Hucqueliers		station	55.7 (34.6)	145 (476)	
Preures		station	58.3 (36.2)	83 (272)	
Enquin-sur-Ballons			60.8 (37.8)	58 (190)	Originally a halt; upgraded to a station between 1909 and 1913.
Engoudsent		arrêt	63.7 (39.6)	50 (160)	Opened between 1894 and 1909.
Beussent		station	65.0 (40.4)	31 (102)	
Inxent		arrêt	66.3 (41.2)	31 (102)	
Recques-sur-Course		station	68.1 (42.3)	29 (95)	
Estréeles		arrêt	70.4 (43.7)	14 (46)	
La Paix Faite		arrêt	72.8 (45.2)	8 (26)	
Montreuil-sur-Mer		station	74.9 (46.5)	8 (26)	Shared with Chemins de Fer du Nord.
Montreuil St. Justin		station	76.7 (47.7)	35 (115)	
Campigneulles-les-Petites		station	78.6 (48.8)	46 (151)	
Wailly (fr)		station	82.7 (51.4)	43 (141)	
Bahot (fr)		halt	85.6 (53.2)	47 (154)	
Verton-Bourg (fr)		station	89.1 (55.4)	9 (30)	
Rang-du-Fliers		station	90.7 (56.4)	9 (30)	Shared with Chemins de Fer du Nord.
PN Rang-du-Fliers		arrêt	91.9 (57.1)	5 (16)	"PN" stands for passage à niveau (level crossing).
Berck-Ville		station	95.1 (59.1)	8 (26)	
Berck-Plage		station	96.9 (60.2)	7 (23)	Original station.

For further details of stations marked "CF AC", refer to the article on that system.

Industries served by the line included a pair of factories at Moulin-le-Comte, a cement factory and quarry at Vincly, quarries at Matringhem, Wailly and Verton, Messrs Albert & Lerroy's brickworks at Attin, Messrs Garry's sucrerie at Rang-du-Fliers and Messrs Soubitez's sawmill at Berck-Plage.

== Rolling stock ==
=== Locomotives ===
The CF du ARB owned the following steam locomotives.

No.	Builder	Year	Wheel arrangement	Notes
004 / 31	Corpet-Louvet	1890	0-6-2T	to Réseau des Flandres (RF) in 1894
32	Corpet-Louvet	1891	0-6-2T	to RF in 1894
33	Corpet-Louvet	1891	0-6-2T	to RF in 1894
34	Corpet-Louvet	1891	0-6-2T	to Chemins de Fer de Milly à Formerie et de Noyon à Guiscard et Lassigny in 1894
35	Corpet-Louvet	1891	0-6-2T	
36	Corpet-Louvet	1891	0-6-2T	to RF in 1912
40	Corpet-Louvet	1892	0-6-2T	
41	Corpet-Louvet	1892	0-6-2T	
42	Corpet-Louvet	1892	0-6-2T	
43	Corpet-Louvet	1892	0-6-2T	
44	Corpet-Louvet	1892	0-6-2T	
45	Corpet-Louvet	1892	0-6-2T	
46	Pinguely	1900	0-6-0T	ex Chemin de fer d'Anvin à Calais No. 10

=== Railcars ===
Four railcars carried numbers that suggested they were allocated to the CF du ARB.

No.	Builder	Year	Notes
ARB 1	VFIL, Lumbres	1932	De Dion petrol engine. Scrapped post-1955
ARB 3	VFIL, Lumbres	1932	Unic diesel engine. Scrapped post-1955.
ARB 4	VFIL, Lumbres	1933/4	Unic diesel engine. Scrapped post-1955.
ARB 5	VFIL, Lumbres	1933/4	Unic diesel engine. Scrapped post-1955.

=== Passenger stock ===
For the opening of the line, the CF du ARB bought ten bogie carriages with end platforms. Four were tri-composites, seating 6 first class, 7 second class and 40 third class. The other six were composites, seating 12 first class and 27 second class. By 1911, there were sixteen bogie carriages, comprising nine tri-composites, five composites and two all-thirds. There were also twelve baggage vans.

=== Freight stock ===
By 1911, the CF du ARB owned 43 flat wagons, 71 open wagons, 34 vans and a crane.

== Sources ==
- Davies, W.J.K. (2000). Minor Railways of France. East Harling: Plateway Press. ISBN 1871980453.
- Farebrother, Martin J B; Farebrother, Joan S (2008). Tortillards of Artois. Usk: The Oakwood Press. ISBN 0853615543.
