= TER-GV =

TER-GV, a portmanteau of TER (Train Express Régional, "express regional train") and TGV (Train à Grande Vitesse, "high-speed train"), are regional TGV linking relatively nearby cities (termini being 100–200 km apart) using the LGV Nord dedicated high-speed line (Paris-Lille-Calais). So far, those trains only operate in the Hauts-de-France region.

In 2001, the first three lines were opened:

- Lille-Europe–Dunkerque (30 min): The first half of the journey is made on the LGV Nord until a junction near Hazebrouck after which the train continues at lower speed on the conventional line to Dunkerque.
- Lille-Europe–Calais-Fréthun (30 min) – Calais-Ville (35 min): At the northern end of the LGV Nord in Calais-Fréthun, the train continues toward the Calais-Ville station. Very few trains run on that line.
- Lille-Europe–Calais-Fréthun (30 min) – Boulogne-Ville (55 min) – Étaples-Le Touquet – Gare de Rang-du-Fliers: Until 2010, the line ended in Boulogne. This line now runs until Rang-du-Fliers-Verton. At the northern end of the LGV Nord in Calais-Fréthun, the train continues on the conventional line at lower speed toward Boulogne, Étaples and Rang. Passengers going to Calais-Ville can also use that line, a shuttle service from Calais-Fréthun to Calais-Ville using regular TER trains or buses being available within 30 minutes of the departure/arrival of each train. Some of the trains do not go as far as Rang on the line, but rather have their terminus in Boulogne or Étaples.

A fourth line, Lille-Europe–Arras, was added in 2007. The success of this line led to subsequent capacity increases.
