= Berck-Plage - Paris-Plage line =

French railway line

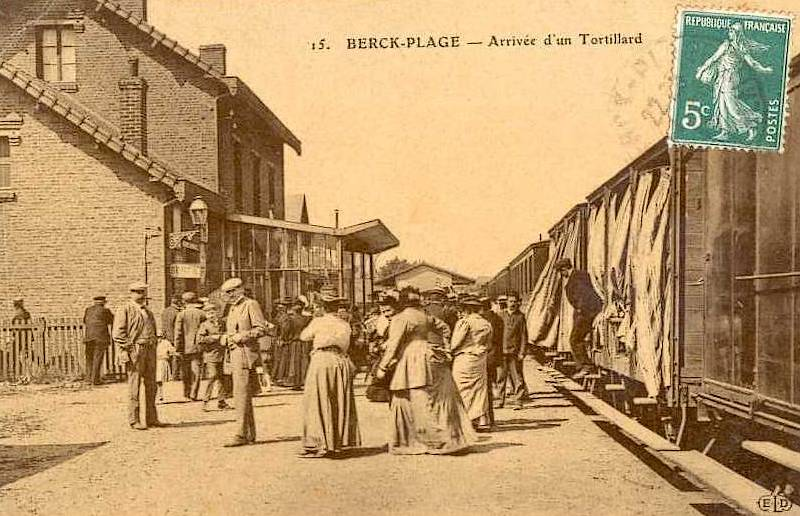
- Arrival of a train at Berck-Plage station

Overview
- Locale: France
- Termini: 1909; 1912

Service
- Operator(s): CF Berck-Plage to Paris-Plage (from 1906)

History
- Closed: 1929

Technical
- Number of tracks: 1
- Track gauge: Metre-gauge railway (1,000 m)
- Electrification: Non-electrified

The Berck-Plage - Paris-Plage line (subsequently designated Le Touquet-Paris-Plage) constituted a narrow-gauge local railway that connected two coastal resorts on the Opal Coast of the English Channel in France. This line served the administrative Pas-de-Calais department and was operational from the early 20th century. The route opened in stages between 1909 and 1912 and operated until it ceased in 1929.

Spanning approximately 17 kilometers (11 mi), the line was owned by a company independent of the major railway networks serving Berck-Plage and Le Touquet-Paris-Plage. It faced significant challenges due to irregular seasonal traffic and the inexperience of its operator in railway management. Nevertheless, this railway is illustrative of the communication modes utilized from the late 19th century until World War II, with the specific intention of serving vacation spots on the northern coasts of France.

== Establishment of the line ==
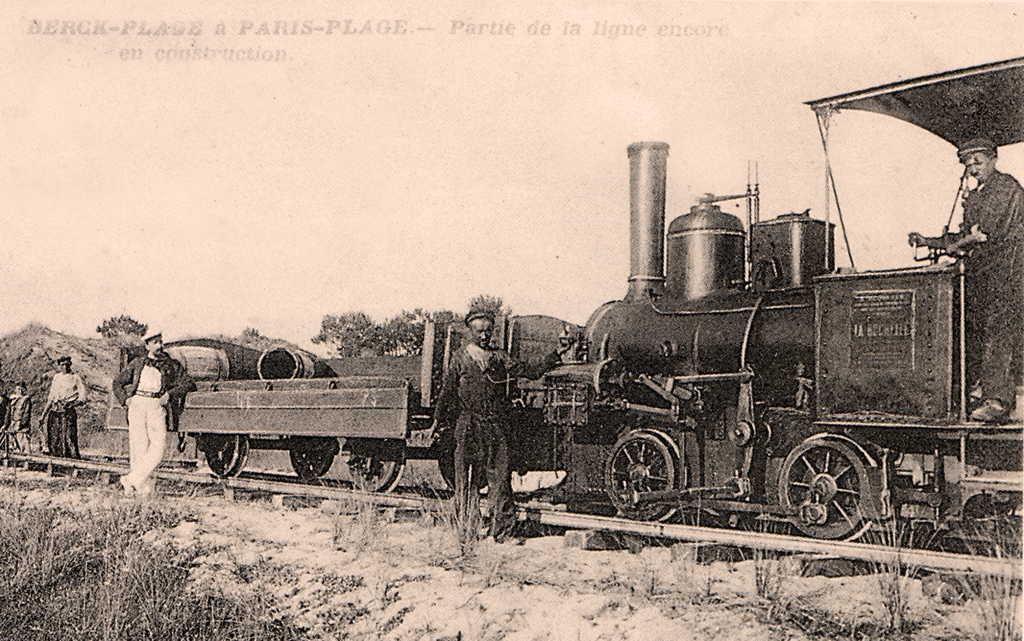
A work train, photographed in 1909 or 1910, on the Merlimont-Plage - Daloz section under construction; in the foreground, locomotive No. 2, 020T Corpet-Louvet.

By the conclusion of the 19th century, a multitude of seaside resorts had been established along the shores of the English Channel and the North Sea, in response to the growing practice of sea bathing and the expansion of summer and weekend tourism. The coastline between the estuaries of the Authie and the Canche rivers, situated on the southern part of the Opal Coast, is characterized by a series of sandy beaches and vacation spots of varying importance, extending from south to north. (Note: The seaside resort of Stella-Plage, located in Cucq between Merlimont and Le Touquet-Paris-Plage, was built after the First World War.) The coastal resorts of Berck-Plage, Merlimont, and Le Touquet-Paris-Plage are located in the region between the estuaries of the Authie and the Canche rivers, on the southern part of the Opal Coast. (Note: Until 28 March 1912 the Paris-Plage resort was located in the municipality of Cucq. From that date, it became a commune and took the name Le Touquet-Paris-Plage; gradually, the name Le Touquet came to prevail in everyday language.) In this context, in 1891, Mr. Lambert, an entrepreneur and founder of the Société des Dunes, sought to develop this coastal area by establishing a railway line connecting Berck-Plage to Paris-Plage, following the coastline. The route was designed to connect with the Aire-sur-la-Lys - Berck-Plage line in the south and the Étaples to Paris-Plage tramway in the north, both of which were planned for implementation shortly. (Note: The first line was opened to Berck-Ville on 6 August 1893 and extended to Berck-Plage on 1 September 1899; the tramway began operating on 10 July 1900.) The request was denied, but the company was granted permission to construct a short narrow-gauge railway between Berck-Plage and the Dunes beach, to transport construction materials for real estate developments that were already underway. This line, which was 2.15 kilometers (1.34 mi) in length, was rapidly completed and likely opened in 1893. However, it only operated for freight transport, and no detailed information is available regarding its operations.

A new request was made in the early 20th century by Paul Berger and Charles Roy, who were responsible for establishing the Société du Chemin de Fer de Berck-Plage à Paris-Plage (B.P.). The declaration of public utility was signed on 27 April 1906, and work commenced. The existing line was reinforced, and the remainder of the route was opened in successive sections:

- The route traversed on 7 August 1909, commenced at Berck-Plage, a shared station connecting with the Aire-sur-la-Lys to Berck-Plage line, and concluded at Merlimont.
- From Merlimont to Daloz (at the entrance to Paris-Plage), on 19 June 1910;
- From Daloz to Paris-Plage (a shared station connecting with the Étaples to Paris-Plage tramway), on 28 July 1912.

== Route and technical features ==
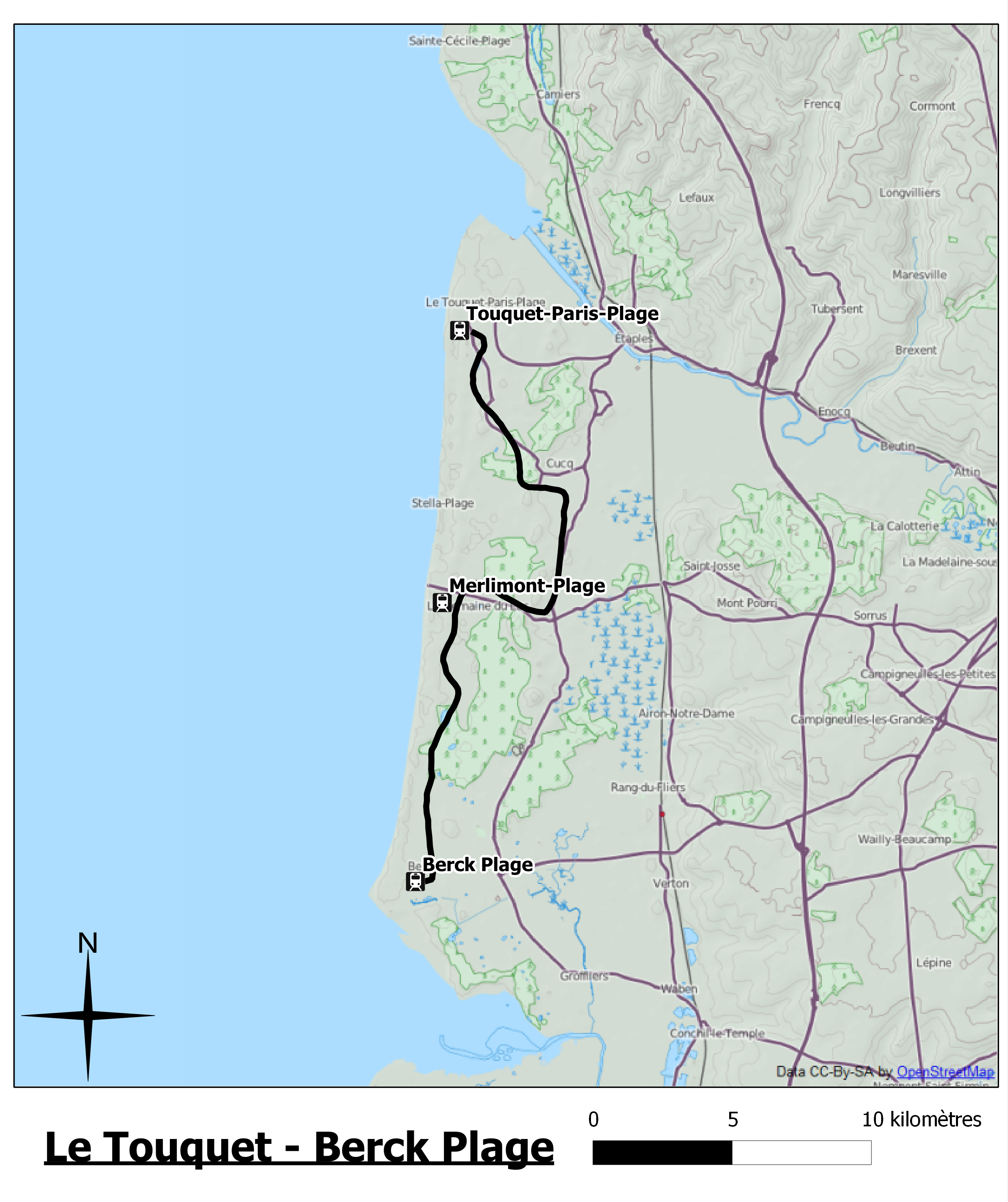
Line layout.

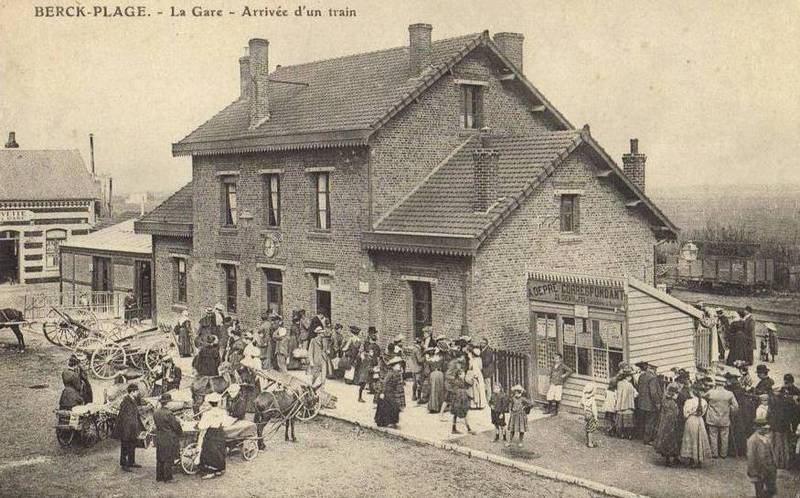
Berck-Plage station (before reconstruction), the joint terminus of the Aire-sur-la Lys and Paris-Plage lines.

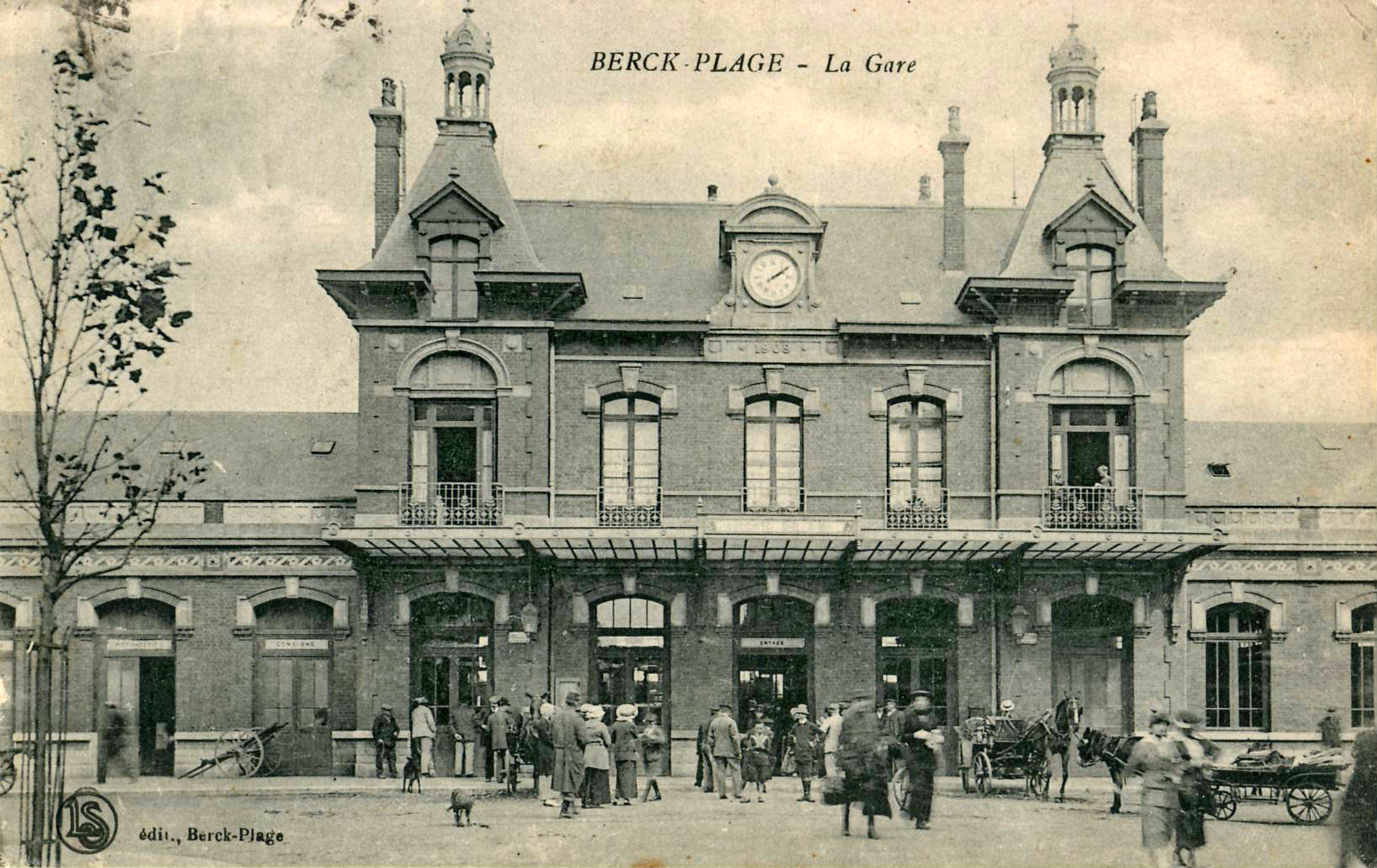
The new Berck-Plage railway station, circa 1917.

The line, with a total length of 17.2 kilometers (10.7 mi), originated at Berck-Plage, sharing facilities with the Aire-sur-la-Lys to Berck-Plage line. It then turned north and closely followed the coastline until reaching Merlimont, where it crossed the dunes along the Channel. Subsequently, the line moved slightly inland, serving Cucq, before reaching Paris-Plage, where it skirted the golf course. After the freight facilities and the provisional terminus at Daloz, the railway terminated at Rue de Paris, where it shared infrastructure with the Étaples to Paris-Plage tramway. The topography was relatively flat, with only gentle gradients (a maximum of 16%). The narrow-gauge track was predominantly situated on its right-of-way and utilized "Vignole" rails weighing 20 kg/m, except for Paris-Plage, where the tracks were embedded in the road and employed heavier rails of 25 to 30 kg/m. Curves had a minimum radius of 100 meters (330 ft).

In addition to the two terminal stations that are shared with other networks, the sole intermediate station on the route was Merlimont-Plage. This station was notably expansive and aesthetically pleasing for a local railway, with the passenger facility situated separately from the goods shed. Other structures included a depot workshop at Bellevue-les-Dunes, situated a few hundred meters north of Berck, and a goods shed located just before Paris-Plage station. The stops, situated from south to north at Bellevue-les-Dunes, Merlimont-Village, Cucq, Golf, Daloz, and Sémaphore, were relatively simple in design, comprising only a platform and a post displaying the train schedule.

== A short life ==
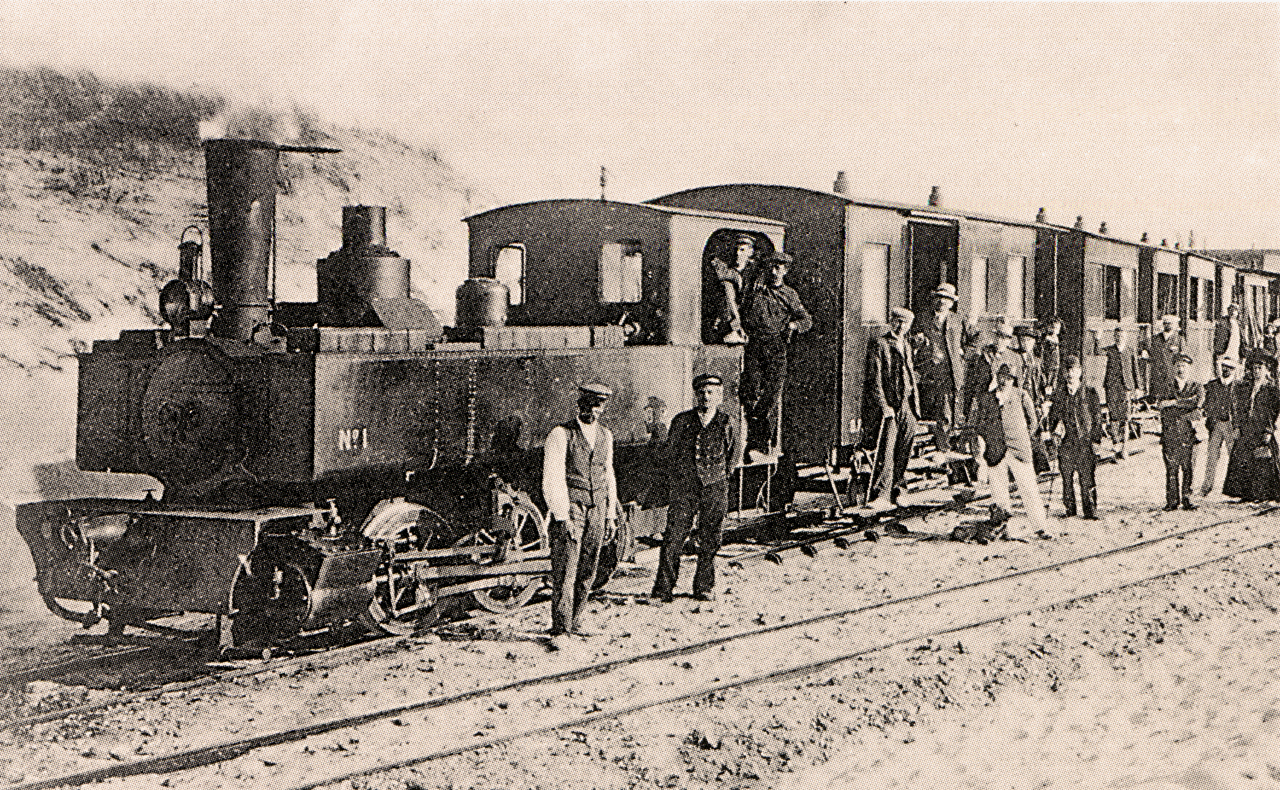
A train stopped in the middle of a dune landscape near Merlimont, headed by locomotive No. 1, 030T Decauville.

Upon the commencement of railway operations in 1909 on the Berck-Plage to Merlimont-Plage section, seven shuttles were in operation on weekdays and eleven on Sundays and holidays. This represented a significantly higher frequency than that of the majority of local railways. Following the inauguration of the Paris-Plage extension (terminating at Daloz) in 1910, the number of daily trips was reduced to eight during the summer, four during the fall, and one during the winter. A mixed train, included in the aforementioned services, was used for transporting freight wagons. The number of shuttles was significantly reduced due to a lack of traction power, which resulted in a considerable increase in operational issues. In the years preceding the First World War, the number of passengers increased steadily, yet freight traffic failed to reach the anticipated levels, despite the installation of dedicated facilities near the Paris-Plage terminus. The railway line completion in 1912 resulted in a lengthy journey between the two terminal stations due to the numerous intermediate stops. Trains required a minimum of one hour and ten minutes to traverse the 17.2-kilometer (10.7 mi) distance, with an average speed of fewer than 15 kilometers per hour (9.3 mph). In 1914, the fare structure was as follows: first class, 1.80 fr; second class, 1.35 fr; and third class, 1 fr.

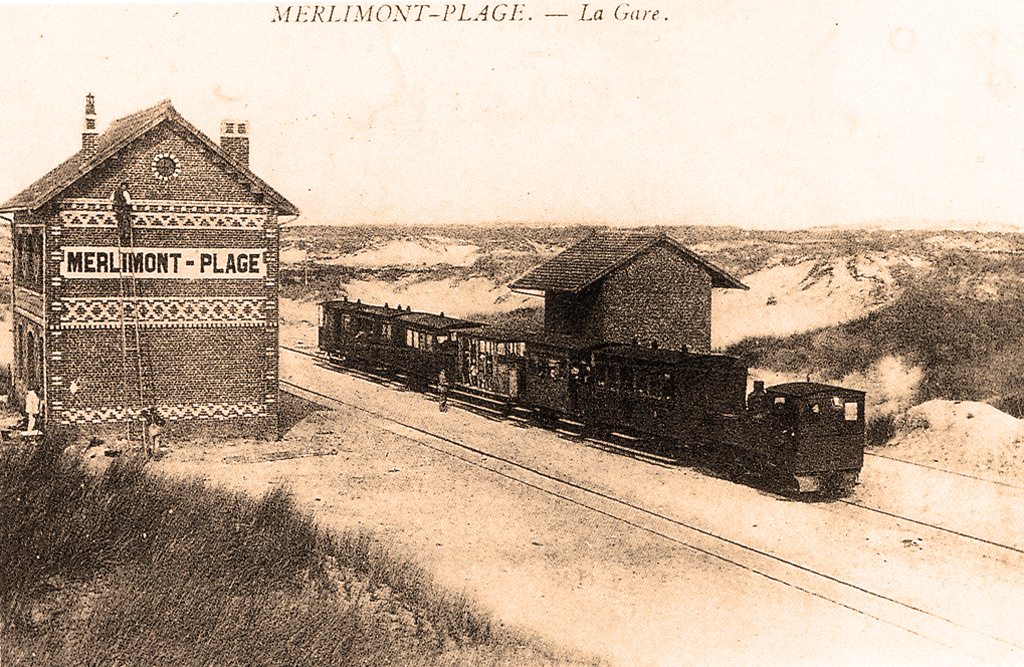
A long train at Merlimont-Plage station; note the open “tapestry” carriage in the middle of the convoy.

As with other railways, operations ceased on 3 August 1914, with the outbreak of war. They did not resume immediately afterward. The army proceeded to dismantle the tracks to supply military lines that were serving the Somme front. The line was rebuilt in 1919, and passenger services were reinstated on 25 July that year. However, the service was now limited to two or three round trips per day along the entire route, with an additional shuttle between Berck-Plage and Merlimont-Plage, and only operated during the summer season from 1 July to 30 September. The reduction in intermediate stops resulted in a one-hour journey, with trains serving only Bellevue-les-Dunes and Merlimont-Plage. Freight service was reinstated on 1 August 1925, at the request of local authorities, but it was unsuccessful due to the railway's inability to attract customers.

In the mid-1920s, bus lines were introduced to serve the communities of Merlimont-Plage and Stella-Plage, which had been designated a "climatic resort" since 1925. These buses ran from the Nord Railway Company's stations on the Amiens-Calais line. The introduction of buses resulted in a loss of passengers for the local railway, as they offered a more direct and faster mode of transportation. This decline in ridership, in conjunction with the progressive encroachment of sand, resulted in the cessation of operations on 30 September 1927. On 26 December 1928 an agreement was reached whereby the railway was purchased by the department. The line was utilized for a brief period of two months in the spring of 1929, facilitating the transportation of materials for the construction of a golf course between Stella-Plage and Paris-Plage. However, it was ultimately deemed unnecessary and permanently abandoned. The line was formally decommissioned by decree on 25 December 1929, and the tracks were subsequently removed in the following months. The passenger buildings at Berck-Plage and Merlimont were preserved; the former now houses a casino, and the latter the local tourist office. In contrast, the Touquet-Paris-Plage station was demolished and replaced with an apartment building. Currently, the Le Touquet-Berck-Plage connection is served by line 42 (Boulogne-Berck) of the Colvert transport system.

== A difficult operation ==
The relatively brief operational lifespan of the line (less than 20 years) and its subsequent closure cannot be attributed to the general factors that contributed to the decline of local railways. These include competition from road transport, chronic deficits that emerged following the First World War or the 1929 crisis, a lack of modernisation, and a waning interest from local authorities in providing subsidies. Additionally, the line was subject to particular constraints, which were further compounded by the inexperience of the Société du Chemin de Fer de Berck-Plage à Paris-Plage in railway operations:

- The brief length of the route, in conjunction with a dearth of collaboration with neighboring networks (including the absence of connections at either end and the lack of shared rolling stock), resulted in elevated operating costs.
- The seasonal nature of the service requires a substantial fleet of vehicles to accommodate peak traffic volumes, yet the majority of these vehicles remain idle for the majority of the year.
- Implementing an intensive service schedule at the outset of operations, coupled with a restricted number of locomotives, gave rise to a considerable number of delays and mechanical failures.
- The deployment of equipment in sandy environments resulted in accelerated deterioration and a concomitant increase in the necessity for maintenance of fixed installations.
- The operating company had not anticipated low freight traffic, which was linked to the route's seaside and seasonal nature, as well as the lack of industries generating significant tonnage. This resulted in heavy investments that were never amortized.

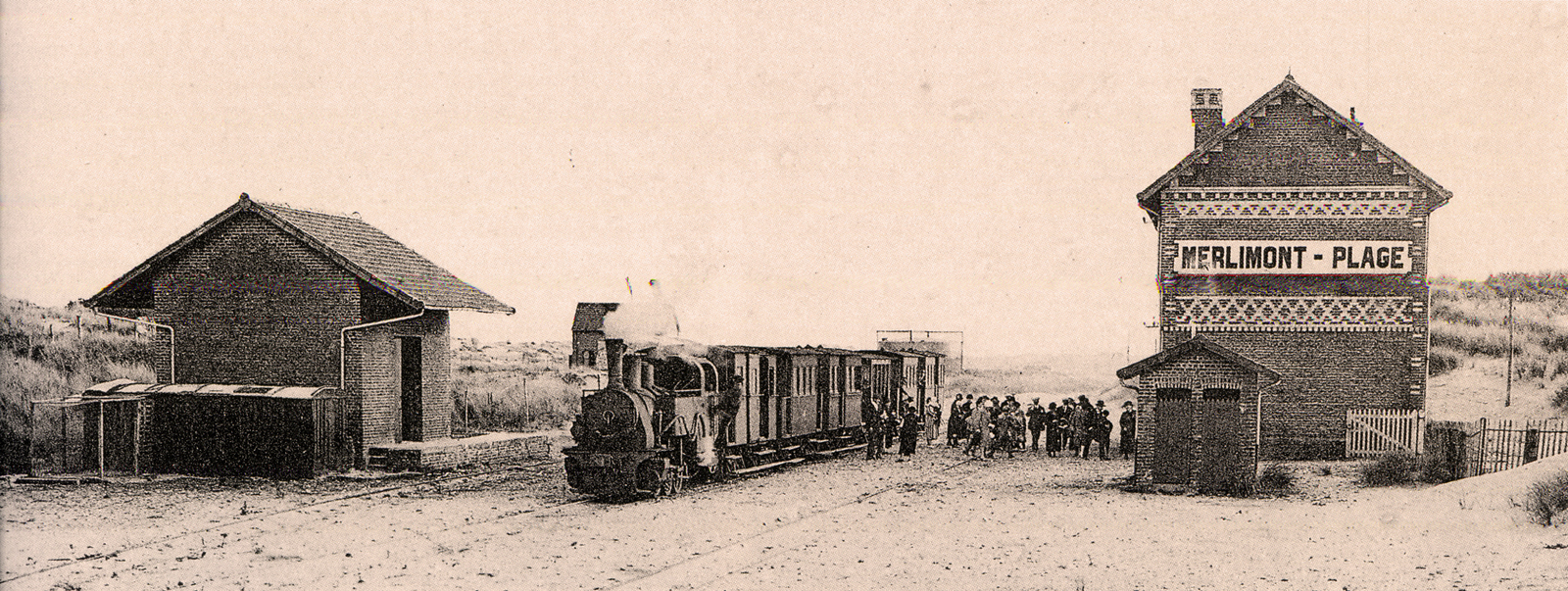
A busy train at Merlimont-Plage station, with locomotive No. 3, 030T Borsig, leading the way.

== Rolling stock ==
=== Locomotives ===
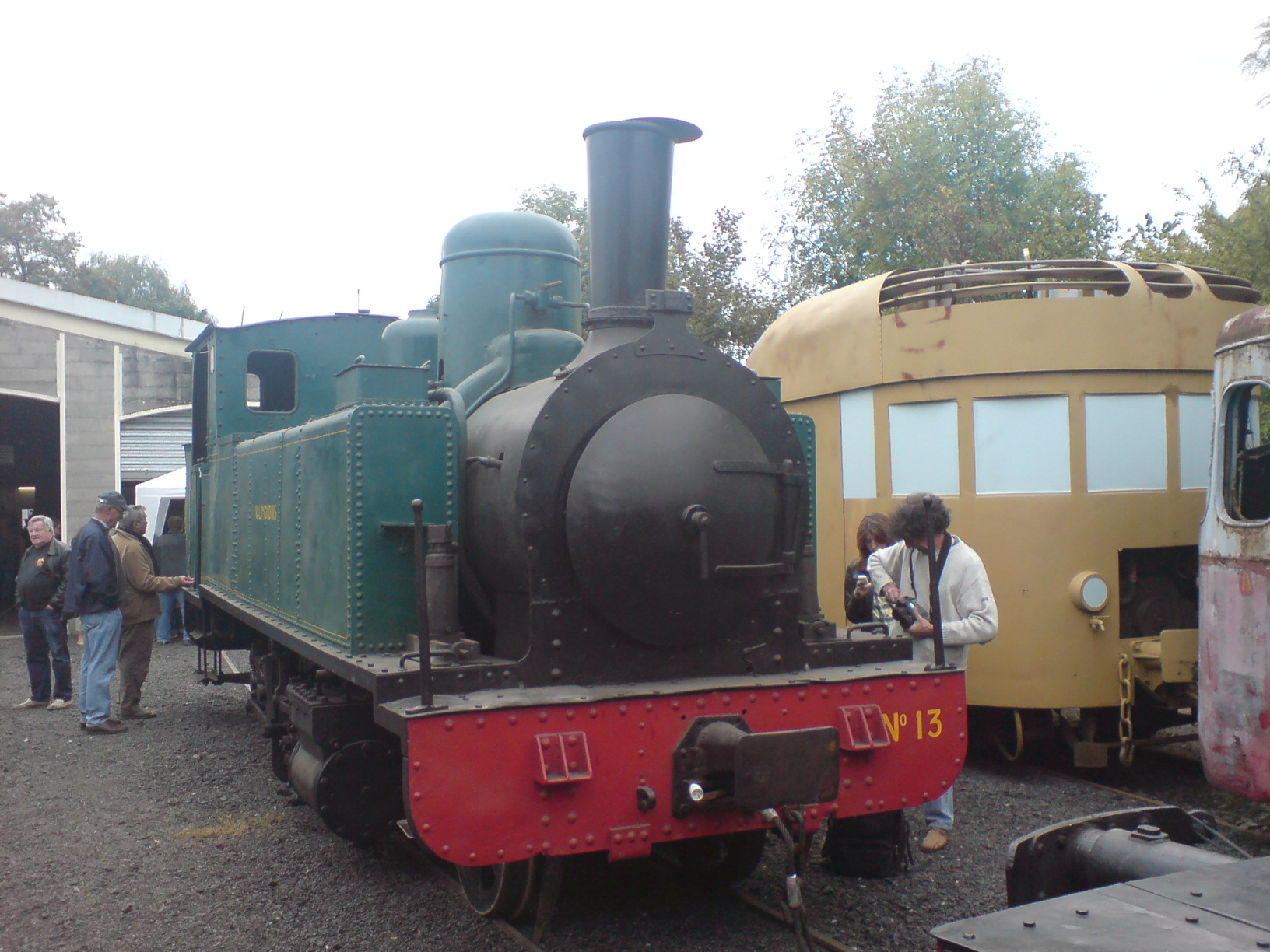
SACM 130T from MTVS.

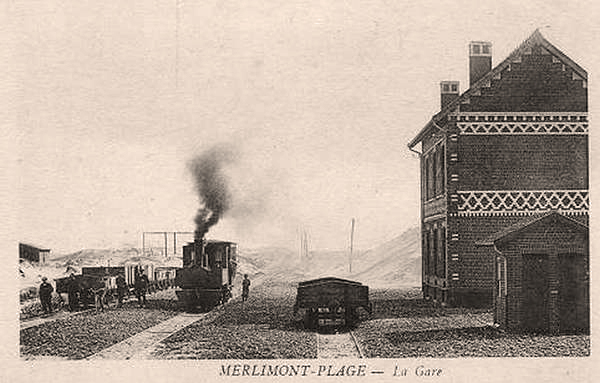
A short, single-car train arrives at Merlimont station.

The locomotive fleet of the line was notable for its considerable heterogeneity, which presented a significant challenge concerning maintenance.

At the inception of operations, two steam locomotives were designated for the purpose of handling heavy traffic: a 0-6-0T (Note: The T next to the number means that this is a locomotive-tender, where the water and fuel tanks are no longer on a separate tender, but on the chassis of the machine itself.) locomotive constructed by Decauville in 1908 and a 0-4-0T locomotive manufactured by Corpet-Louvet. As was the case with the remainder of the rolling stock, these locomotives were equipped with a central buffer and lower coupling, as well as vacuum brakes. The inauguration of the railway and the insufficient number of engines resulted in the acquisition of three additional locomotives: in 1910, a 0-6-0T Borsig of German origin, and in 1912, two 2-6-0T La Meuse locomotives of Belgian origin. These latter two were requisitioned by the military during wartime and were destroyed by an aerial bombing near Albert in 1918.

Following the cessation of operations in 1919, the three oldest locomotives were utilized once more. To compensate for the loss of the two machines, the line received in 1924 two 2-6-0T locomotives, constructed by the Société Alsacienne de Constructions Mécaniques. (Note: One of these machines has been preserved and is now housed in the Musée des Tramways à vapeur et chemins de fer secondaires at Valmondois station.) However, the size of the fleet was no longer justified by the level of traffic, and thus one locomotive was sold to a cement factory in Cher and the other was leased to a brickyard in the vicinity of Berck. The latter was returned to the network for a brief period before being sold with the rest of the equipment when the line ceased operations.

One of the two machines, the 2-6-0T number 3 from 1924, is on display at the Museum of Steam Trams and French Secondary Railways in Butry-sur-Oise. It has been classified as a historical monument.

=== Cars and wagons ===
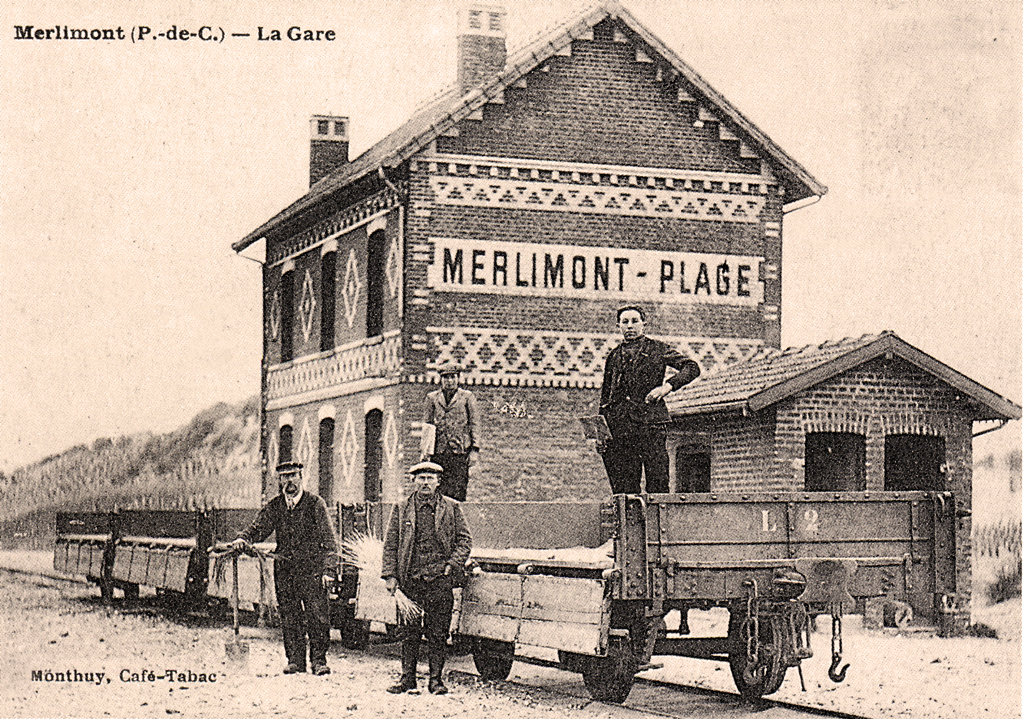
B.P. employees in front of the company's four flatcars.

The towed fleet consisted of two-axle equipment built by Decauville in 1908–1909:

- Four mixed passenger cars (1st/2nd class) with a central platform;
- Two 3rd-class passenger cars with end platforms;
- Two open 3rd-class passenger cars, called "tapisseries";
- Two baggage cars with a postal compartment;
- Two covered wagons;
- Two open wagons;
- Four flat wagons with side panels.

== See also ==
- Voie ferrée d'intérêt local
- Chemins de fer d'Aire à Fruges et de Rimeux-Gournay à Berck
- Côte d'Opale

== Bibliography ==
- Domengie, Henri; Banaudo, José (1994). Les petits trains de jadis : Nord de la France (in French). Vol. 9. Breil-sur-Roya: Éditions du Cabri. ISBN 2908816296.
- Wagner, Claude (2011). Les petits trains de Ch'Nord : Histoire des voies ferrées d'intérêt local du Nord et du Pas-de-Calais (in French). Auray: LR Presse. ISBN 9782903651671.
- Laederich, Pierre (1994). Encyclopédie générale des transports - Chemins de fer (in French). Vol. 9. Valignat: Éditions de l'Ormet. ISBN 2906575135.
- Gonsseaume, Christian (1995). "Le chemin de fer d'intérêt local : Berck - Paris-Plage". Dossiers archéologiques, historiques et culturels du Nord-Pas-de-Calais (in French). 1 (40).
