= Rang-du-Fliers station =

Railway station in France

Coordinates: 50°24′57″N 1°38′54″E

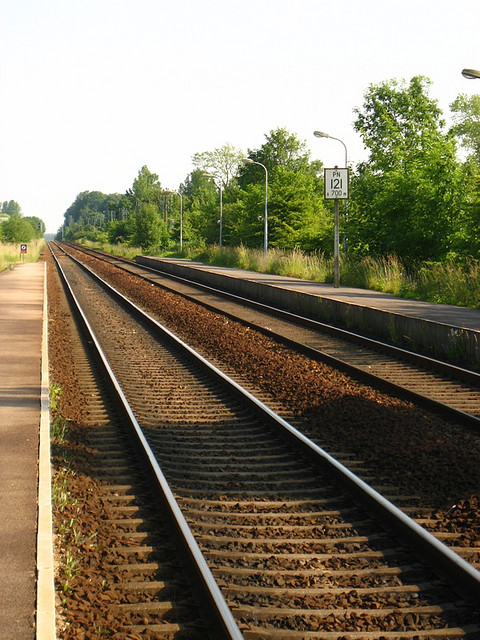
Rang-du-Fliers station

Rang-du-Fliers (also Rang-du-Fliers-Verton and Rang-du-Fliers-Verton-Berck) is a railway station serving the towns Rang-du-Fliers, Verton and Berck, all in the Pas-de-Calais department, northern France.

== Services ==
The station is served by TER Hauts-de-France services between Boulogne-sur-Mer and Amiens. It also sees a TGV service to Arras via Calais-Fréthun. It was formerly a station on the CF du ARB, which closed in 1955.

Preceding station	TER Hauts-de-France	Following station
Étaples–Le Touquet towards Amiens	Krono+ GV K94+	Terminus
Rue towards Paris-Nord	Krono K16	Étaples–Le Touquet towards Calais
Rue towards Amiens	Krono K21	Étaples–Le Touquet towards Calais
Terminus	Proxi P73	Étaples–Le Touquet towards Calais

	Disused railways	
PN Rang-du-Fliers toward Berck-Plage	CF du ARB; Metre gauge	Verton-Bourg toward Aire-sur-la-Lys
Conchil-le-Temple; Towards Amiens. Line open, station closed	Longueau–Boulogne railway	Saint-Josse; Towards Boulogne. Line open, station closed
