= Côte d'Opale =

Coast of northwestern France

Coordinates: 50°30′N 1°35′E

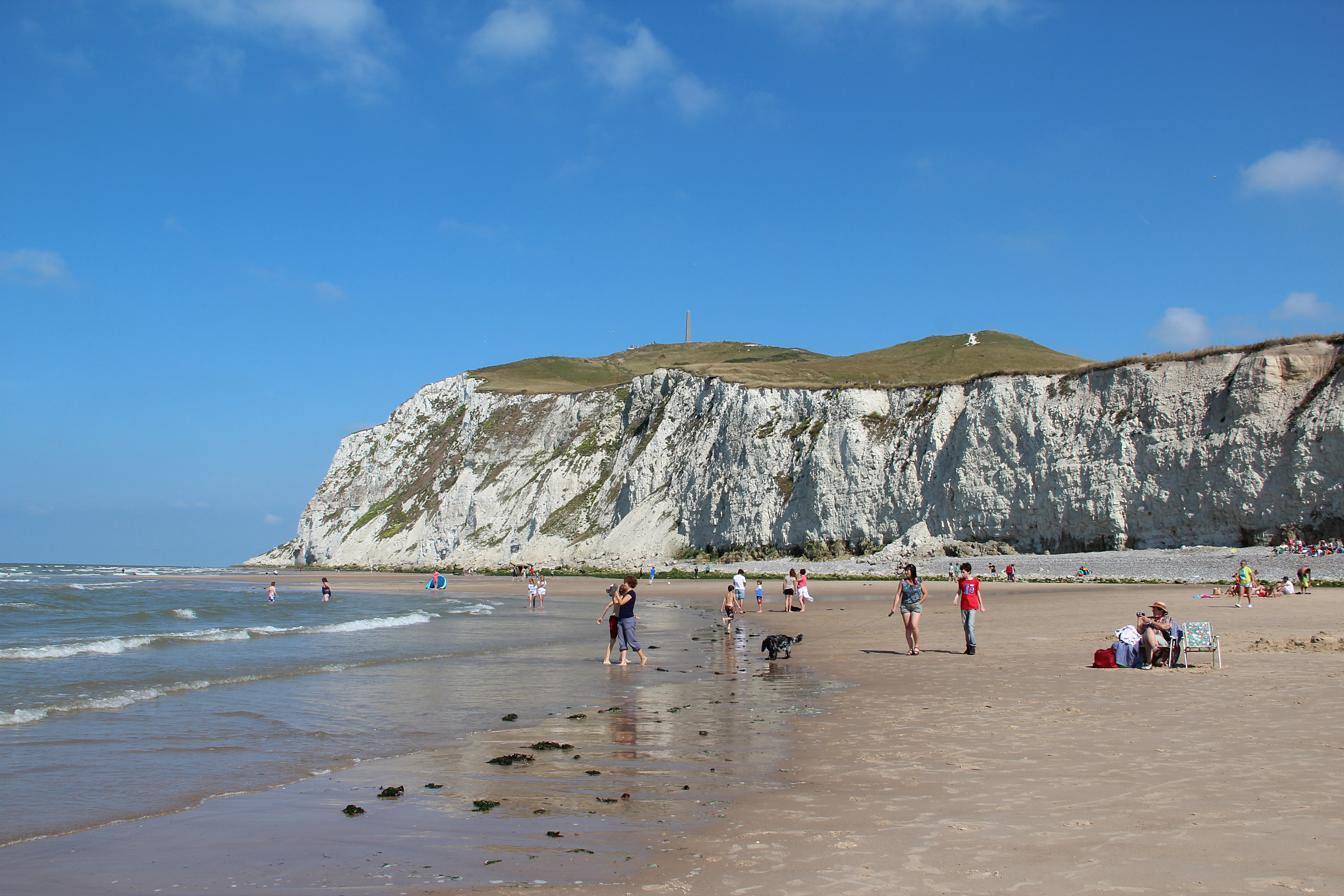
Cape Blanc Nez seen from the beach

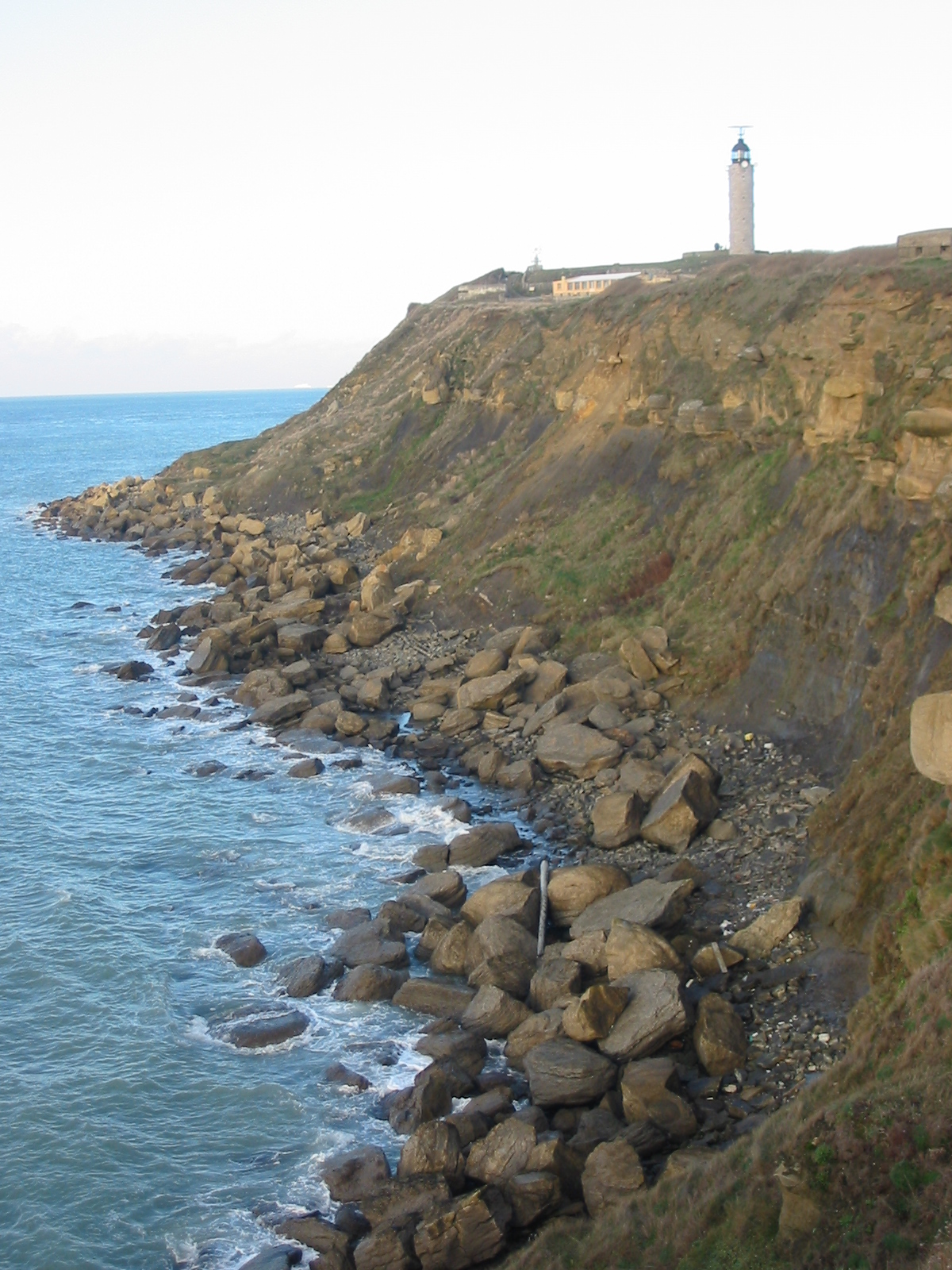
Cape Gris Nez

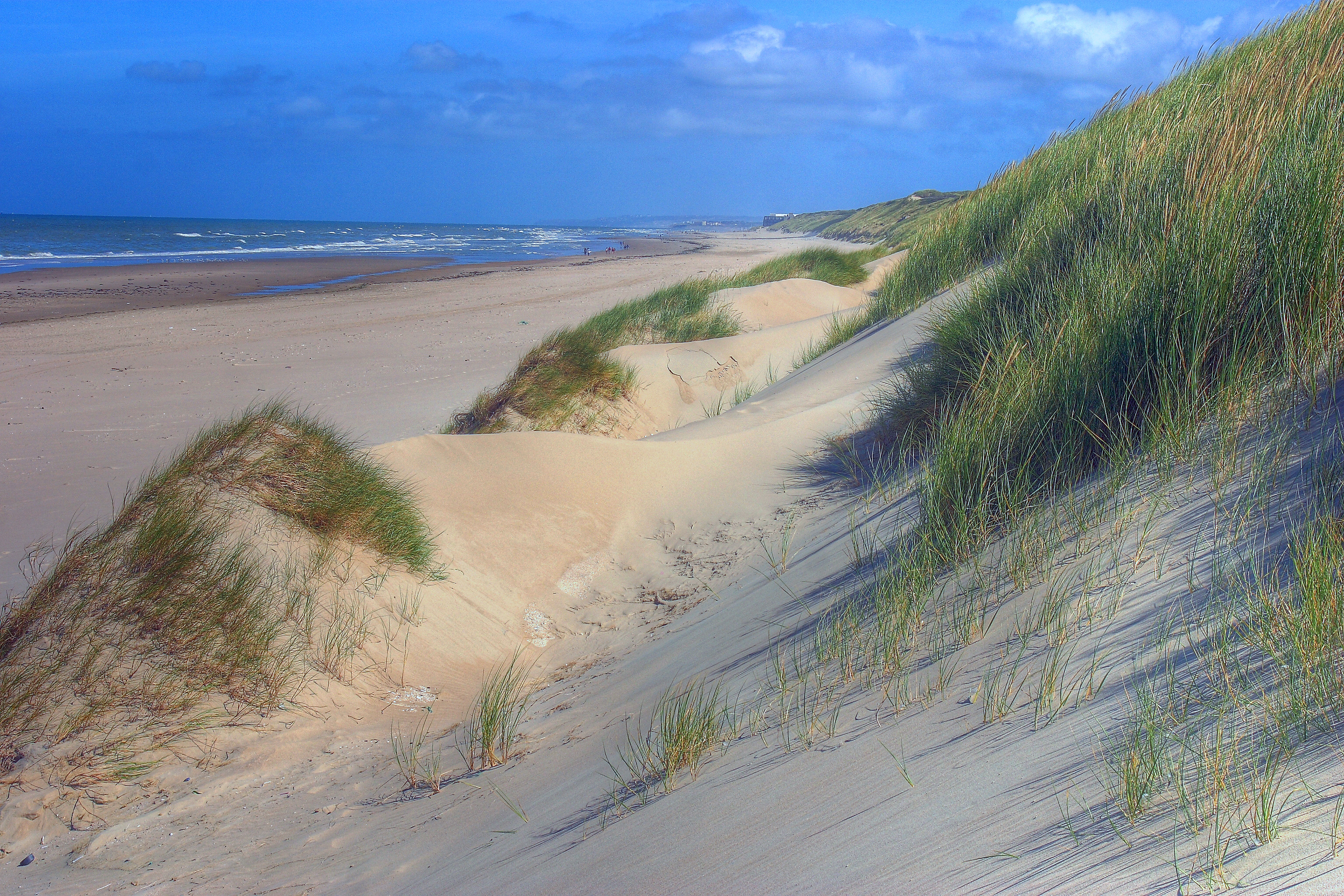
Dunes of Touquet

The Opal Coast (Côte d'Opale (French) French pronunciation: [kot dɔpal]; Opoalkust (West Flemish)) is a coastal region in northern France on the English Channel, popular with tourists.

== Geography ==
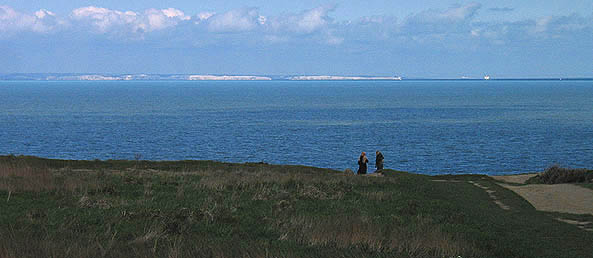
View of the English coast from Côte d'Opale, France

The Côte d'Opale is a coastal region in North Central France, in the departments of Nord and Pas-de-Calais. It extends over 120 kilometres (75 mi) of French coast between the Belgian border and the border with Picardy. This coastline faces the English Channel and the North Sea, and is situated directly opposite the chalk cliffs of southeast England, which at the closest point are only 34 kilometres (21 mi) away.

The Côte d'Opale is composed of many varied landscapes including beaches, dunes, swamps, estuaries and cliffs. The coast is marked by the presence of two large promontories situated between Calais and Boulogne: the Cap Gris-Nez (literally "grey nose cape" in English), reaching an elevation of 50 metres (160 ft) above sea level, and the Cap Blanc-Nez (literally "white nose cape" in English), which reaches 132 metres (433 ft). These capes are the closest points to England on the entire French coast.

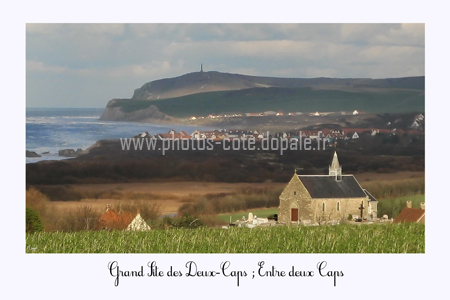

=== Cities ===
- Boulogne-sur-Mer
- Calais
- Dunkerque

=== Famous seaside resorts ===
From south to north:

- Berck
- Le Touquet-Paris-Plage
- Sainte-Cécile-Plage
- Hardelot-Plage
- Équihen-Plage
- Wimereux
- Audresselles
- Ambleteuse
- Wissant
- Blériot-Plage
- Bray-Dunes

=== Other communes of the coast ===
From south to north:

- Merlimont
- Cucq
- Saint-Étienne-au-Mont
- Le Portel
- Audinghen
- Escalles
- Sangatte
- Marck
- Oye-Plage
- Grand-Fort-Philippe
- Gravelines
- Leffrinckoucke
- Zuydcoote

== Arts ==
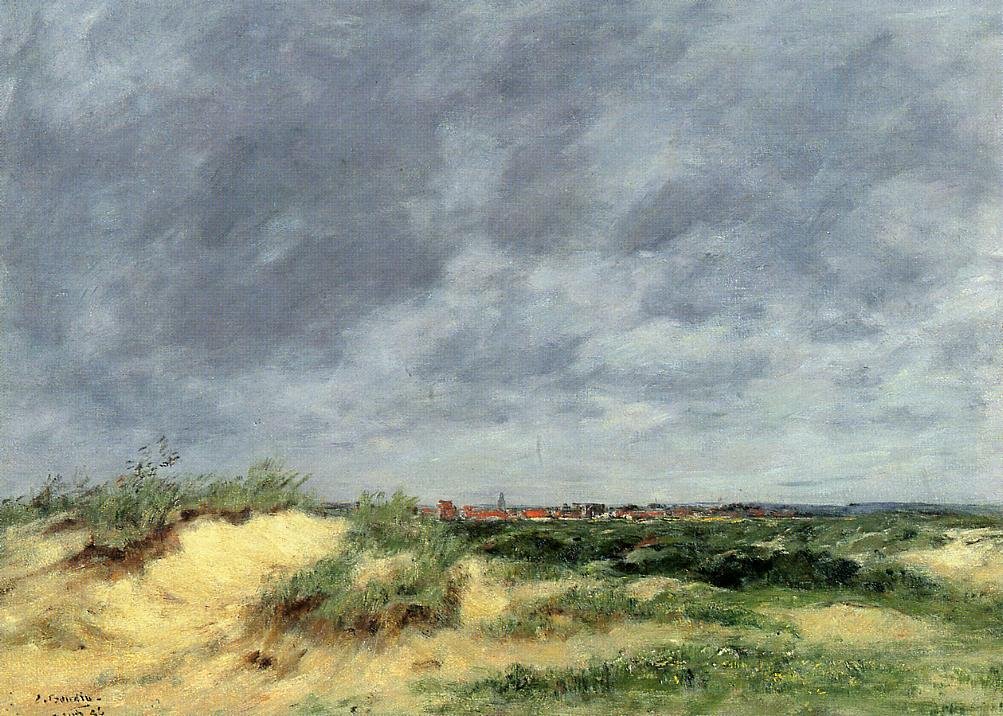
Eugène Boudin's painting of the Dunes at Berck, 1890

Many artists have been inspired by the coast's landscapes, among them the composer Henri Dutilleux, the writers Victor Hugo and Charles Dickens, and the painters J. M. W. Turner, Carolus-Duran, Maurice Boitel and Eugène Boudin. It was the painter Édouard Lévêque who coined the name for this area in 1911 to describe the distinctive quality of its light.

== See also ==
- Communauté d'agglomération du Boulonnais
- Berck-Plage - Paris-Plage line
