= Tramway à vapeur d'Ardres à Pont d'Ardres =

Ardres–Pont-d'Ardres steam tram

Overview
- Native name: Tramway à vapeur d'Ardres à Pont-d'Ardres
- Status: Closed
- Owner: Société des Tramways à vapeur d'Ardres à Pont-d'Ardres
- Locale: Ardres, Pas-de-Calais France
- Stations: 7

Service
- Operator(s): Chemin de fer d'Anvin à Calais

History
- Opened: September 1902
- Closed: 1 March 1955

Technical
- Line length: 6.10 kilometres (3.79 mi)
- Track gauge: 1,000 mm (3 ft 3 3/8 in) metre gauge

The Ardres–Pont-d'Ardres steam tram (French: Tramway à vapeur d'Ardres à Pont-d'Ardres, pronounced [tʁamwɛ a vapœʁ daʁdʁ a pɔ̃ daʁdʁ], TvAPA) was a 1,000 mm (3 ft 3 3/8 in) metre gauge tramway that ran between Ardres and Pont-d'Ardres, Pas-de-Calais, France. It opened in 1902 and closed in 1955.

== History ==
In 1899, Messrs Say's desired that their sucrerie (sugar refinery) at Pont-d'Ardres was connected by rail to the Chemin de fer d'Anvin à Calais (CF AC) at Ardres. The benefit of a rail line would be a reduction in travel time for their workers. It took them an hour and a half to travel by road between Ardres and Pont-d'Ardres. They worked twelve-hour shifts, with changeover at 07:00 and 19:00. Sugar beet was having to be transported via Calais, and was being damaged in transshipment. The line was promoted by Messrs Darras, with Say's providing 99% of the capital to build the line.

In June 1901, the line was declared to be d'utilité publique (in the public interest). The line opened in September 1902. It was worked by the CF AC from that October. In 1903, Messrs Say were granted permission to operate their metre gauge steam locomotive on the TvAPA within the confines of Pont-d'Ardres. In 1905, Messrs Darras formed the Société des Tramways à vapeur d'Ardres à Pont-d'Ardres. In 1909, an arrêt was opened at La Cense Hébron. In 1913, an 0-6-2T locomotive was borrowed from the Chemins de Fer de Milly à Formerie et de Noyon à Guiscard et Lassigny (CF MF & NGL) in the Oise department pending the arrival of a new locomotive. A bumper sugar beet harvest was forecast that year. No French manufacturer could supply a new locomotive, but Henschel could. Special permission was obtained with assistance from the CF AC to buy the locomotive. It was cleared for use of the TvAPA, CF AC and Chemins de Fer d'Aire à Fruges et de Rimeux-Gournay à Berck (CF du ARB).

During World War I, the TvAPA fell within a security zone known as the Reserved Zone. Civilians living within this zone had free travel within the Canton in which they lived. To travel beyond their or Canton, or in and out of the Reserved Zone, a sauf-conduit (identity card) was required. Services were reduced in frequency, with military and freight traffic taking priority.

In 1919, the TvAPA was acquired by the Compagnie générale de voies ferrées d'intérêt local (VFIL), along with the CF AC, CF du ARB, and Chemin de fer des Flandres in the Nord department. In 1934, CF AC autorail CGL 11 was put into service on the TvAPA. It is likely that this provided the regular passenger service until the start of World War II.

World War II broke out on 3 September, with Calais falling into German hands on 25 May 1940. The Pas-de-Calais department became a zone of special control, administered by the Oberkommando der Wehrmacht in Brussels, Belgium. Along the coast was the "red zone". It was said that French law did not apply in this zone. Under the terms of the armistice, France was to hand over its railways to the Germans undamaged and was to work with the German authorities to restore them to serviceable condition. In 1940, civilian passenger services were reduced to twice daily, although other trains would have been run for the military of conscripted personnel. In 1942, the Marine Verpflegungsamt (MVA) became responsible for running the VFIL system in Pas-de-Calais. In 1943, the MVA required the TvAPA to transport 240 tonnes of material a day in support of the construction of launch sites for V-1 flying bombs at Journy. In 1943, freight services were running twice daily, three days a week.

Post-war, passenger services on the TvAPA were reduced to twice daily on Wednesdays and Saturdays only. This was blamed on a shortage of fuel. The TvAPA closed with the CF AC on 28 February 1955.

== Description of line ==
The line shared the CF AC station at Ardres, and diverged from the CF AC 483 metres (528 yd) east of Ardres station, heading north. After crossing the N43, it ran alongside that road to Pont-d'Ardres. There were ten ungated level crossings, mostly over minor roads. At Pont-d'Ardres, the railway shared the CF du Nord station on the standard gauge main line between Lille and Calais. Messrs Say's sucrerie was between the main line and the Canal de Calais. The TvAPA crossed the main line on the level to access it.

== Stations ==
Apart from the stations shared with the CF AC and CF du Nord, there were five arrêts (halts).

Station	Distance	Elevation	Notes
Ardres	0.0 kilometres (0 mi)	13 metres (43 ft)	connection with Chemin de fer d'Anvin à Calais
Les Tilleuls	1.0 kilometre (0.6 mi)	15 metres (49 ft)	This was the only intermediate station to handle goods, and then only by the wagon load. Sugar beet would be stored here for onward transhipment to the sucrerie.
Chemin de St-Quentin	1.6 kilometres (1.0 mi)	11 metres (36 ft)	
Fauberg Gambetta	2.2 kilometres (1.4 mi)	5 metres (16 ft)	
Bois-en-Ardres	3.6 kilometres (2.2 mi)	10 metres (33 ft)	
La Cense Hébron	4.4 kilometres (2.7 mi)	5 metres (16 ft)	
Pont-d'Ardres	6.1 kilometres (3.8 mi)	3 metres (10 ft)	connection with Chemin de Fer du Nord

== Rolling stock ==
The following locomotives operated on the TvAPA.

Number	Builder	Year	Wheel arrangement	Notes
1	Corpet-Louvet	pre-1900	0-6-0T	acquired second hand
2	Corpet-Louvet	1882	0-6-0T	acquired second hand
3	SLM	1 889	0-6-0T	ex Réseau tramway de Genève; to Messrs Say, 1912
3	Henschel	1912	0-6-0T	to Messrs Say, unknown date

There were two 4-wheeled composite carriages, seating 6 first and 20 second class passengers, and a bogie second, which seated 56. Freight stock consisted of two vans and 22 open wagons.
