= Boulogne-Ville station =

Railway station in France

Coordinates: 50°42′56″N 1°36′36″E

Boulogne-Ville
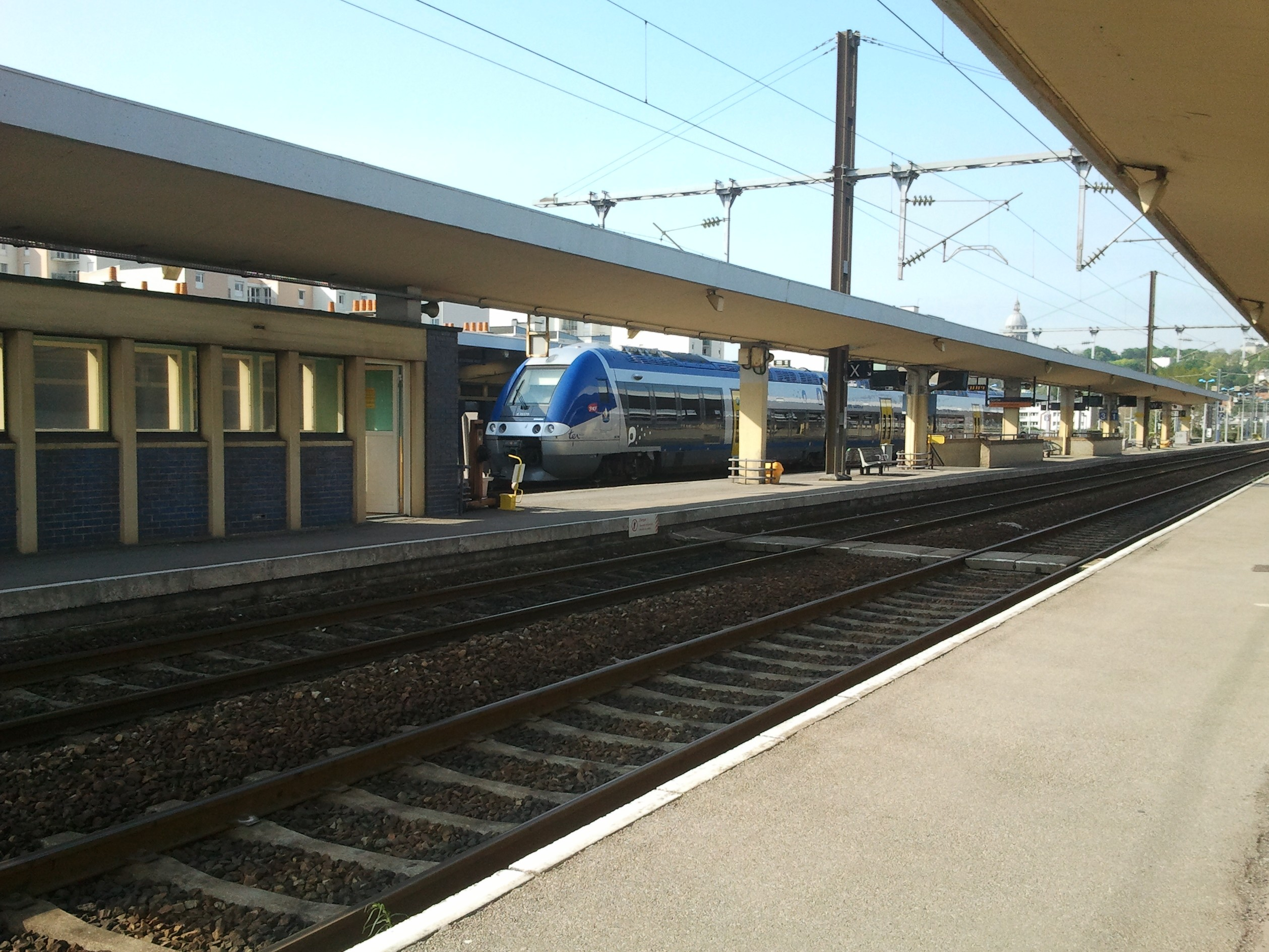
- Boulogne-Ville station

General information
- Lines: Boulogne–Calais railway Longueau–Boulogne railway

Other information
- Station code: 87317586

History
- Opened: 1850s (original site); 1962 (new site)

Passengers
- 2024: 1,046,427

Services
Preceding station	TER Hauts-de-France	Following station
Calais-Fréthun towards Amiens	Krono+ GV K94+	Étaples–Le Touquet towards Rang-du-Fliers
Étaples–Le Touquet towards Paris-Nord	Krono K16	Calais Terminus
Étaples–Le Touquet towards Amiens	Krono K21	Boulogne-Tintelleries towards Calais
Pont-de-Briques towards Rang-du-Fliers	Proxi P73	Terminus

Other services
	Disused railways	
Terminus	Boulogne–Bonningues-lès-Ardres; Metre gauge	Abbatoir
Location

Boulogne-Ville is one of the railway stations serving the town Boulogne-sur-Mer, Pas-de-Calais department, northern France. The other station is Boulogne-Tintelleries.

== History ==
The railway reached Boulogne in 1848. Passengers had to use a goods terminal until Boulogne-Ville was built in the 1850s. The building was of red and yellow bricks on a stone base, with red, yellow and white mortar. On 12 May 1902, the Chemin de fer de Boulogne à Bonningues (CF de BB) extended its line from Saint-Martin-Boulogne to the Quai Chanzy, outside Boulogne-Ville station. The CF de BB closed on 31 December 1935, apart from a freight service at the Bonningues-lès-Ardres end of the line. The station was destroyed during World War II. Boulogne-Ville station was rebuilt in 1962–63 on a new site, on the opposite bank of the Liane.

== Services ==
The station is situated on the Longueau-Boulogne railway, and is served by local TER Hauts-de-France services from Boulogne to Lille-Flandres, Calais to Amiens and between Boulogne and Dunkerque. There is also a TGV service to Lille-Europe via Calais-Fréthun which takes 55 minutes.
