= Fruges =

Fruges Frusje
- Commune
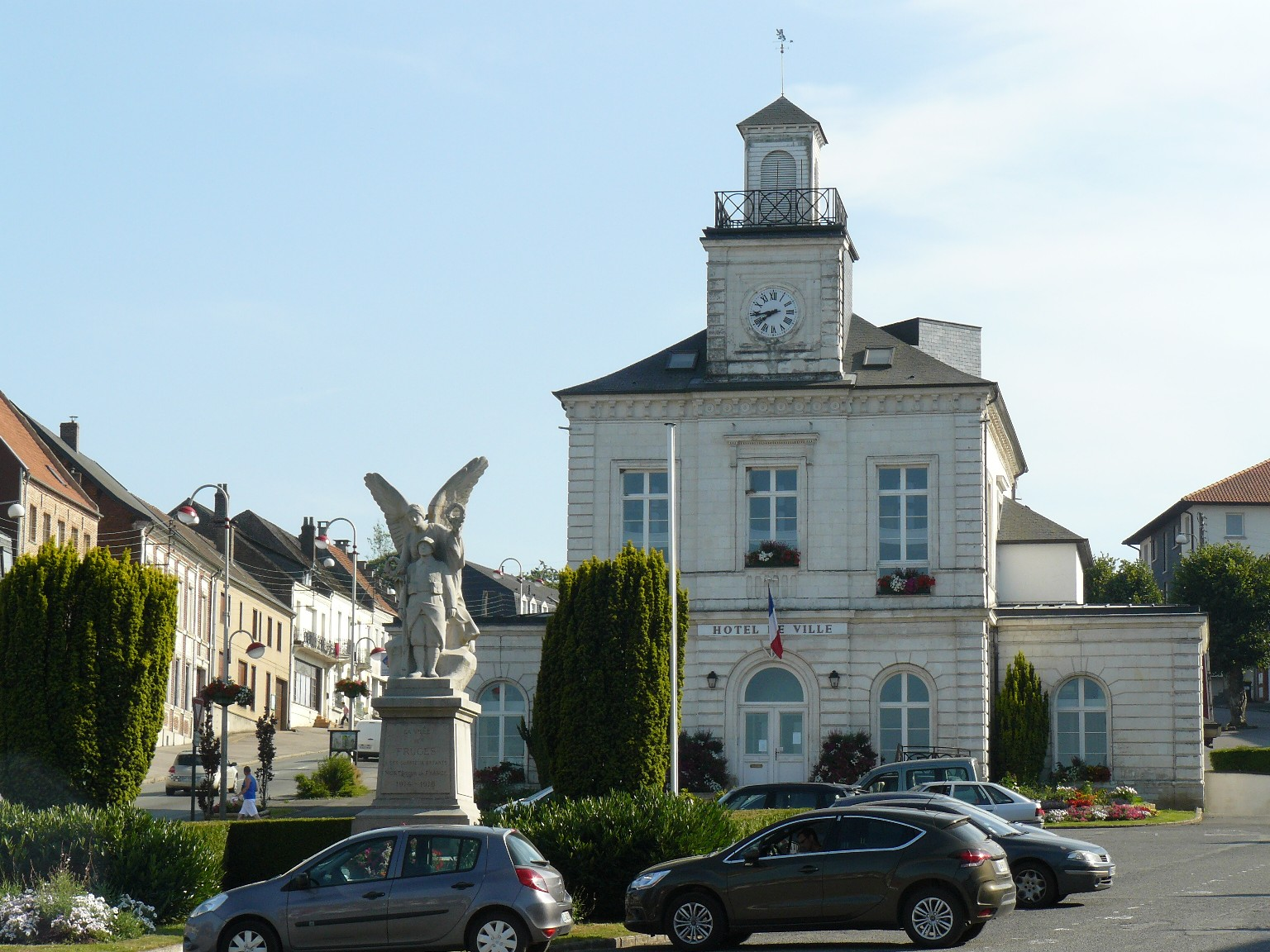
- The town hall of Fruges

- Coat of arms
- Location of Fruges
- Location within France Location within Hauts-de-France
- Coordinates: 50°30′55″N 2°08′04″E
- Country: France
- Region: Hauts-de-France
- Department: Pas-de-Calais
- Arrondissement: Montreuil
- Canton: Fruges
- Intercommunality: CC Haut Pays du Montreuillois

Government
  - Mayor (2020–2026): Edmond Zaborowski
- Area^{1}: 18.9 km^{2} (7.3 sq mi)
- Elevation: 107 m (351 ft)
- Highest elevation: 171 m (561 ft)
- Lowest elevation: 84 m (276 ft)
- Population (2023): 2,362
  - Density: 125/km^{2} (324/sq mi)
- Time zone: UTC+01:00 (CET)
  - Summer (DST): UTC+02:00 (CEST)
- INSEE/Postal code: 62364 /62310
- ^{1} French Land Register data, which excludes lakes, ponds, glaciers > 1 km^{2} (0.386 sq mi or 247 acres) and river estuaries.

Fruges (French pronunciation: [fʁyʒ]; West Flemish: Frusje; Picard: Fruches) is a commune in the Pas-de-Calais department in the Hauts-de-France region of France.

== Geography ==
Situated some 12 miles (19 km) northeast of Montreuil-sur-Mer on the D928 road, set in a valley not far from the historic battlefield of Azincourt.

== Features ==
Fruges is a typical small country town in the Pas-de-Calais with a weekly market, agricultural suppliers, a Carrefour and various smaller stores.

An annual Fête des Géants livens up August with parades of marching bands and papier mache giants.

== Population ==
Historical population
Year	Pop.	±% p.a.
1968	2,460	—
1975	2,534	+0.42%
1982	2,465	−0.39%
1990	2,499	+0.17%
1999	2,426	−0.33%
2007	2,533	+0.54%
2012	2,460	−0.58%
2017	2,371	−0.73%
2023	2,362	−0.06%
Source: INSEE

== Places of interest ==
- Church of St. Bertulphe, dating from the nineteenth century.

== Twin towns ==
Fruges is twinned with Olsberg, Germany, since 1965.

== Transport ==
The Chemin de fer d'Anvin à Calais opened a railway station at Fruges in 1881. From 1891, the station was also served by the Chemins de fer d'Aire à Fruges et de Rimeux-Gournay à Berck. The railways were closed in 1955.

== See also ==
- Communes of the Pas-de-Calais department
