= Montreuil-sur-Mer station =

Railway station in Montreuil, France

Montreuil-sur-Mer
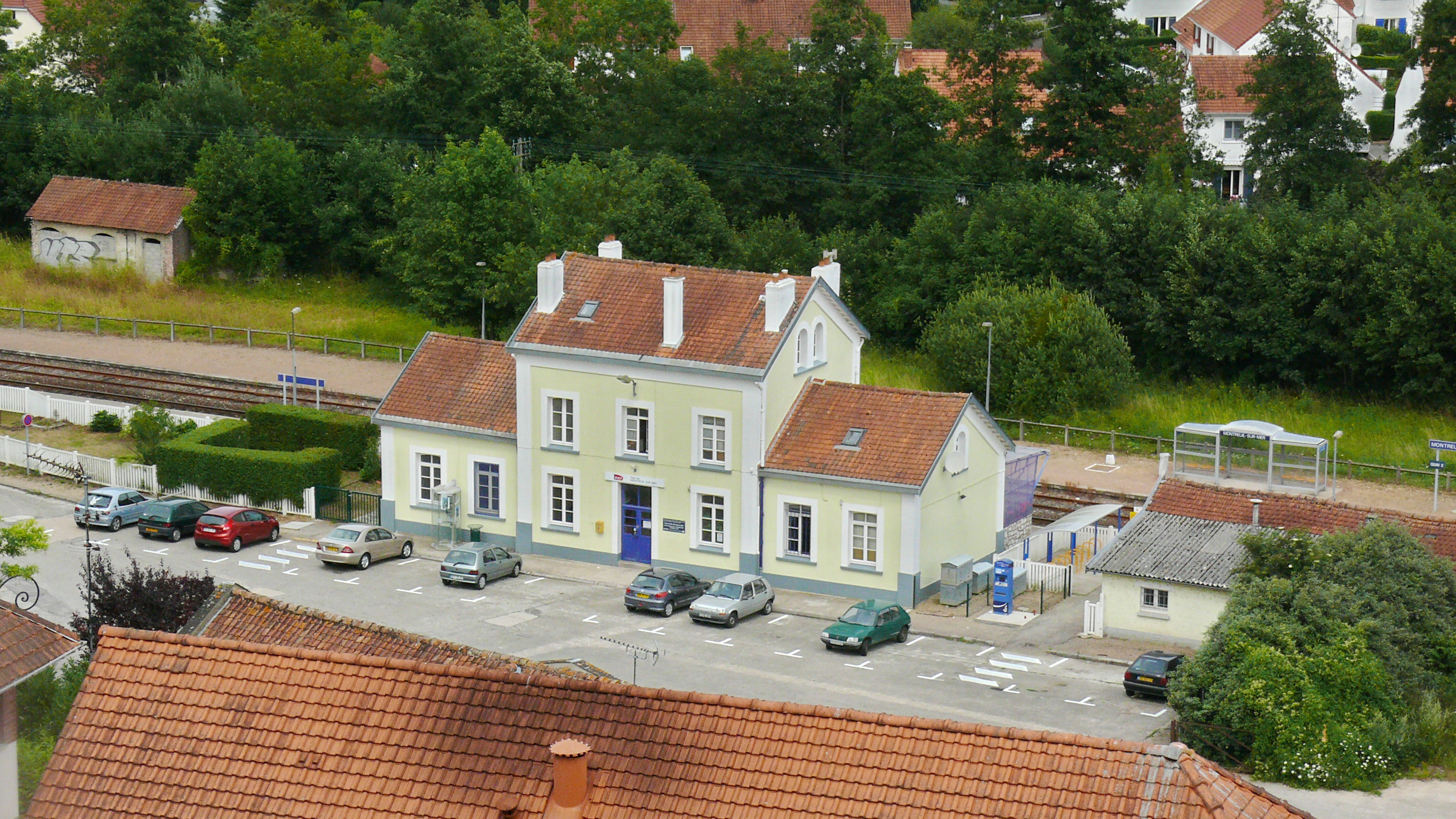

General information
- Location: Avenue de la Gare; 62170 Montreuil-sur-Mer
- Coordinates: 50°27′58″N 1°46′8″E
- Owner: RFF/SNCF
- Line: Saint-Pol-sur-Ternoise–Étaples railway
- Platforms: 2
- Tracks: 2

Other information
- Station code: 87317164

Services
Preceding station	TER Hauts-de-France	Following station
Étaples–Le Touquet towards Étaples-Le Touquet	Proxi P53	Brimeux towards Arras
Location

Montreuil-sur-Mer is a railway station on the line from Arras to Étaples via Saint-Pol-sur-Ternoise. It is located in the commune of Montreuil-sur-Mer in the Pas-de-Calais department, France. The station is served by TER Hauts-de-France trains between Étaples-Le Touquet and Arras via Saint-Pol-sur-Ternoise.

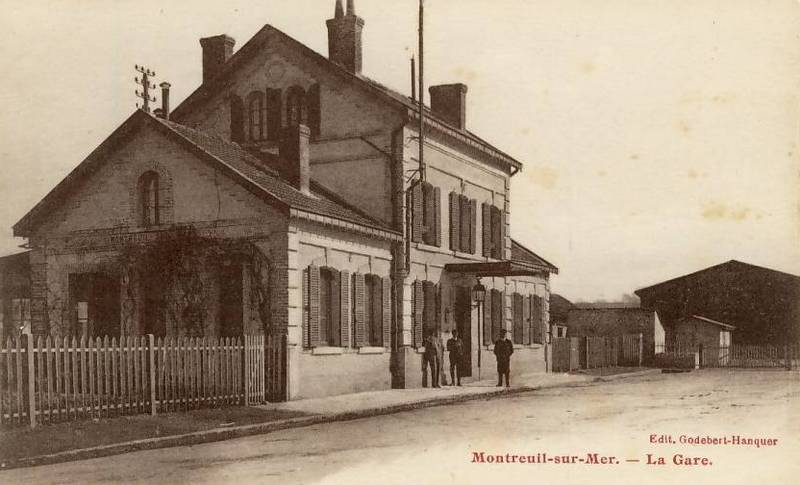
The station in the early 20th century, shared by the Arras-Étaples line and the Chemins de fer d'Aire à Fruges et de Rimeux-Gournay à Berck.

== See also ==
- List of SNCF stations in Hauts-de-France
