= Étaples–Le Touquet station =

Railway station in Étaples, France

Coordinates: 50°31′02″N 1°38′32″E

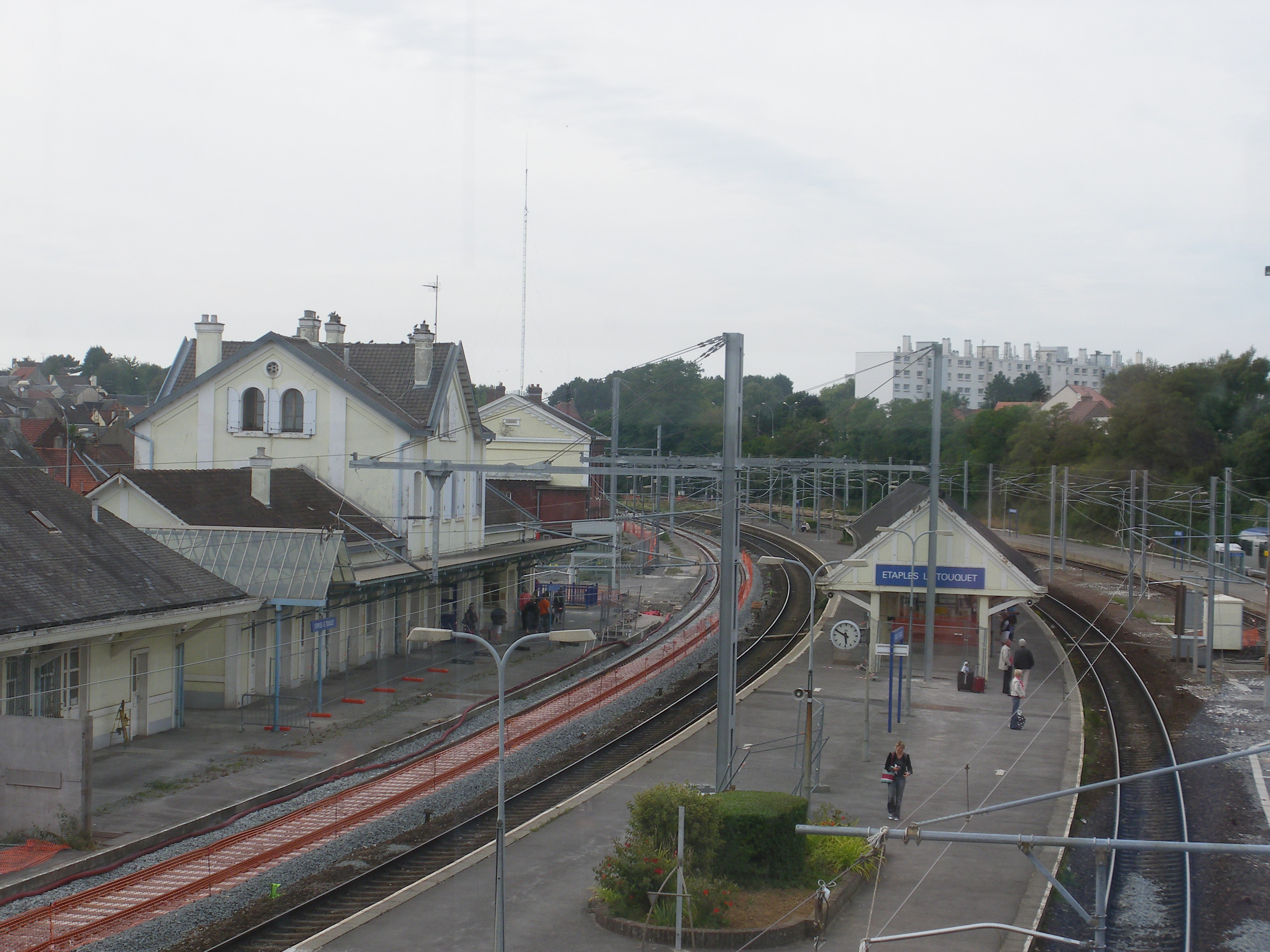
Étaples-Le Touquet station

Étaples-Le Touquet is a railway station serving the towns Étaples and Le Touquet, both in the Pas-de-Calais department, northern France. The station is located in the centre of Étaples.

== Services ==
The station is served by TER Hauts-de-France services between Boulogne and Amiens. It also sees a TGV service to Lille-Europe via Calais-Fréthun.

Preceding station	TER Hauts-de-France	Following station
Boulogne towards Amiens	Krono+ GV K94+	Rang-du-Fliers Terminus
Rang-du-Fliers towards Paris-Nord	Krono K16	Boulogne towards Calais
Rang-du-Fliers towards Amiens	Krono K21	Boulogne towards Calais
Terminus	Proxi P53	Montreuil-sur-Mer towards Arras
Rang-du-Fliers Terminus	Proxi P73	Dannes-Camiers towards Calais

	Disused railways	
Saint-Josse; Towards Amiens. Line open, station closed	Longueau–Boulogne railway	Dannes-Camiers; Towards Boulogne. Line and station open
Terminus	Tramway d'Étaples à Paris-Plage	Étaples market Toward Paris-Plage; Line and station closed
