= Rang-du-Fliers =

- Commune
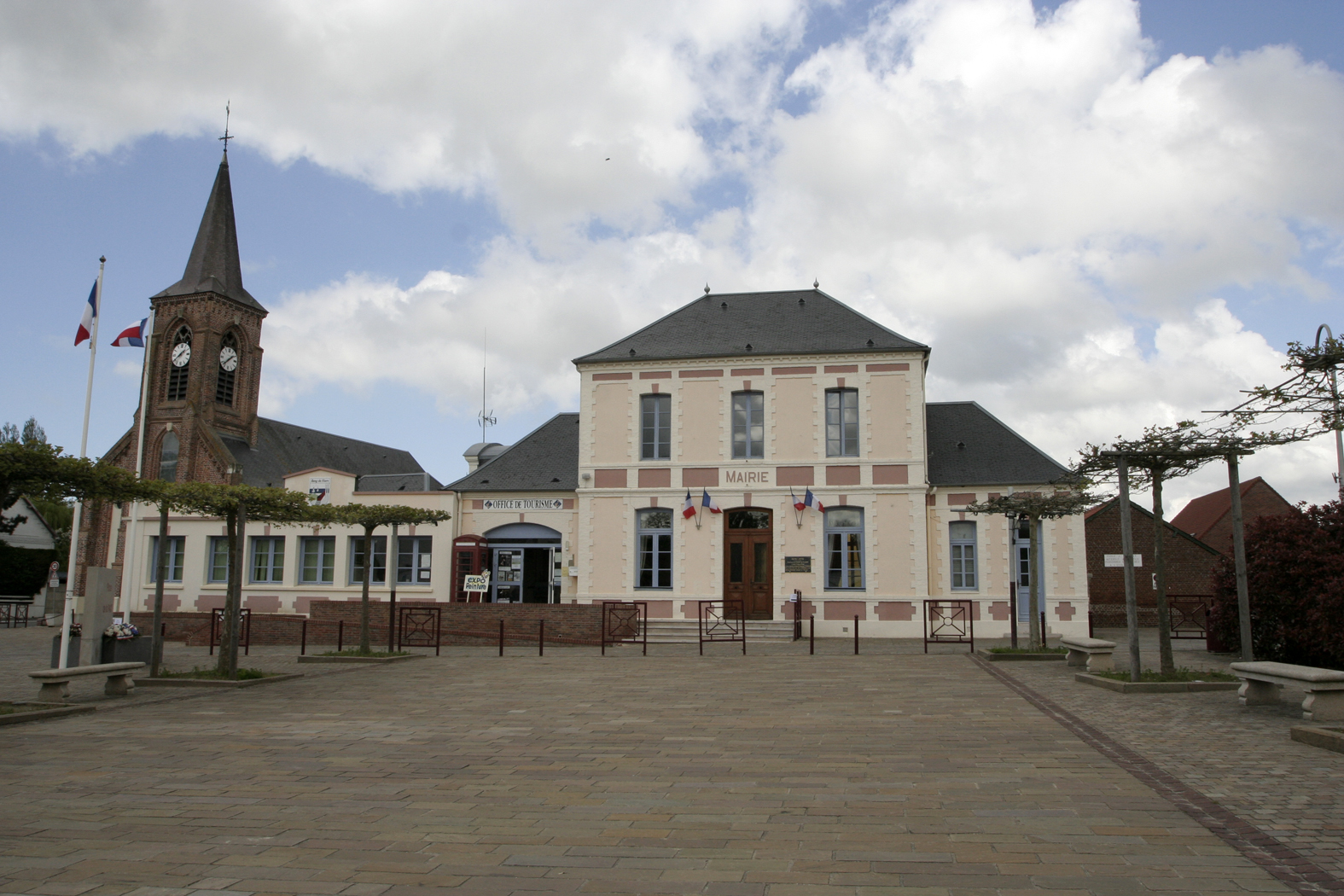
- The town hall and church of Rang-du-Fliers
- Location of Rang-du-Fliers
- Location within France Location within Hauts-de-France
- Coordinates: 50°25′06″N 1°38′26″E
- Country: France
- Region: Hauts-de-France
- Department: Pas-de-Calais
- Arrondissement: Montreuil
- Canton: Berck
- Intercommunality: CA Deux Baies en Montreuillois

Government
  - Mayor (2020–2026): Claude Coin
- Area^{1}: 10.47 km^{2} (4.04 sq mi)
- Elevation: 11 m (36 ft)
- Highest elevation: 48 m (157 ft)
- Lowest elevation: 3 m (9.8 ft)
- Population (2023): 4,297
  - Density: 410.4/km^{2} (1,063/sq mi)
- Time zone: UTC+01:00 (CET)
  - Summer (DST): UTC+02:00 (CEST)
- INSEE/Postal code: 62688 /62180
- ^{1} French Land Register data, which excludes lakes, ponds, glaciers > 1 km^{2} (0.386 sq mi or 247 acres) and river estuaries.

Rang-du-Fliers (French pronunciation: [ʁɑ̃ dy flije]) is a commune in the Pas-de-Calais department in the Hauts-de-France region of France 5 miles (8 km) southeast of Montreuil-sur-Mer.

== History ==
Rang-du-Fliers became a commune in 1870, having been previously only a hamlet of Verton.

== Population ==
Historical population
Year	Pop.	±% p.a.
1968	2,224	—
1975	2,789	+3.29%
1982	3,297	+2.42%
1990	3,579	+1.03%
1999	3,612	+0.10%
2007	4,022	+1.35%
2012	4,125	+0.51%
2017	4,171	+0.22%
2023	4,297	+0.50%
Source: INSEE

== Notable people ==
- Micheline Ostermeyer, Olympic champion athlete and pianist, was born here.

== Twin towns ==
- Ditton, United Kingdom

== See also ==
- Communes of the Pas-de-Calais department
