= Longueau–Boulogne railway =

French railway

Coordinates: 49.8643°N 2.3521°E

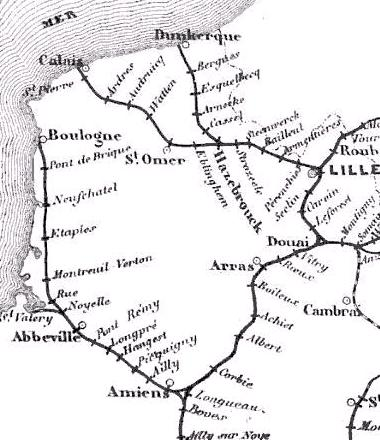
- Northern France railway network in 1853

Overview
- Status: Operational
- Owner: RFF
- Locale: France (Hauts-de-France)
- Termini: Gare de Longueau; Gare de Boulogne-Ville

Service
- System: SNCF
- Operator(s): SNCF

History
- Opened: 1847 to 1848

Technical
- Line length: 171 kilometres (106 mi)
- Number of tracks: Double track
- Track gauge: 1,435 mm (4 ft 8 1/2 in) standard gauge

The Longueau–Boulogne railway is a French railway which runs from a junction with the Paris-Lille railway at Longueau to the coastal port of Boulogne. A double track railway it is 171 kilometres (106 miles) long. Until the start of the Eurostar service from London to Paris in 1994 via LGV Nord it was the main route for the boat trains to Paris which met the ships carrying passengers from Great Britain. As of August 2011 the line is used by Intercités services from Paris to Boulogne, TGV services from Rang-du-Fliers via Calais-Fréthun to Lille-Europe and local TER Hauts-de-France services.

The line was built by Compagnie des chemins de fer du Nord during 1847 and 1848. The section from Longueau through Amiens and to the junction with the line to Rouen is electrified at 25 kV 50 Hz. From 2009 to 2010 the line from Boulogne to Rang-du-Fliers was also electrified to allow a TER-GV service to run.
