= Cucq =

Cucq Kuuk
- Commune
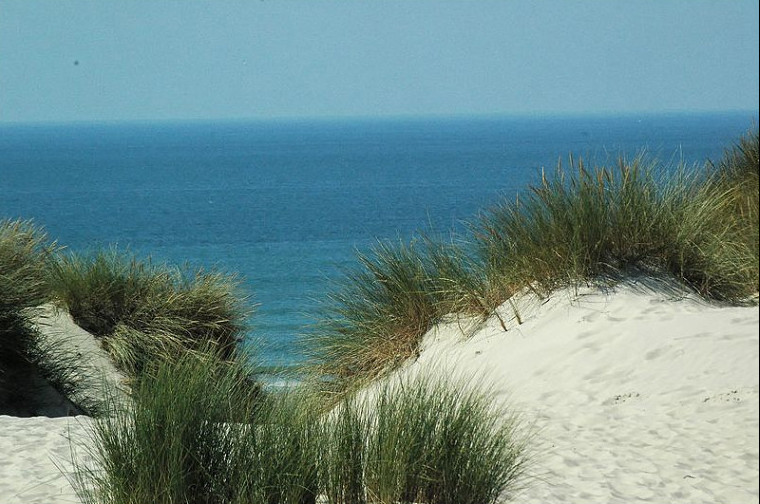
- Beach at Stella from the dunes

- Coat of arms
- Location of Cucq
- Location within France Location within Hauts-de-France
- Coordinates: 50°28′39″N 1°37′10″E
- Country: France
- Region: Hauts-de-France
- Department: Pas-de-Calais
- Arrondissement: Montreuil
- Canton: Étaples
- Intercommunality: CA Deux Baies en Montreuillois

Government
  - Mayor (2020–2026): Walter Kahn
- Area^{1}: 13.16 km^{2} (5.08 sq mi)
- Elevation: 5 m (16 ft)
- Highest elevation: 45 m (148 ft)
- Lowest elevation: 3 m (9.8 ft)
- Population (2023): 5,129
  - Density: 389.7/km^{2} (1,009/sq mi)
- Time zone: UTC+01:00 (CET)
  - Summer (DST): UTC+02:00 (CEST)
- INSEE/Postal code: 62261 /62780
- ^{1} French Land Register data, which excludes lakes, ponds, glaciers > 1 km^{2} (0.386 sq mi or 247 acres) and river estuaries.

Cucq (French pronunciation: [kyk]; unofficially also: Cucq-Trépied-Stella-Plage; West Flemish: Kuuk) is a commune in the Pas-de-Calais department in the Hauts-de-France region of France. It is made up of three villages: Cucq itself, the village of Trépied in the north and the coastal resort of Stella-Plage to the west.

== History ==
In 1937 the government sold 1600 hectares of the warrens of Trépied, land of the former domain of the Abbey of St. Josse that was confiscated at the time of the French Revolution, to Jean-Baptiste Daloz. Most of this area became better-known later as Le Touquet, a separate commune, in 1912.

== Population ==
Historical population
Year	Pop.	±% p.a.
1968	3,883	—
1975	4,154	+0.97%
1982	4,373	+0.74%
1990	4,299	−0.21%
1999	4,912	+1.49%
2007	5,195	+0.70%
2012	5,132	−0.24%
2017	5,121	−0.04%
2023	5,129	+0.03%
Source: INSEE

== Notable people ==
- Matthieu Bataille, judo champion
- Pauline Parmentier, tennis player
- Michael Curtis "Yogi" Stewart, basketball player
- Pauline Crammer, football player
- Ophélie David, skier

== See also ==
- Communes of the Pas-de-Calais department
