= Verton =

- Commune
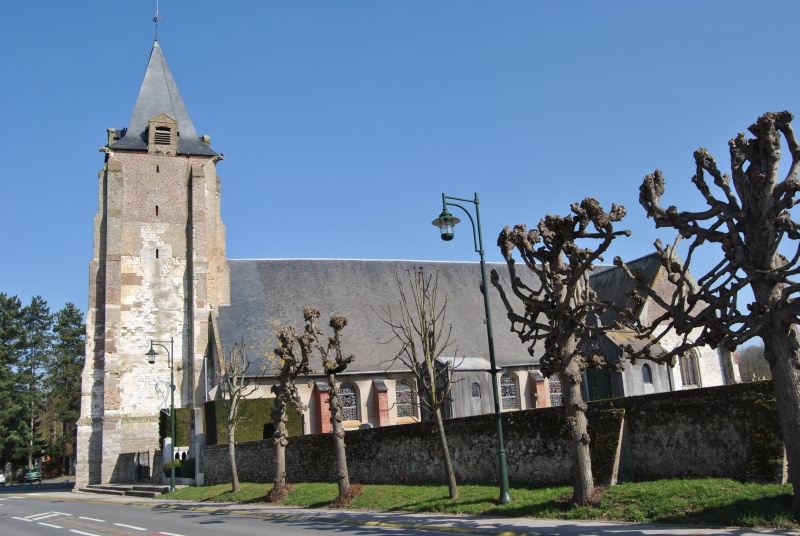
- The St. Michel Church in Verton

- Coat of arms
- Location of Verton
- Location within France Location within Hauts-de-France
- Coordinates: 50°24′10″N 1°39′00″E
- Country: France
- Region: Hauts-de-France
- Department: Pas-de-Calais
- Arrondissement: Montreuil
- Canton: Berck
- Intercommunality: CA Deux Baies en Montreuillois

Government
  - Mayor (2020–2026): Joël Lemaire
- Area^{1}: 11.06 km^{2} (4.27 sq mi)
- Elevation: 12 m (39 ft)
- Highest elevation: 53 m (174 ft)
- Lowest elevation: 2 m (6.6 ft)
- Population (2023): 2,571
  - Density: 232.5/km^{2} (602.1/sq mi)
- Time zone: UTC+01:00 (CET)
  - Summer (DST): UTC+02:00 (CEST)
- INSEE/Postal code: 62849 /62180
- ^{1} French Land Register data, which excludes lakes, ponds, glaciers > 1 km^{2} (0.386 sq mi or 247 acres) and river estuaries.

Verton (French pronunciation: [vɛʁtɔ̃]) is a commune in the Pas-de-Calais department in the Hauts-de-France region of France 6 miles (9 km) southwest of Montreuil-sur-Mer and 3 miles (5 km) from the coast, near the estuary of the Authie.

== Population ==
Historical population
Year	Pop.	±% p.a.
1968	746	—
1975	954	+3.58%
1982	1,570	+7.38%
1990	1,947	+2.73%
1999	2,123	+0.97%
2007	2,272	+0.85%
2012	2,257	−0.13%
2017	2,425	+1.45%
2023	2,571	+0.98%
Source: INSEE

== See also ==
- Communes of the Pas-de-Calais department
