= Déclaration d'utilité publique =

French law declaration of public benefit

A déclaration d'utilité publique (French pronunciation: [deklaʁasjɔ̃ dytilite pyblik]), or declaration of public utility, is a formal recognition in French law that a proposed project has public benefits. The declaration must be obtained for many large construction projects in France or its old colonies, especially for infrastructure, before work can begin.

== Process ==
The first part of the declaration is a public inquiry, usually started by a prefect, to collect the views of all affected parties. Responses from affected parties are considered by a commissioner, who assesses whether the proposal has an overall benefit for the public.

If the finding is favourable, the declaration is granted by decree.

== Legal basis ==
The déclaration d'utilité publique was initially required by article 545 of the Civil Code, which stipulates that property cannot be confiscated except for public purposes and with fair compensation.

== Criticism ==
The public inquiry, when it enables informed debate, is considered one of the means of participatory democracy.

But one of the main criticisms levelled at the DUP (Declaration of Public Utility) procedure is that it comes at the end of the process, often when the decision is considered to have already been taken. Opponents of projects have accused prefectures of "salami-slicing" investigations, preventing a global vision of the project, or even providing misleading data.

== See also ==
- Eminent domain
