= Boulogne station =

Boulogne station may refer to:

- Boulogne–Jean Jaurès station, a Paris Metro station in Boulogne-Billancourt, Île-de-France, France
- Boulogne-Maritime station, a former railway station and port in Boulogne-sur-Mer, France
- Boulogne–Pont de Saint-Cloud station, a Paris Metro station in Boulogne-Billancourt, Île-de-France, France
- Boulogne-Tintelleries station, a railway station in the historic centre of Boulogne-sur-Mer, Pas-de-Calais, France
- Boulogne-Ville station, a railway station in Boulogne-sur-Mer, Pas-de-Calais, France

== See also ==
- Avenue Foch station, a commuter rail station in Paris, France, originally called Avenue du Bois de Boulogne
- Bois-de-Boulogne station, a commuter rail station in Montreal, Quebec, Canada
