= Basilica of Notre-Dame, Boulogne =

Basilica in Boulogne-sur-Mer, France

Basilica of Notre-Dame, Boulogne Basilique Notre-Dame de l'Immaculée Conception
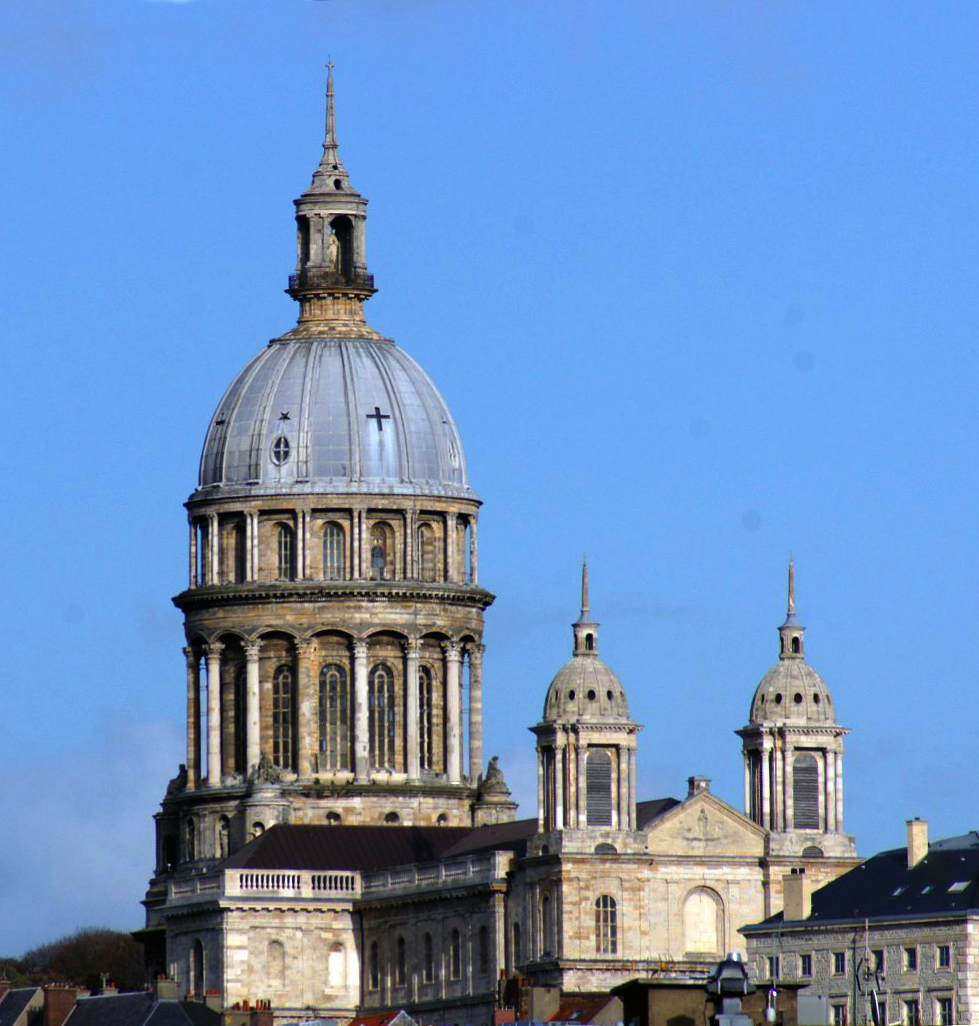
- Basilica of Notre-Dame

Religion
- Affiliation: Catholic
- Diocese: Diocese of Arras
- Ecclesiastical or organisational status: Minor basilica

Location
- Location: Boulogne-sur-Mer, Pas-de-Calais, France
- Interactive map of Basilica of Notre-Dame, Boulogne; Basilique Notre-Dame de l'Immaculée Conception
- Coordinates: 50°43′34″N 1°36′54″E

Architecture
- Type: Church
- Style: Classical

The Basilica of Notre-Dame, Boulogne, otherwise the Basilica of Our Lady of the Immaculate Conception (French: Basilique Notre-Dame de Boulogne; Basilique Notre-Dame-de-l'Immaculée-Conception), is a minor basilica located in Boulogne-sur-Mer in the Pas-de-Calais département of northern France. The basilica, a prominent landmark of the city with its 101 metres (331 ft) high dome, was built between 1827 and 1875 on the site of the medieval cathedral of Boulogne: the basilica is still known locally as the "cathedral", although the present church has never had that status.

== History of the site ==
The site of modern Boulogne was occupied by the Romans and was used by the Emperor Claudius as his base for the Roman invasion of Britain. By the 4th century, the town, known as Bononia, was a major port of the empire.

The first Christian building on the site was probably built by the Romans during the 4th or 5th century, on the peak of the hill that forms the modern haute ville, and a miraculous statue was accredited to the church in the seventh century.

In around 1100 a new church was built on the site and over the next few centuries underwent numerous changes, such as the addition of a choir in the 14th century. In 1308 it was the location of the wedding of Edward II of England to Isabella of France, an event commemorated by a memorial in the crypt.

=== Miraculous Statue ===
According to legend, in about 633, while Saint Audomare (Saint Omer) was bishop of Thérouanne, an unmanned boat carrying a luminous statue of the Virgin Mary was sighted in the estuary at Boulogne. The statue was carried to the church and soon miracles were reported at the site. Between the 13th and 16th centuries the miraculous statue, Our Lady of Boulogne (also "Our Lady of the Sea"), became a popular object of pilgrimage, bringing prosperity to the town.

In 1793, the statue was burned in the French Revolution with only a small portion of the hand surviving. This is still on display in the church; pilgrimages to visit the relic continued into the twentieth century.

On the final Monday of August, since 1854, a modern replica of the statue has been paraded around the city. The statue wears a soleil, a resplendent headdress that is worn by the townswomen during the parade.

== Boulogne Cathedral ==
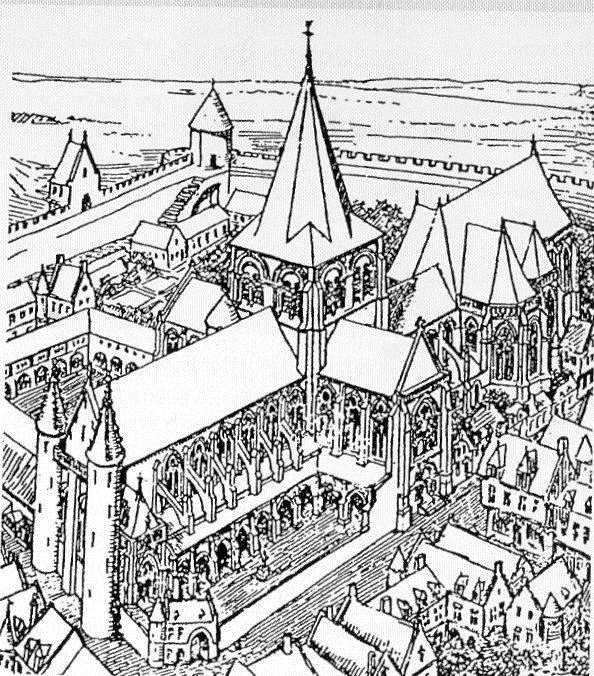
Reconstruction of the old cathedral c. 1570 (drawing by Camille Enlart)

In 1567, on the creation of the Diocese of Boulogne, the church was elevated to be its cathedral, and flourished until the French Revolution, when the Civil Constitution of the Clergy of 1790 brought it under government control. Worship in the cathedral was prohibited: the Convent of the Annonciades (Order of the Annunciation of the Blessed Virgin Mary) became the centre of worship in Boulogne, and after a period as a military warehouse, the cathedral was sold to traders from outside the city. The building was then demolished in stages, with the statue burned in 1793.

Of the original cathedral, only the impressive Romanesque crypt from the medieval building survives.

== Reconstruction ==
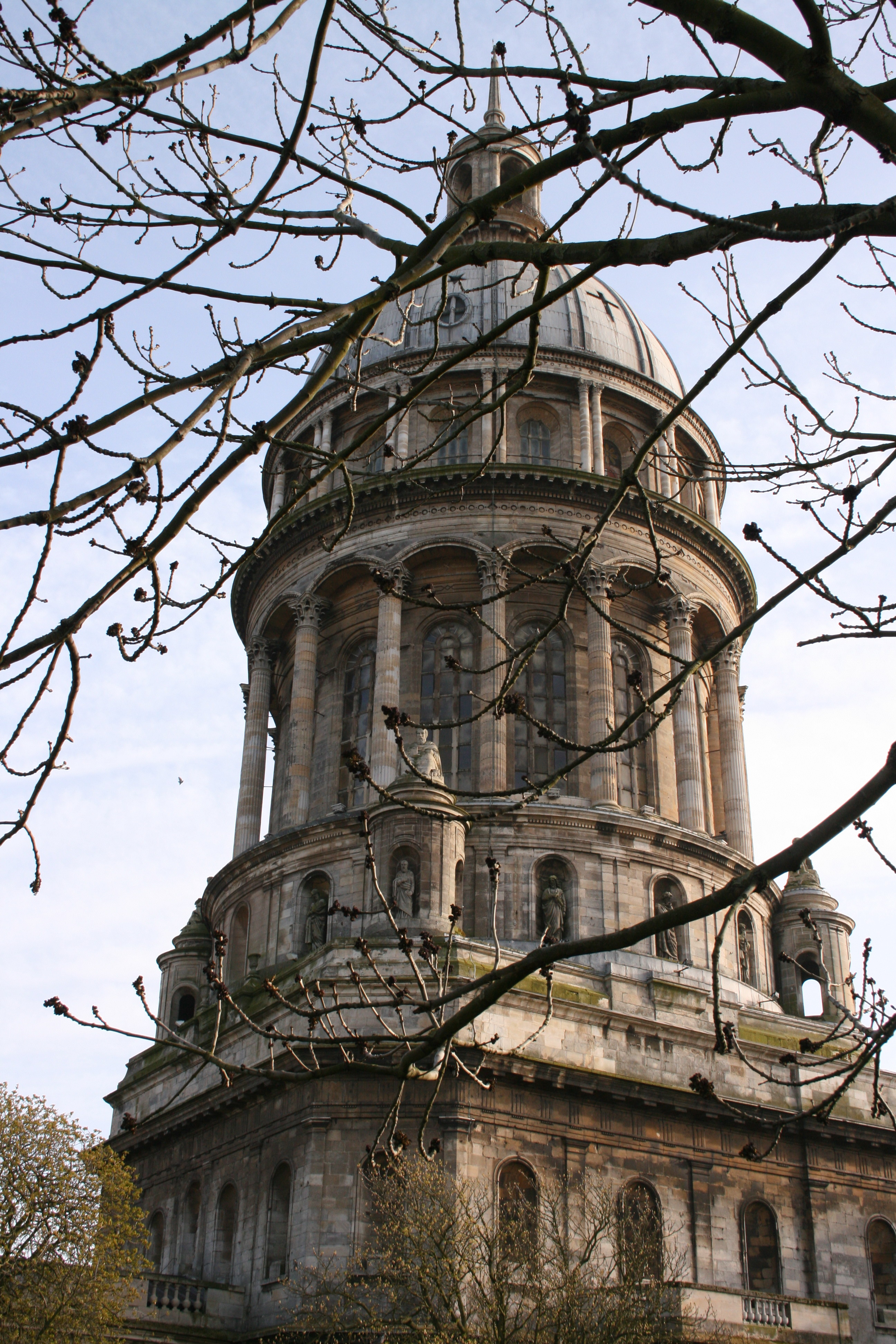
The tower and dome

Under the Concordat of 1801, which restored a reformed diocesan structure in France, the diocese of Boulogne ceased to exist. Its former territory was incorporated into the expanded Diocese of Arras.

A local priest and self-taught architect, Benoît Haffreingue, vowed to rebuild the destroyed cathedral to restore the honour of Our Lady of the Sea and return the episcopal seat to the city. After a vigorous campaign he was able to gain the support of many, including Victor Hugo and François-René de Chateaubriand, and soon had considerable public opinion behind him.

Construction of his design began in 1827 with the building of the rotunda and continued for nearly fifty years. The dome that now dominates the town was finished in 1854 and its western towers were completed in the 1870s. However, despite the support that Haffreingue's campaign gathered, the bishop's seat was not returned to Boulogne and the building thus never regained its status as a cathedral. In 1879 the rebuilt church was declared a minor basilica.

== The building ==
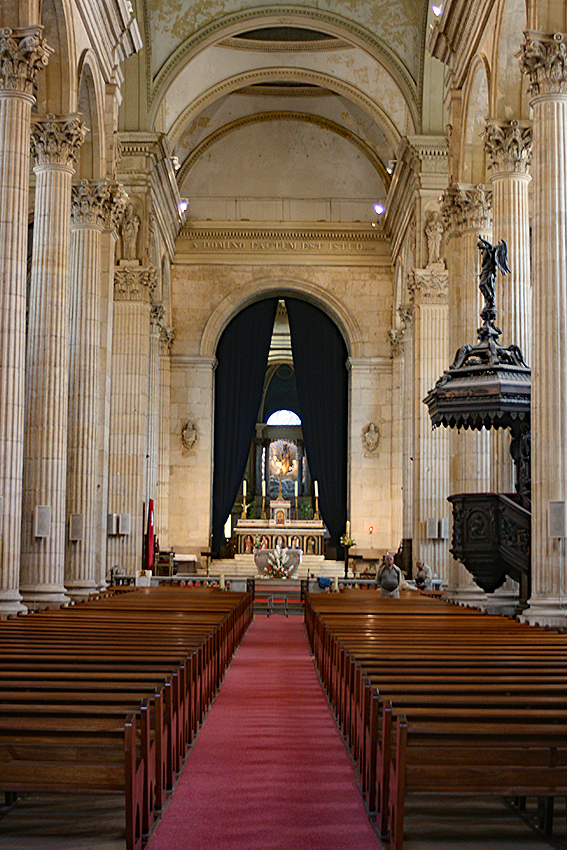
Interior of nave

Notre-Dame was built to a new design inspired by both Classical and Renaissance styles, and bears many similarities to St Paul's Cathedral. The area beneath the dome was initially designed to form the complete church, but additional funding allowed the expansion to the nave and transept that form a Latin cross. This gives the finished building the unusual internal appearance of being formed by two distinct churches, each of which is equally beautiful.

The tall nave is dominated by its rows of slender Corinthian columns, with unusual features scattered throughout. Haffreingue's lack of professional training unfortunately gave the building an inherent fragility that led to the collapse of the nave's arches in 1921. During their reconstruction the whole building was reinforced with concrete, which without doubt allowed it to survive the bombing received by the city during World War II.

== The crypt ==
When Haffreingue began work on the new church in 1827, the workmen discovered a crypt that had lain unknown for centuries, having probably been filled in during the 1544 siege of Boulogne by Henry VIII of England. The crypt is 128 metres long in total, and is believed to be the longest in France. Its Romanesque columns date back to the 11th century.

With 19th-century masonry accompanying the original medieval work, the many rooms also include the foundations of a Roman temple dedicated to Mars. Cannonballs from the siege of 1544 lie alongside offerings from the site's many medieval pilgrims.

The crypt includes a chapel in which the body of José de San Martín, the South American liberator, was buried between his death in 1850 and its return to Buenos Aires in 1861.

== Sources ==
- Official guide literature of Notre-Dame de Boulogne
