= Auguste Delacroix =

French marine painter

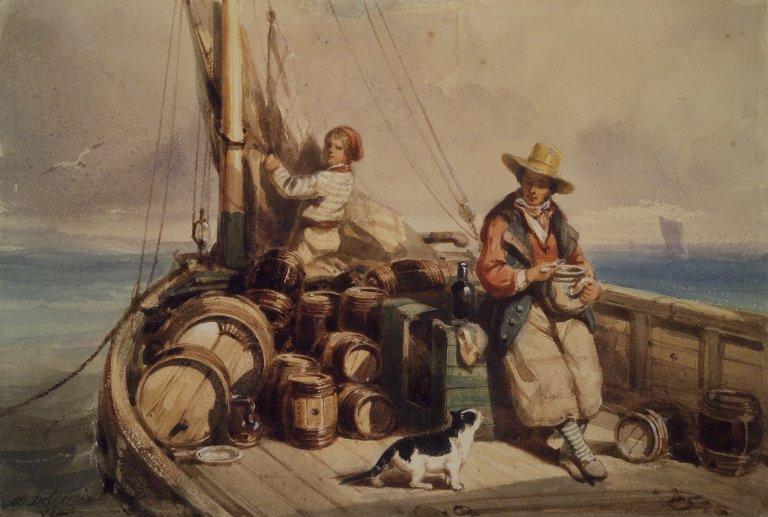
Two Figures on a Boat, watercolour, ca. 1843, now at the Brooklyn Museum

Auguste Delacroix, a French marine painter, was born on 27 January 1809 at Boulogne, and died there in 1868. He produced some elegant sea-pieces taken on the French and North African coasts, and also painted some African genre pictures.

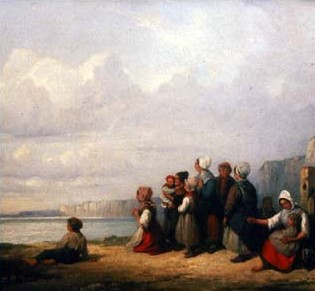
Waiting for the Fishermen, 1834
