= Benoît Haffreingue =

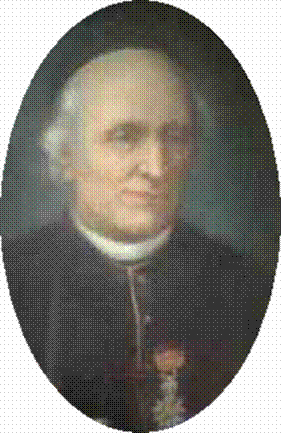
Benoit Agathon Haffreingue

Benoît-Agathon Haffreingue (1785 – 1871) was a French priest based in Boulogne-sur-Mer.

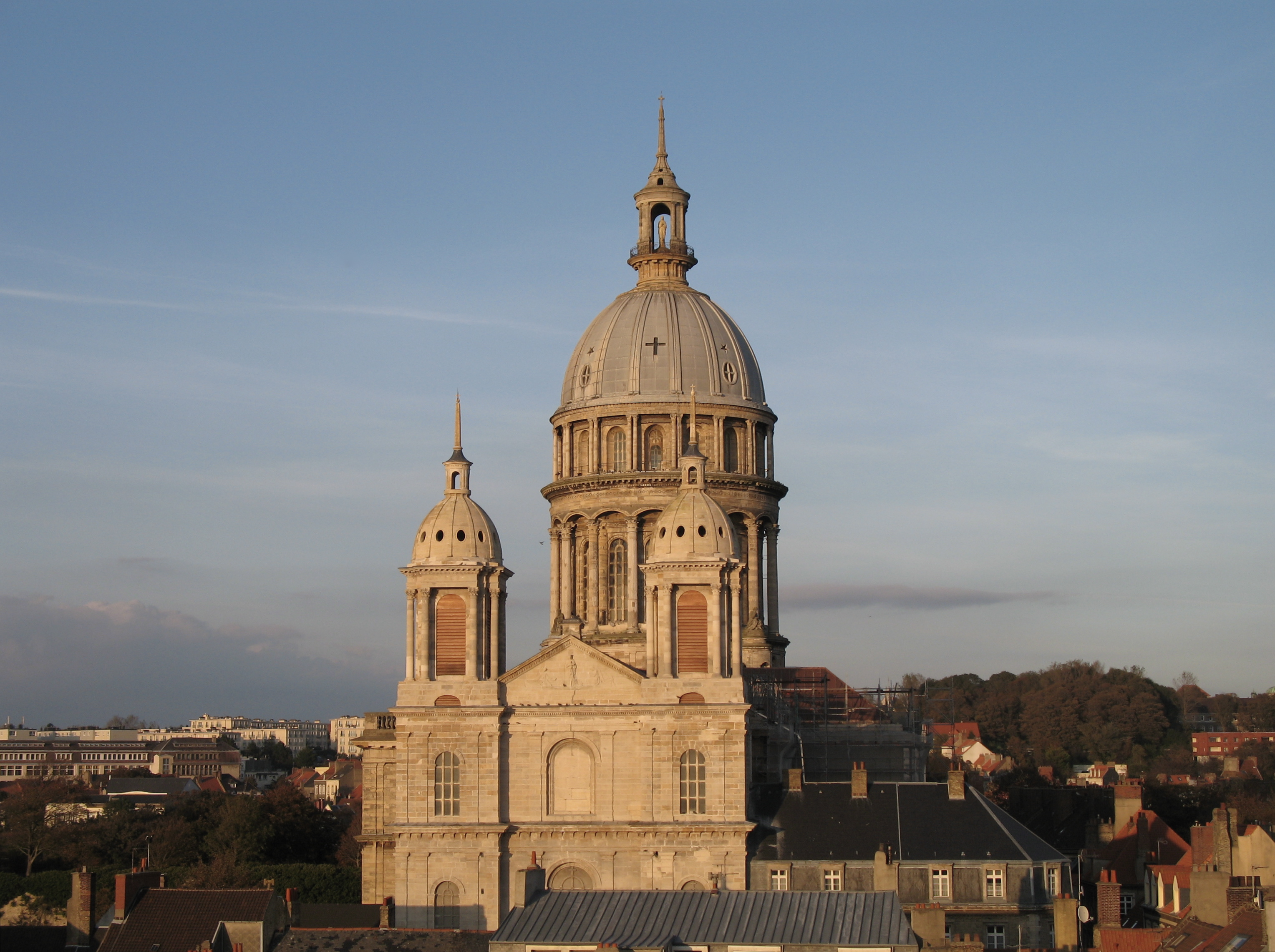
The Basilica of Notre-Dame de Boulogne towers over the city.

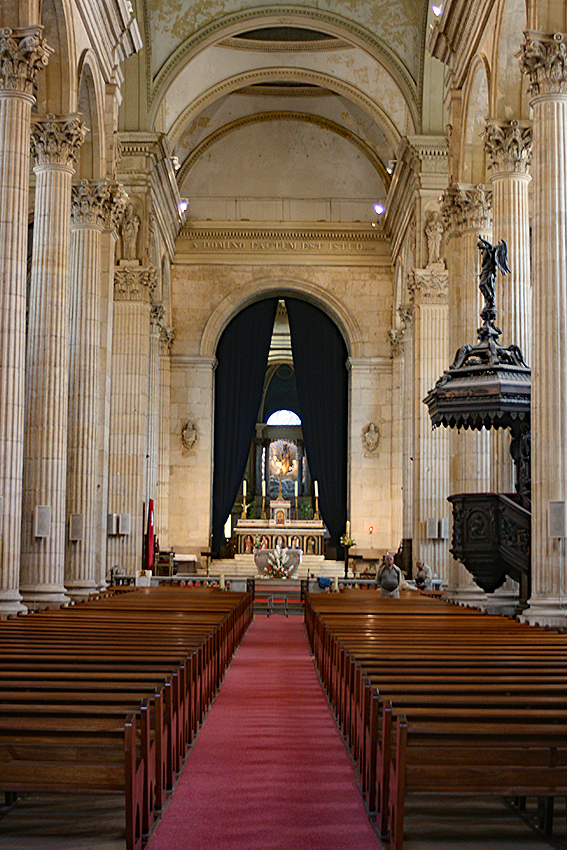
Interior of nave, Basilica of Nôtre Dame

He is known for having rebuilt the Cathedral of Notre Dame in Boulogne-sur-Mer as a result of what he believed was a call from God. Haffreingue was the principal of a private Jesuit boarding school for boys (now known as "Le collège Haffreingue-Chanclaire") in the town which included among its former students the New Zealand architect Francis Petre. He was appointed principal of the college in 1813 by the Vice-chancellor of the Academy of Douai and remained in this position until his death in 1871.

Haffreingue was born in the rural hamlet of Haringzelles, today a ruin. He was baptized at Audinghen on July 4, 1785. He was the son of the agricultural labourer François Hamerel and his wife Marie-Catherine. His early life is unknown. He obviously received a Jesuit education, and was ordained a priest sometime before 1813, the year he was appointed to the Jesuit school in Boulogne-sur-Mer.

In 1820, Haffreingue was walking past the derelict ruins of the old cathedral, destroyed during the French Revolution, close to the school, when he believed he received a call from God to rebuild the edifice. Acting on the call with money given by the families of his pupils, he bought the ground and the remains of the cathedral and built a small chapel for the college. A few months later a benefactor donated 48,000 French francs for further reconstruction; this sum was later doubled. With this money Haffreingue constructed in front of the new chapel a Renaissance-style rotunda for use as a public church. This further construction seems to have been the catalyst for an unprecedented wave of fund-raising. Money for the cathedral's reconstruction poured in from all over France, and England.

The cathedral once again became a place of pilgrimage, with visitors at first coming from Abbeville and Amiens, then from Belgium and England. The donations continued to pour in: the Emperor Napoleon III gave a gift of 1,000 francs, and also bestowed on Haffreingue the Legion of Honour.

The design of the reconstructed cathedral was said to have been inspired by St Paul's Cathedral in London, which in turn was inspired by the great Renaissance cathedrals of Italy. One of the greatest gifts to the reconstruction project was that of 147 different marbles donated by the Prince of Torlonia valued in 1860 at 500,000 francs. Artists imported from Rome worked on the decoration of the new building for over ten years, while a further 160 labourers worked towards the final completion.

The cathedral became the life's work of Haffreingue: it was his ambition that the church would be a meeting point for both the Catholic and Protestant communities. Remaining all his life a modest man, he erected a plaque above the gate to the cathedral reading "A Domino factum est" (tr. The work of the Lord).

In 1859 in recognition of his work Pope Pius IX named him a "protonotaire apostolic", thus according him the title of Monseigneur.
