= Boulogne-sur-Mer =

Subprefecture and commune in Hauts-de-France, France

Boulogne-sur-Mer Bonen (West Flemish) Boulonne-su-Mér (Picard)
- Subprefecture and commune
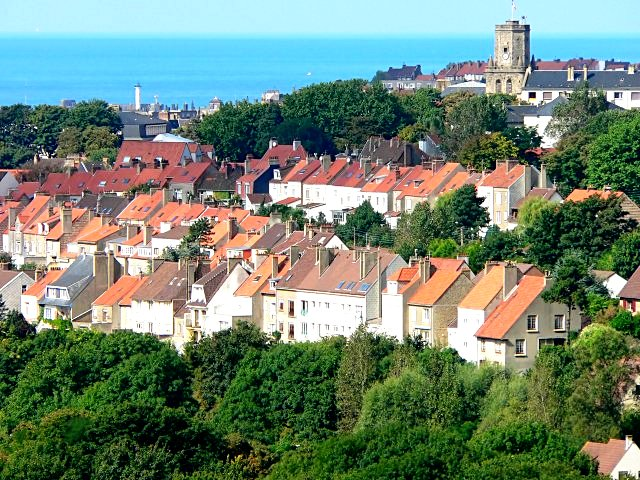
- A general view from the Brecquerecque Quarter: The modern lighthouse, the medieval bell tower and the English Channel

- Flag Coat of arms
- Location of Boulogne-sur-Mer
- Location within France Location within Hauts-de-France
- Coordinates: 50°43′35″N 1°36′53″E
- Country: France
- Region: Hauts-de-France
- Department: Pas-de-Calais
- Arrondissement: Boulogne-sur-Mer
- Canton: Boulogne-sur-Mer-1 and 2
- Intercommunality: CA du Boulonnais

Government
  - Mayor (2026–32): Frédéric Cuvillier (PS)
- Area^{1}: 8.42 km^{2} (3.25 sq mi)
  - Urban: 62.8 km^{2} (24.2 sq mi)
  - Metro: 667 km^{2} (258 sq mi)
- Highest elevation: 110 m (360 ft)
- Lowest elevation: 0 m (0 ft)
- Population (2023): 40,539
  - Density: 4,810/km^{2} (12,500/sq mi)
  - Urban (2022): 84,212
  - Urban density: 1,340/km^{2} (3,470/sq mi)
  - Metro (2022): 159,973
  - Metro density: 240/km^{2} (621/sq mi)
- Demonym: Boulonnaise
- Time zone: UTC+01:00 (CET)
  - Summer (DST): UTC+02:00 (CEST)
- INSEE/Postal code: 62160 /62200
- Website: http://www.ville-boulogne-sur-mer.fr/
- ^{1} French Land Register data, which excludes lakes, ponds, glaciers > 1 km^{2} (0.386 sq mi or 247 acres) and river estuaries.

Boulogne-sur-Mer (French: [bulɔɲ syʁ mɛʁ]; Picard: Boulonne-su-Mér; Dutch: Bonen; Latin: Gesoriacum or Bononia), often called just Boulogne (UK: /bʊˈlɔɪn/, US: /buːˈloʊn, buːˈlɔɪn/), is a port city in Northern France. It is a sub-prefecture of the department of Pas-de-Calais. Boulogne lies on the Côte d'Opale, a touristic stretch of French coast on the English Channel between Calais and Normandy, and the most visited location in the region after the Lille conurbation. Boulogne is its department's third-largest city after Calais and Arras. It is also the country's largest fishing port, specialising in herring.

Boulogne is an ancient town and was the main Roman port for trade and communication with its Province of Britain. After a period of Germanic presence following the collapse of the Empire, Boulogne was integrated into the County of Boulogne of the Kingdom of France during the Middle Ages. It was occupied by the Kingdom of England numerous times due to conflict between the two nations. In 1805 it was a staging area for Napoleon's troops for several months during his planned invasion of the United Kingdom.

The city's 12th-century belfry is recognised by UNESCO as a World Heritage Site (along with other belfries of Belgium and France), while another popular attraction is the marine conservation centre Nausicaa.

== Etymology ==
The French name Boulogne derives from the Latin Bononia, which was also the Roman name for Bologna in Italy. Both places – and Vindobona (Vienna) – are thought to have derived from native Celtic placenames, with bona possibly meaning "foundation", "citadel", or "granary". The French epithet sur-Mer ("on sea") distinguishes the city from Boulogne-Billancourt on the edge of Paris. In turn, the Boulogne in Boulogne-Billancourt originates from a church there dedicated to Notre-Dame de Boulogne, "Our Lady of Boulogne[-sur-Mer]".

== History ==
=== Origin of the city ===
The foundation of the city known to the Romans as Gesoriacum is credited to the Celtic Boii. In the past, it was sometimes conflated with Caesar's Portus Itius, but that is now thought to have been a site near Calais which has since silted up. A tall lighthouse was built at Gesoriacum circa 39 AD by order of the Emperor Caligula, possibly in preparation for an invasion of Britain. Known as the Tour d'Ordre, coastal erosion caused it to topple into the sea in 1644.

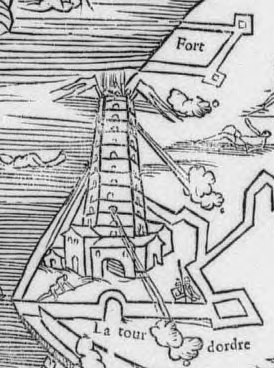
The Tour d'Ordre, a Roman lighthouse, in 1550. It fell into the sea in 1644, having stood for over 1600 years.

From the time of Claudius's invasion in AD 43, Gesoriacum formed the major port connecting the rest of the empire to Britain. It was the chief base of the Roman navy's Britannic fleet until the rebellion of its admiral Carausius in 286. As part of the imperial response, the junior emperor Constantius Chlorus successfully besieged it by land and sea in 293. The name of the settlement was changed to Bononia at some point between the sack of Gesoriacum and 310, possibly as a consequence of its refounding or possibly by the replacement of the sacked and lower-lying city by another nearby community.

The city was an important town of the Morini (the 'sea people'), and Zosimus called it Germanorum ("Germanic-speaking") at the end of the 4th century.

=== Middle Ages ===
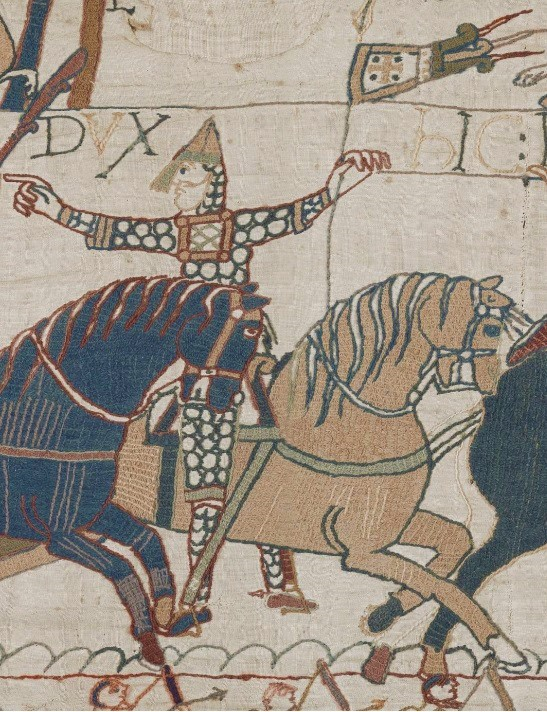
Eustace II, Count of Boulogne, as shown on the Bayeux Tapestry.

In the Middle Ages Boulogne was the capital of an eponymous county, founded in the mid-9th century. An important Count, Eustace II, assisted William the Conqueror in his conquest of England. His wife founded the church that would become the Notre Dame cathedral, which housed a miraculous statue and became a site of pilgrimage from the 12th century onwards, attended by fourteen French kings and five of England. It was an important whaling center prior to 1121. The city survived on herring fishing and received its municipal charter from Count Renaud of Dammartin in 1203.

The area was fought over by the French and the English, including several English occupations during the course of the Hundred Years War. In 1492 Henry VII laid siege to Boulogne before the conflict was ended by the Peace of Étaples. Boulogne was again occupied by the English from 1544 to 1550. In 1550, The Peace of Boulogne ended the war of England with Scotland and France. France bought back Boulogne for 400,000 crowns. A culture of smuggling was present in the city until 1659, when French gains in Flanders from the Treaty of the Pyrenees moved the border northwards.

=== 19th century ===
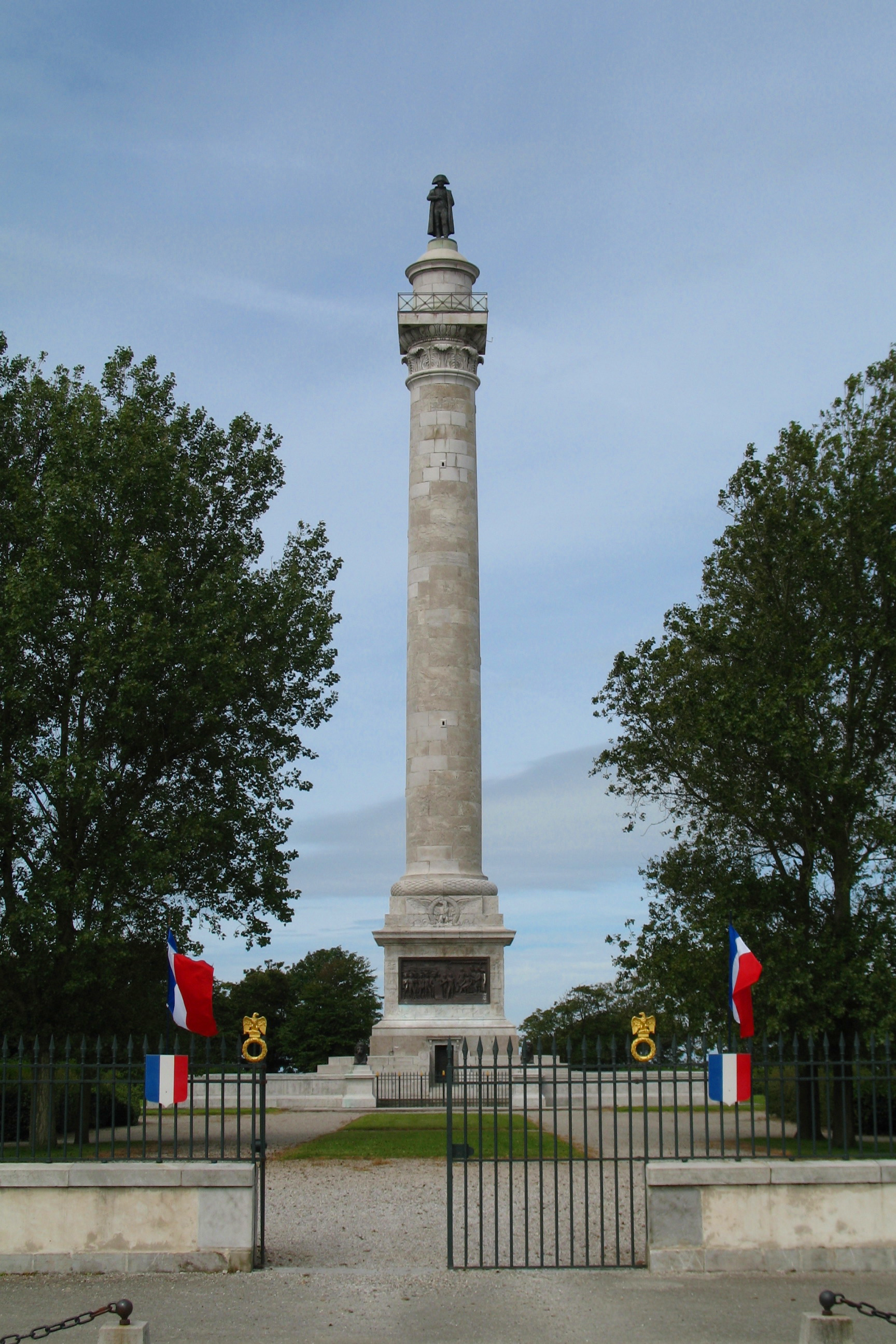
The Column of the Grande Armée commemorates Napoleon's gathering of 200,000 soldiers near Boulogne for a proposed invasion of the United Kingdom. His statue is at the top

Boulogne received its current status as a subprefecture of the Pas-de-Calais department in 1800 due to the territorial re-organisation in Revolutionary France. France became the French Empire in 1804; in 1803 Boulogne became an Imperial City (Ville Impériale).

The 19th century was a prosperous one for Boulogne, which became a bathing resort for wealthy Parisians after the 1848 completion of the Longueau–Boulogne railway connecting the town with the French capital. In the 19th century, the Basilica of Notre-Dame de Boulogne was reconstructed by the priest Benoît Haffreingue, who claimed to have received a call from God in 1820 to reconstruct the town's ruined basilica. During the Napoleonic Wars, Napoleon amassed La Grande Armée in Boulogne to invade the United Kingdom in 1805. However, his plans were halted by other European matters and by the supremacy of the Royal Navy.

A nephew of Napoleon Bonaparte, Louis-Napoleon Bonaparte (subsequently the emperor Napoleon III), returned to France in secret from his exile in Britain, passing through Boulogne in August 1840. He was later jailed for trying to lead a revolt in Strasbourg.

=== World wars ===
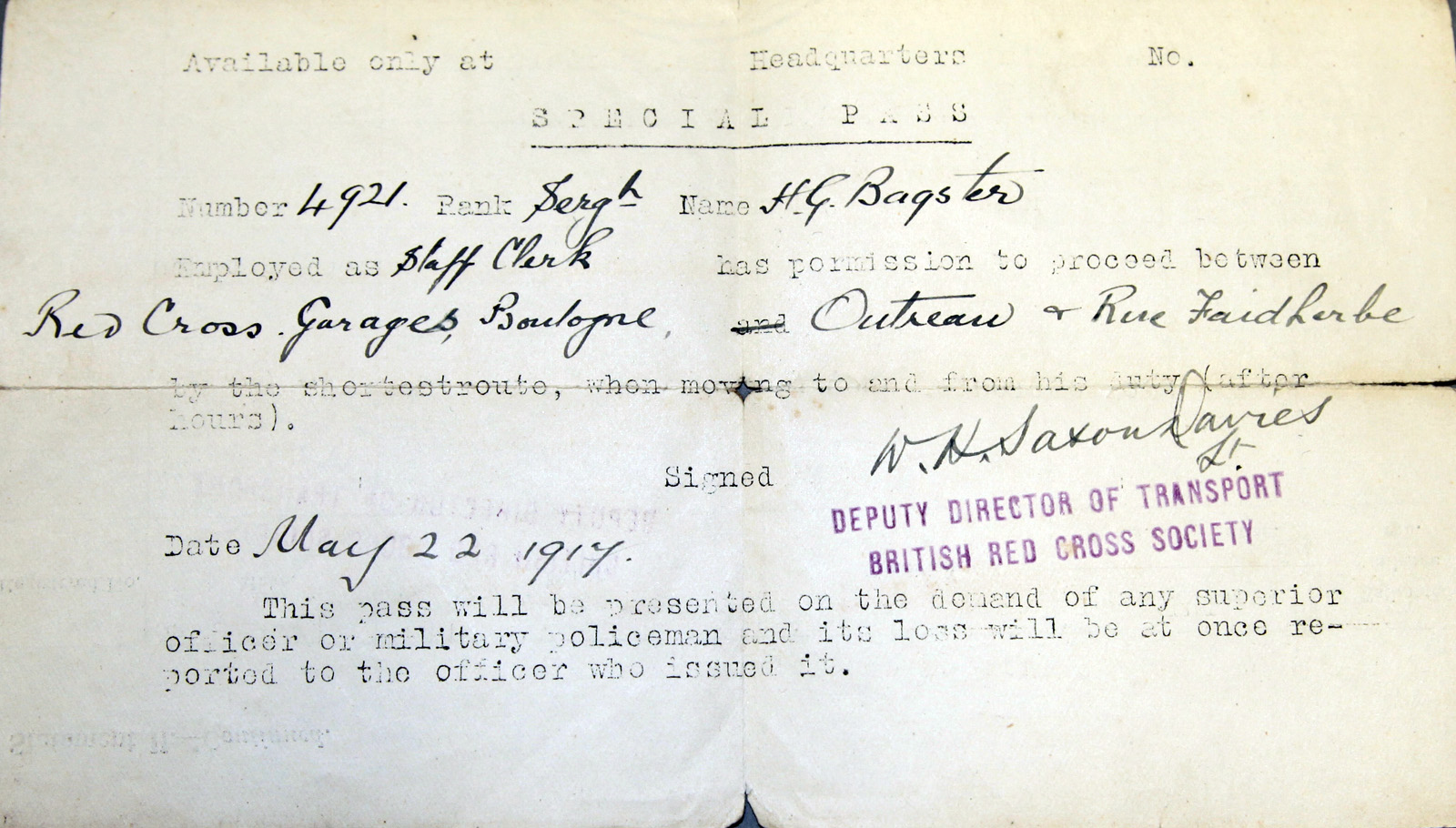
A "special pass" issued for travel within Boulogne by the British Red Cross in May 1917, during World War I

During the First World War, this was the entrepôt for the first unit of the British Expeditionary Force to land in France and for many others thereafter. Boulogne was one of the three base ports most extensively used by the Commonwealth armies on the Western Front throughout the First World War. It was closed and cleared on 27 August 1914 when the Allies were forced to fall back ahead of the German advance, but was opened again in October and from that month to the end of the war, Boulogne and Wimereux formed one of the chief hospital areas.

Until June 1918, the dead from the hospitals at Boulogne were buried in the Cimetiere de L'Est, one of the town's cemeteries, the Commonwealth graves forming a long, narrow strip along the right hand edge of the cemetery. In the spring of 1918, it was found that space was running short in the Eastern Cemetery in spite of repeated extensions to the south and the site of the new cemetery at Terlincthun was chosen. It also was the site of an Allied (French and British) armaments production conference.

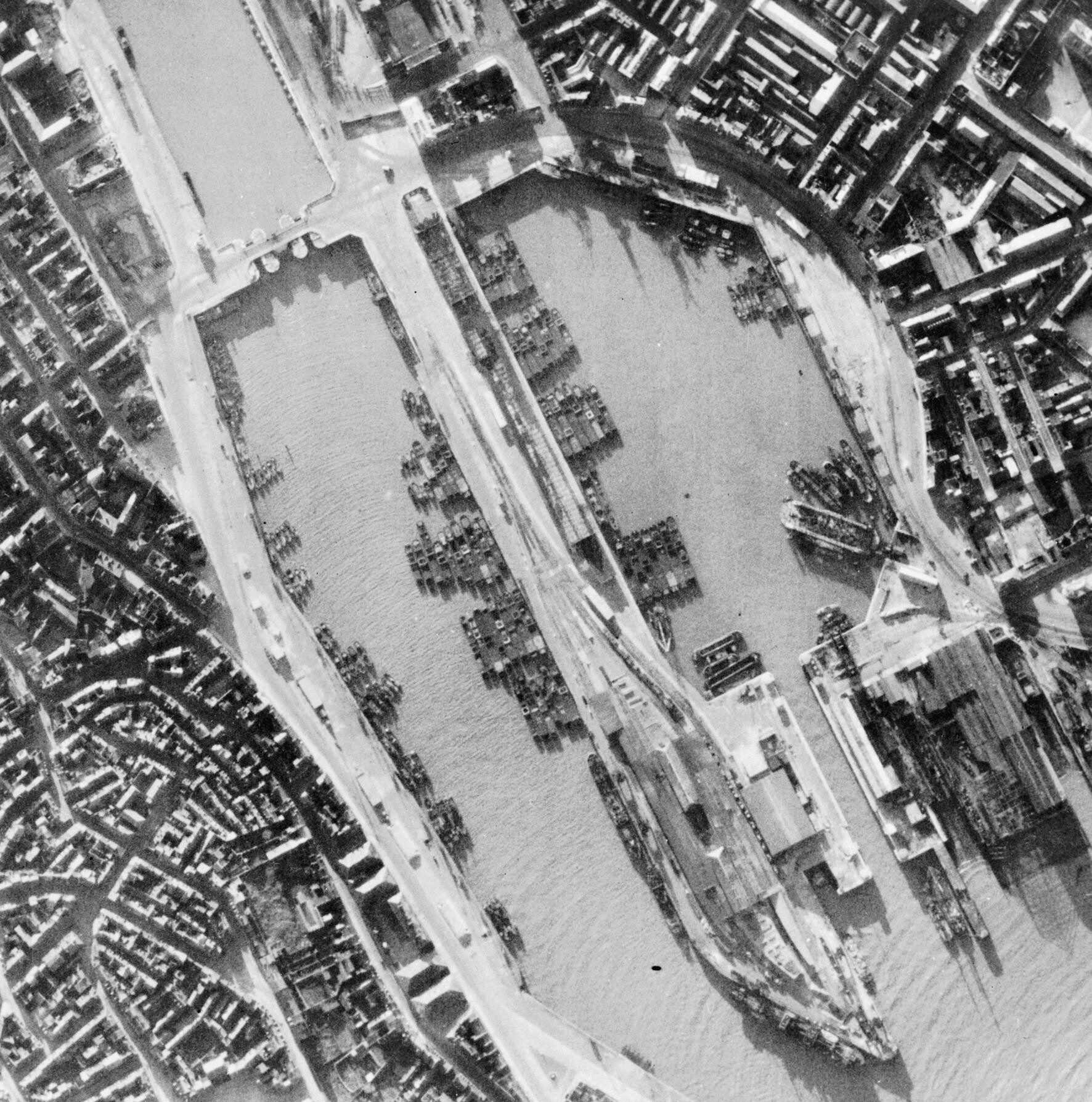
German invasion barges in Boulogne Harbour during the Battle of Britain in summer 1940

On 22 May 1940 during the Battle of France, two British Guards battalions and some pioneers attempted to defend Boulogne against an attack by the German 2nd Panzer Division. Despite fierce fighting, the British were overwhelmed and the survivors were evacuated by Royal Navy destroyers while under direct German gunfire. On 15 June 1944, 297 aircraft (155 Avro Lancasters, 130 Handley Page Halifaxes, and 12 De Havilland Mosquitos) of the Royal Air Force bombed Boulogne harbour to suppress German naval activity following D-Day. Some of the Lancasters carried Tallboy bombs and the harbour and the surrounding area were completely destroyed. In August 1944 the town was declared a "fortress" by Adolf Hitler but it succumbed to Operation Wellhit, the assault and liberation by the 3rd Canadian Infantry Division in September. In one incident, a French civilian guided the Canadians to a "secret passage" leading into the walled old town and by-passing the German defenders.

To replace the destroyed urban infrastructure, affordable housing and public facility projects in functional, brutalist building styles were carried out in the 1950s and 60s.

== Geography ==
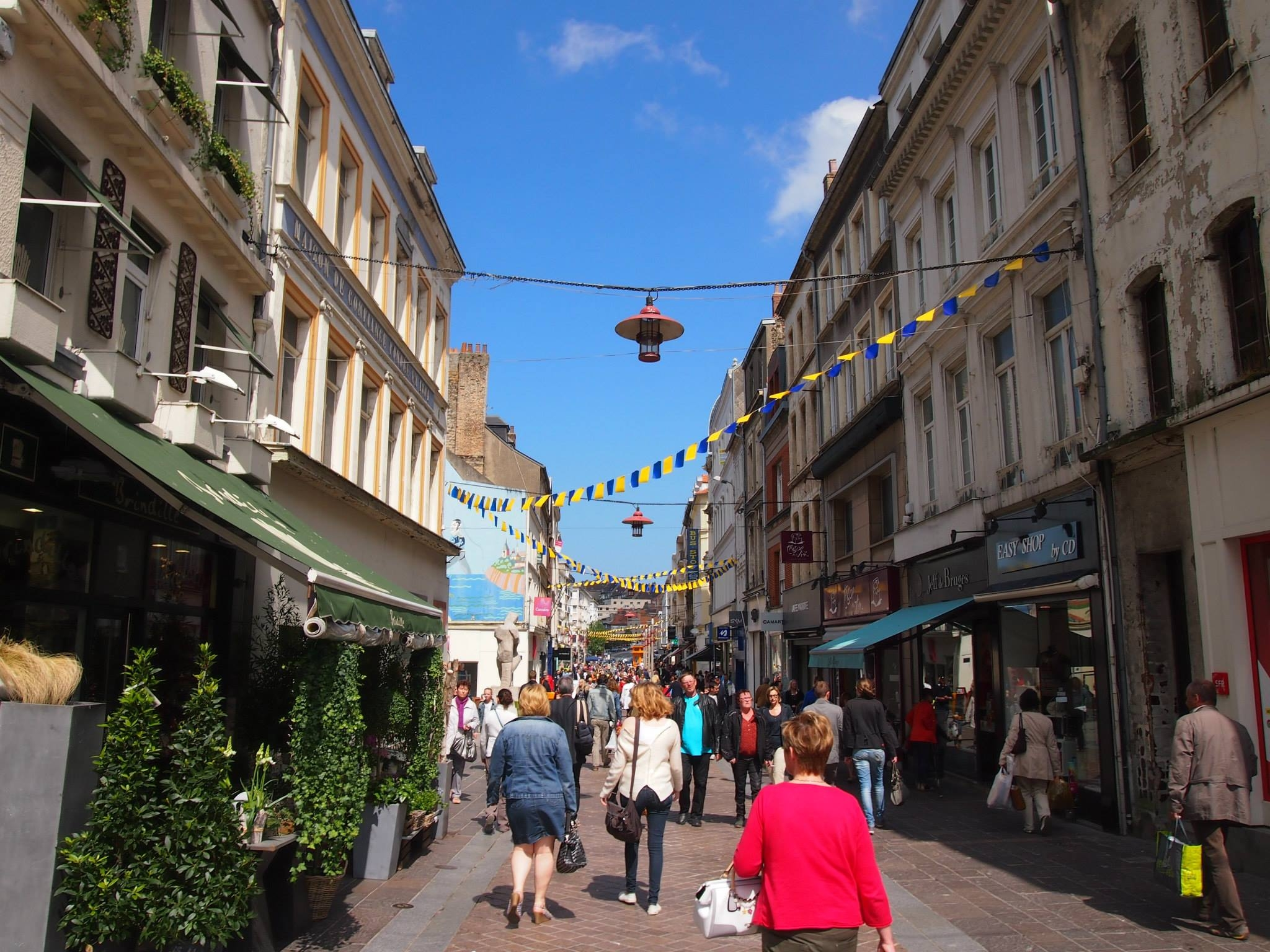
Pedestrian street in the city centre

=== Location ===
Boulogne-sur-Mer is in Northern France, at the edge of the Channel and in the mouth of the river Liane. In a direct line, Boulogne is approximately at 30 kilometres (19 miles) from Calais, 50 kilometres (31 miles) from Folkestone, 100 kilometres (62 miles) from Lille and Amiens, 150 kilometres (93 miles) from Rouen and London and 215 kilometres (134 miles) from Paris.

Boulogne is a relatively important city of the North, exercising an influence on the Boulonnais territory (74 towns and villages which surround Boulogne). The coast consists of important tourist natural sites, like the capes Gris Nez and Blanc Nez (which are the closest points of France to England), and attractive seaside resorts like Wimereux, Wissant, Hardelot and Le Touquet. The hinterland is mainly rural and agricultural.

=== Urbanisation ===
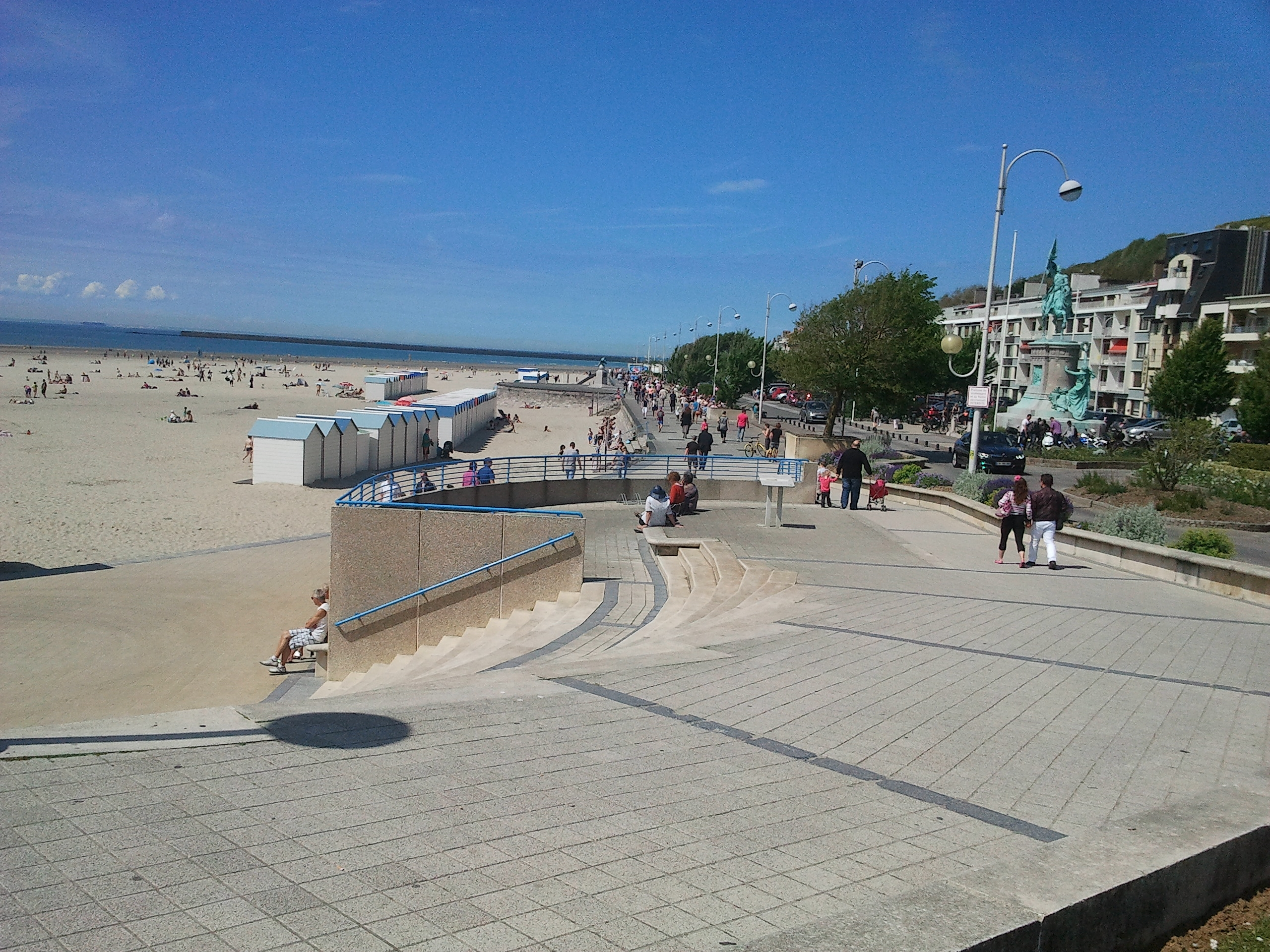
The beachfront

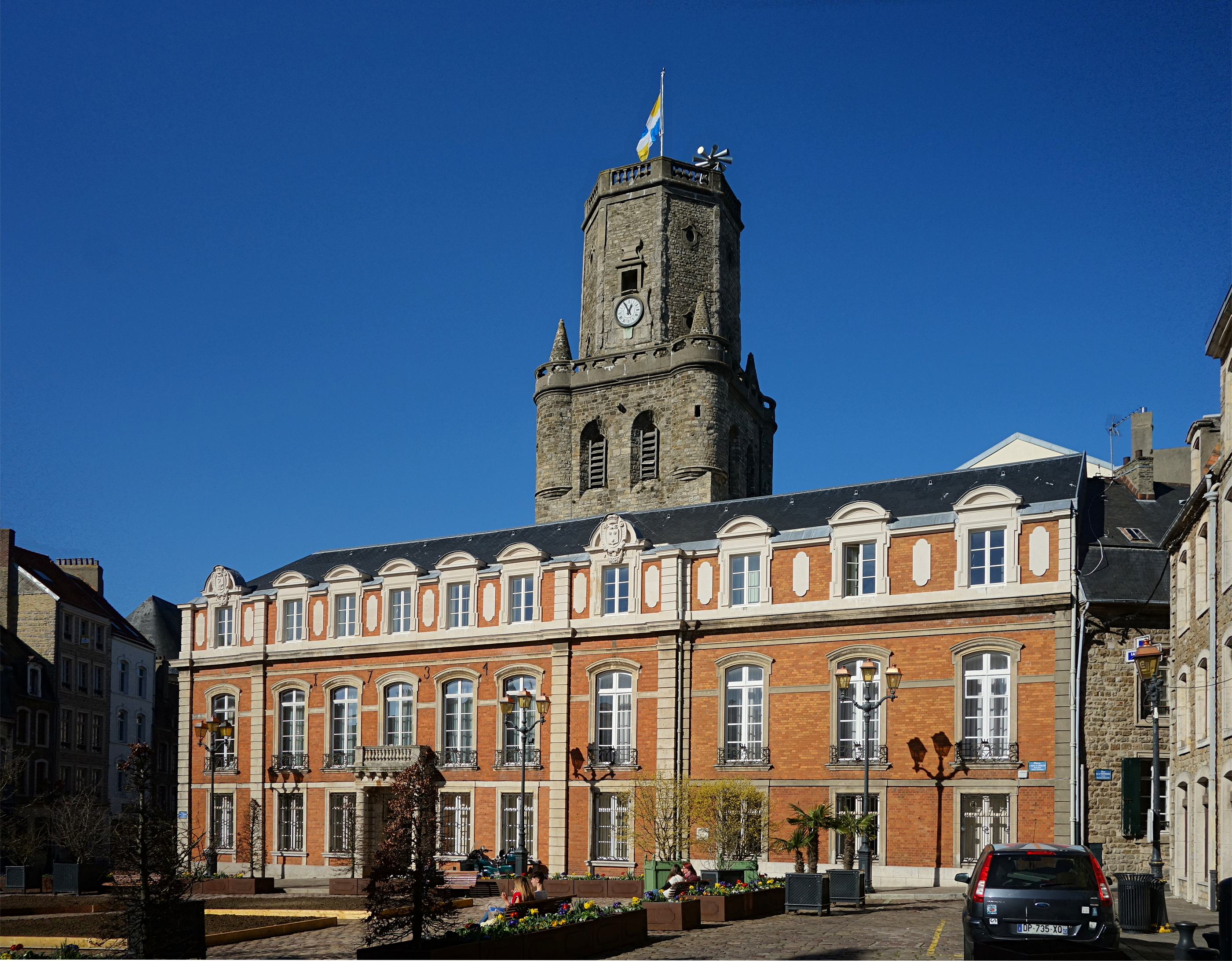
The Hôtel de Ville

The city is divided into several parts :

- City centre : groups historic and administrative buildings, and also accommodations, stores, banks, churches, pedestrian streets and places.
- Fortified town : old-town where are a lot of historic monuments (the castle-museum, the basilica, the belfry, the imperial palace) and also the Hôtel de Ville.
- Gambetta-Sainte-Beuve : tourist area situated in the northwest of the city, on the edge of the beach and the recreational harbour.
- Capécure : economic and industrial area, situated in the west of the city, around the harbour.
- Saint-Pierre (Saint Peter) : former neighborhood of the fishermen, destroyed during World War II and reconstructed after.
- Chemin Vert (Green path) : zone created in the 1950s, knowing today poverty and unemployment. it is the neighbourhood of Franck Ribéry.
- Dernier Sou (Last penny) : residential area situated in the east of the city.
- Beaurepaire (Beautiful hideout) : residential area situated in the north of the city.
- Bréquerecque : residential area situated in the south of the city.

=== Climate ===
Boulogne-sur-Mer has an oceanic climate that has chilly winters not far above freezing and cool summers tempered by its exposure to the sea. Considering its position, the climate is quite cold in relation to south and east coast locations in England year round. Due to warm winds originating inland, the record temperatures in summer are well above the averages and the warmest day of the year is averaging about 31 °C (88 °F). Summer diurnal temperature variation is low, with normals varying between nights of 15 °C (59 °F) with days at about 20 °C (68 °F). Precipitation is also higher than in said southern English locations. Between 1981 and 2010 the precipitation days averaged 125.3 annually, although overall precipitation increased somewhat in the next averages of 1991 to 2020.

Climate data for Boulogne-sur-Mer, elevation: 73 m (240 ft) (1991-2020 normals, extremes 1947-present)
Month	Jan	Feb	Mar	Apr	May	Jun	Jul	Aug	Sep	Oct	Nov	Dec	Year
Record high °C (°F)	16.4 (61.5)	19.2 (66.6)	22.7 (72.9)	26.0 (78.8)	31.9 (89.4)	36.1 (97.0)	39.6 (103.3)	34.8 (94.6)	32.6 (90.7)	27.2 (81.0)	19.1 (66.4)	17.2 (63.0)	39.6 (103.3)
Mean daily maximum °C (°F)	7.1 (44.8)	7.3 (45.1)	9.7 (49.5)	12.7 (54.9)	15.6 (60.1)	18.1 (64.6)	20.1 (68.2)	20.7 (69.3)	18.5 (65.3)	14.9 (58.8)	10.8 (51.4)	7.9 (46.2)	13.6 (56.5)
Daily mean °C (°F)	5.3 (41.5)	5.4 (41.7)	7.4 (45.3)	9.8 (49.6)	12.7 (54.9)	15.3 (59.5)	17.4 (63.3)	18.0 (64.4)	15.8 (60.4)	12.6 (54.7)	8.8 (47.8)	6.0 (42.8)	11.2 (52.2)
Mean daily minimum °C (°F)	3.4 (38.1)	3.4 (38.1)	5.0 (41.0)	7.0 (44.6)	9.8 (49.6)	12.5 (54.5)	14.7 (58.5)	15.3 (59.5)	13.2 (55.8)	10.3 (50.5)	6.8 (44.2)	4.1 (39.4)	8.8 (47.8)
Record low °C (°F)	−13.4 (7.9)	−13.6 (7.5)	−7.8 (18.0)	−2.0 (28.4)	1.6 (34.9)	4.0 (39.2)	8.0 (46.4)	9.0 (48.2)	5.8 (42.4)	−1.0 (30.2)	−5.6 (21.9)	−9.6 (14.7)	−13.6 (7.5)
Average precipitation mm (inches)	77.0 (3.03)	56.0 (2.20)	48.0 (1.89)	48.1 (1.89)	54.6 (2.15)	48.0 (1.89)	54.3 (2.14)	63.2 (2.49)	69.6 (2.74)	95.8 (3.77)	106.8 (4.20)	103.1 (4.06)	824.5 (32.46)
Average precipitation days (≥ 1.0 mm)	13.4	10.8	9.4	8.7	8.8	8.5	8.2	8.7	9.7	12.8	13.8	14.4	127.2
Source: Meteociel

== Transport ==
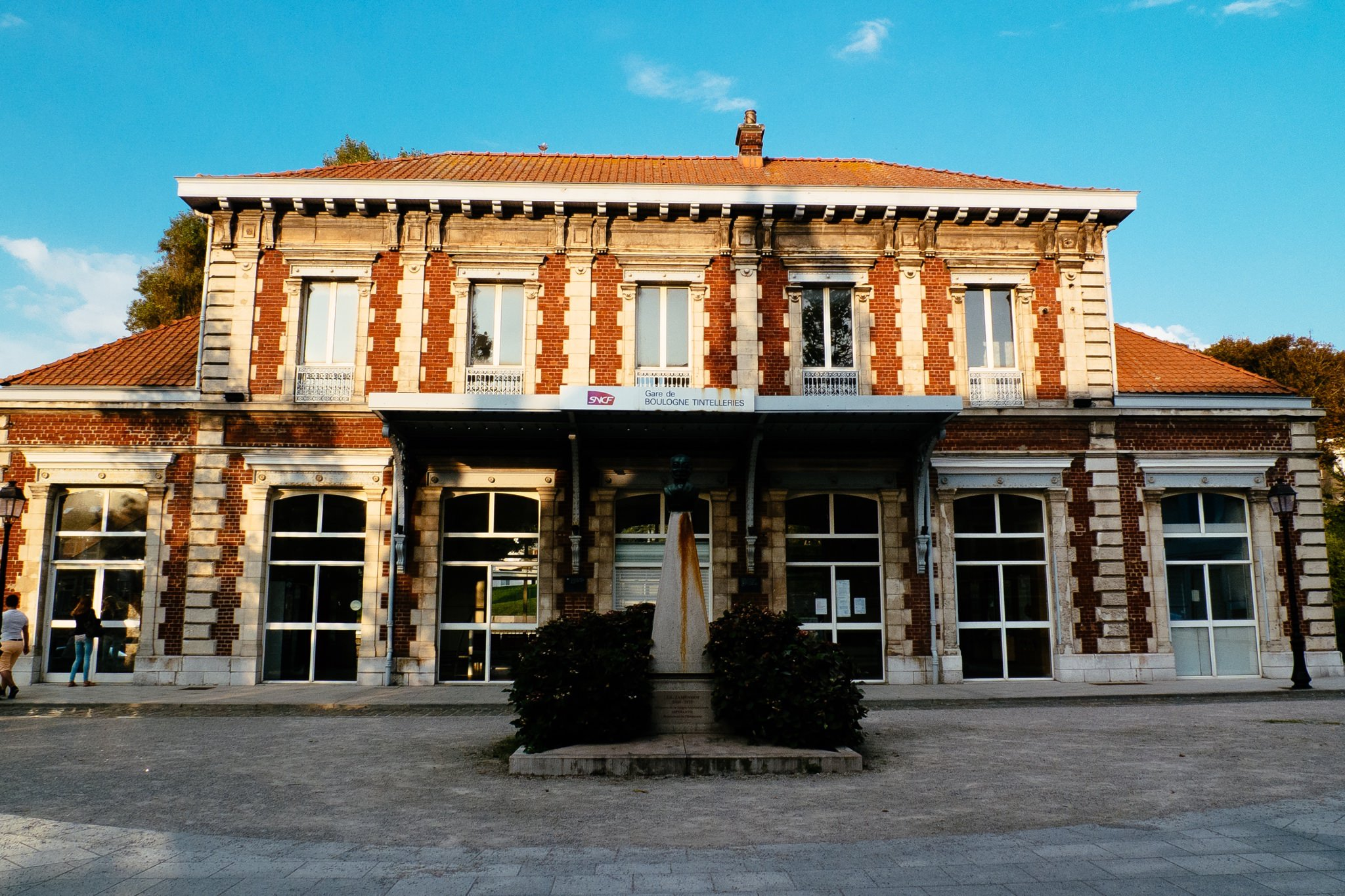
Gare de Boulogne-Tintelleries

Boulogne is close to the A16 motorway (Paris-Amiens-Calais-Dunkerque). Metropolitan bus services are operated by "Marinéo". The company Flixbus proposed establishing a bus line connecting Paris to Boulogne. There are coach services to Calais and Dunkerque.

The city has several railway stations, of which the most important is Boulogne-Ville station, located in the south of the city. Boulogne-Tintelleries station is used by regional trains. It is located near the university and the city centre. The former Boulogne-Maritime and Boulogne-Aéroglisseurs stations served as a boat connection (to England) for the railway.

Boulogne-Ville was the terminus of the Chemin de fer de Boulogne à Bonningues (CF de BB), which extended their line from Saint-Martin-Boulogne on 12 May 1902. Within Boulogne were also halts at Rue de la Lampe, Rue de la Liane, Abbatoir and La Madelaine. The CF de BB closed to passenger traffic on 31 December 1935. It was reopened in November 1942, and closed in 1948.

The regional trains are TER Hauts-de-France run by SNCF. The principal service runs from Gare de Boulogne-Ville via Gare de Calais-Fréthun, Gare de Calais-Ville to Gare de Lille-Flandres.

From 2026, Hibernia Line will operate a ferry service to and from Cork, re-establishing a ferry operation in Boulogne following the closure of the route to Dover by LD Lines in 2010.

== Landmarks ==
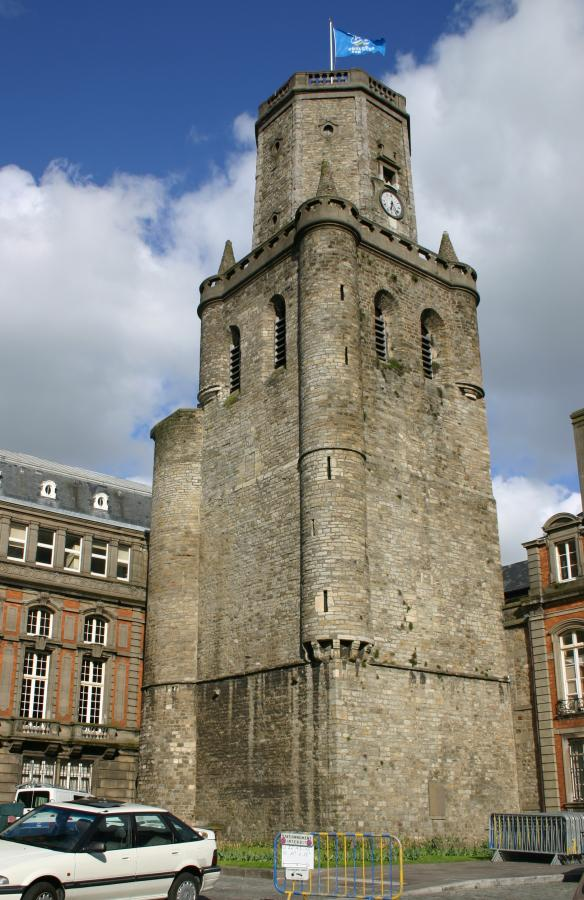
The Belfry is a UNESCO World Heritage Site.

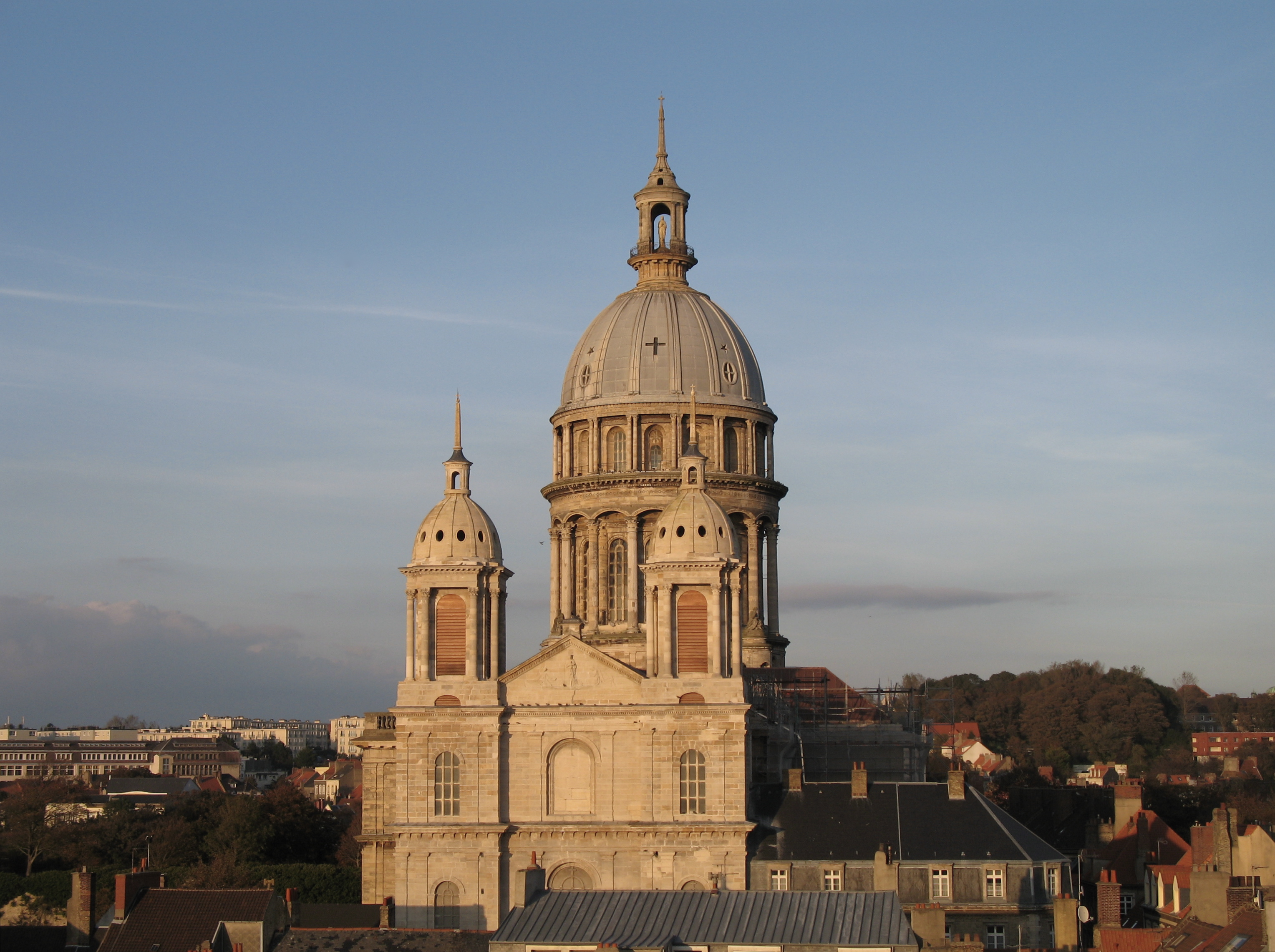
The Basilica of Notre-Dame de Boulogne towers over the city.

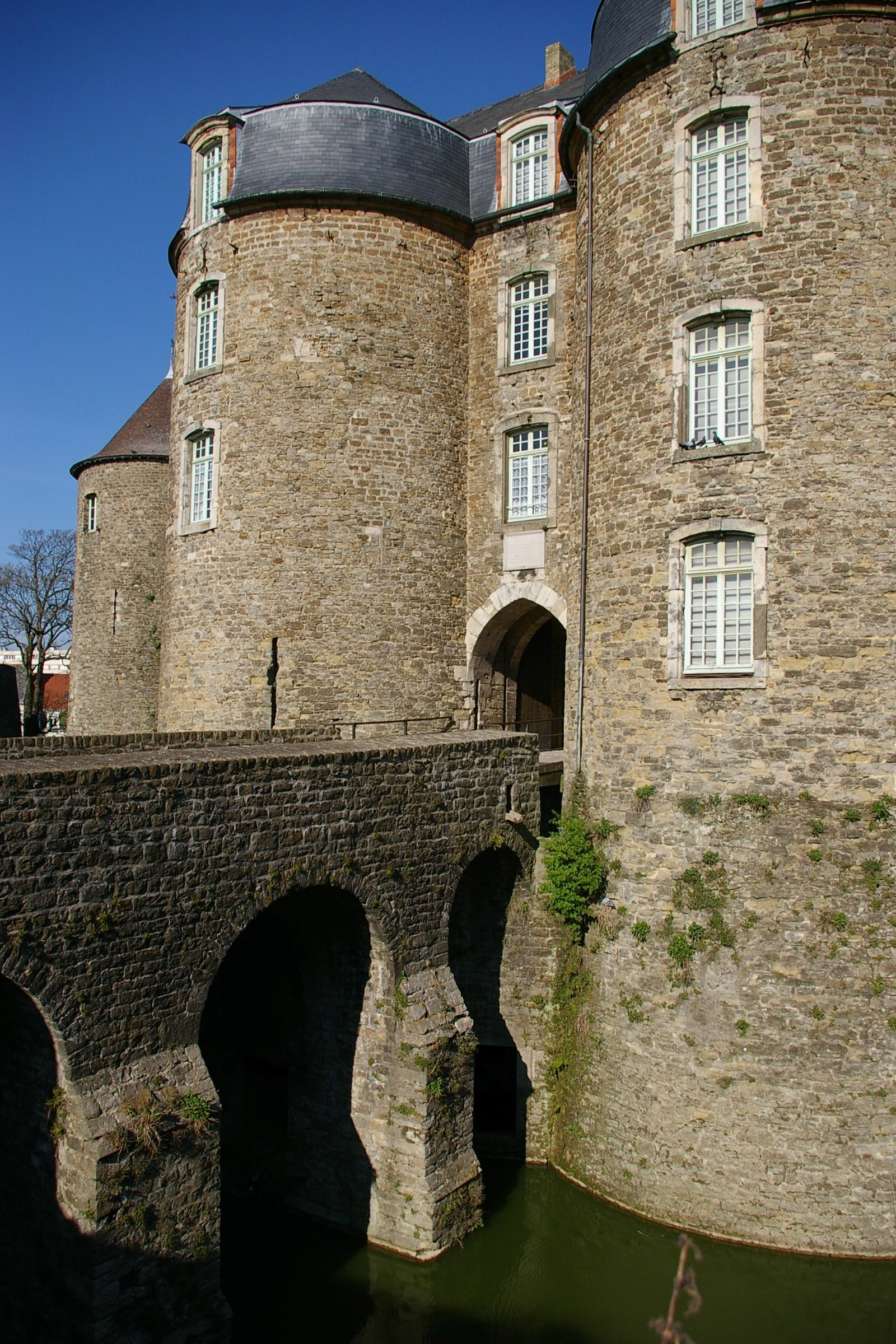
Entrance to the Château de Boulogne-sur-Mer

Boulogne's 12th-century belfry is one of 56 listed Belfries of Belgium and France, all in northeastern France and Belgium, with shared World Heritage Site status because of their architecture and testimony to the rise of municipal power in the region. It is the oldest building in the upper city of Boulogne, and currently serves as the home to a museum of Celtic remains from the Roman occupation. Founded as the Count's dungeon, the top floor was added in the 13th century. Damage by a fire in 1712 was built over by 1734.

Other than the belfry there are also the following sights:

- Medieval walls 1,500 m (4,900 ft) long, with 4 gates and 17 towers from the 13th century
- Medieval castle, whose foundations date to Roman times. It houses an Egyptian art collection, and the ancient Greek Suicide of Ajax Vase.
- Gothic church of St Nicholas, housing several 15th-century statues
- Cathedral basilica of Notre-Dame, with a dome standing at over 100 m (330 ft). The crypt is one of the largest in France, and has Roman, Romanesque and Gothic elements.
- Opened in 1991, Nausicaá – The French National Sea Centre is a science centre entirely dedicated to the relationship between mankind and the sea. It houses Aquaria, exhibitions on marine fauna, and the exploitation and management of marine resources (fisheries, aquaculture, coastal planning, maritime transport, exploitation of energies and mineral, tourism).
- The Boulogne Eastern Cemetery, created during the Great War
- Column of the Grande Armée – Statue of Napoleon I

== Economy ==
Boulogne-sur-Mer is an important fishing port, with 7,000 inhabitants deriving part, or all, of their livelihoods from fishing.

IFREMER (the French Research Institute for Exploitation of the Sea) and the Pasteur Institute are located in Boulogne Port.

Certain brands, including Crown and Findus, have regional offices in Boulogne.

== Media ==
- Radio : France Bleu Nord, Virgin Radio Côte d'Opale
- Television : France 3 Côte d'Opale
- Print : La Voix du Nord (édition de Boulogne sur Mer), La Semaine dans le Boulonnais, Touzazimut

== Events ==
In 1905, the first World Esperanto Congress was held in Boulogne-sur-Mer, where the historic Declaration of Boulogne was ratified. L. L. Zamenhof, the creator of Esperanto, was among the attendees. In 2005, there was an anniversary celebration to mark the centenary with more than 500 attendees.

== Administration ==
- Boulogne is the seat of the Communauté d'agglomération du Boulonnais

List of Mayors
Duration	Name	Party	Particularities
2014–2032	Frédéric Cuvillier	PS	Deputy, Minister
2012–2014	Mireille Hingrez-Céréda	PS
2004–2012	Frédéric Cuvillier	PS	Deputy, Minister
1996–2004	Guy Lengagne	PS	Deputy, Minister
1989–1996	Jean Muselet	Conservative
1977–1989	Guy Lengagne	PS	Deputy, Minister
1945–1977	Henri Henneguelle	PS

== Population ==
In 2022, 41,039 people lived in the commune, while its metropolitan area had a population of 159,973.

Historical population

Year	Pop.	±% p.a.
1793	10,137	—
1800	10,685	+0.75%
1806	13,257	+3.66%
1821	17,728	+1.96%
1831	20,874	+1.65%
1836	25,732	+4.27%
1841	29,145	+2.52%
1846	30,994	+1.24%
1851	30,783	−0.14%
1856	34,739	+2.45%
1861	35,349	+0.35%
1866	38,492	+1.72%
1872	38,514	+0.01%
1876	40,075	+1.00%
1881	44,842	+2.27%
1886	45,916	+0.47%
1891	45,205	−0.31%
1896	46,807	+0.70%
1901	49,949	+1.31%

Year	Pop.	±% p.a.
1906	51,201	+0.50%
1911	53,128	+0.74%
1921	55,336	+0.41%
1926	52,839	−0.92%
1931	51,854	−0.38%
1936	52,371	+0.20%
1946	34,885	−3.98%
1954	41,870	+2.31%
1962	49,281	+2.06%
1968	49,276	−0.00%
1975	48,440	−0.24%
1982	47,653	−0.23%
1990	43,678	−1.08%
1999	44,859	+0.30%
2007	43,840	−0.29%
2012	42,785	−0.49%
2017	40,874	−0.91%
2023	40,539	−0.14%

Source: EHESS and INSEE (1968-2023)

== Education ==
Boulogne-sur-Mer hosts one of the oldest Universités de l'été – summer courses in French language and culture. It is known as the Université d'été de Boulogne-sur-Mer.

The Saint-Louis building of the University of the Côte d'Opale's Boulogne campus opened its doors in 1991, on the site of the former St. Louis Hospital, the front entrance to which remains a predominant architectural feature. Its 6 major specialisms are Modern Languages, French Literature, Sport, Law, History and Economics. The university is situated in the town centre, about 5 minutes from the Boulogne Tintelleries railway station.

=== University ===
- Campus University of the Littoral Opal Coast (Saint-Louis, Grand-Rue and Capérure site), member of Université Lille Nord de France.

=== Public primary and secondary ===
- High schools : Lycée Auguste Mariette, Edouard Branly, Cazin (professional).
- College : College Langevin, Angelier, Daunou.

=== Private primary and secondary ===
- High schools: Lycée Nazareth, Haffreingue, Saint-Joseph
- College: College Godefroy de Bouillon, Haffreingue, Nazareth, Saint-Joseph

== Health ==
Two health centres are located in Boulogne, the public Hospital Duchenne and the private Clinique de la côte d'opale.

== Sports ==
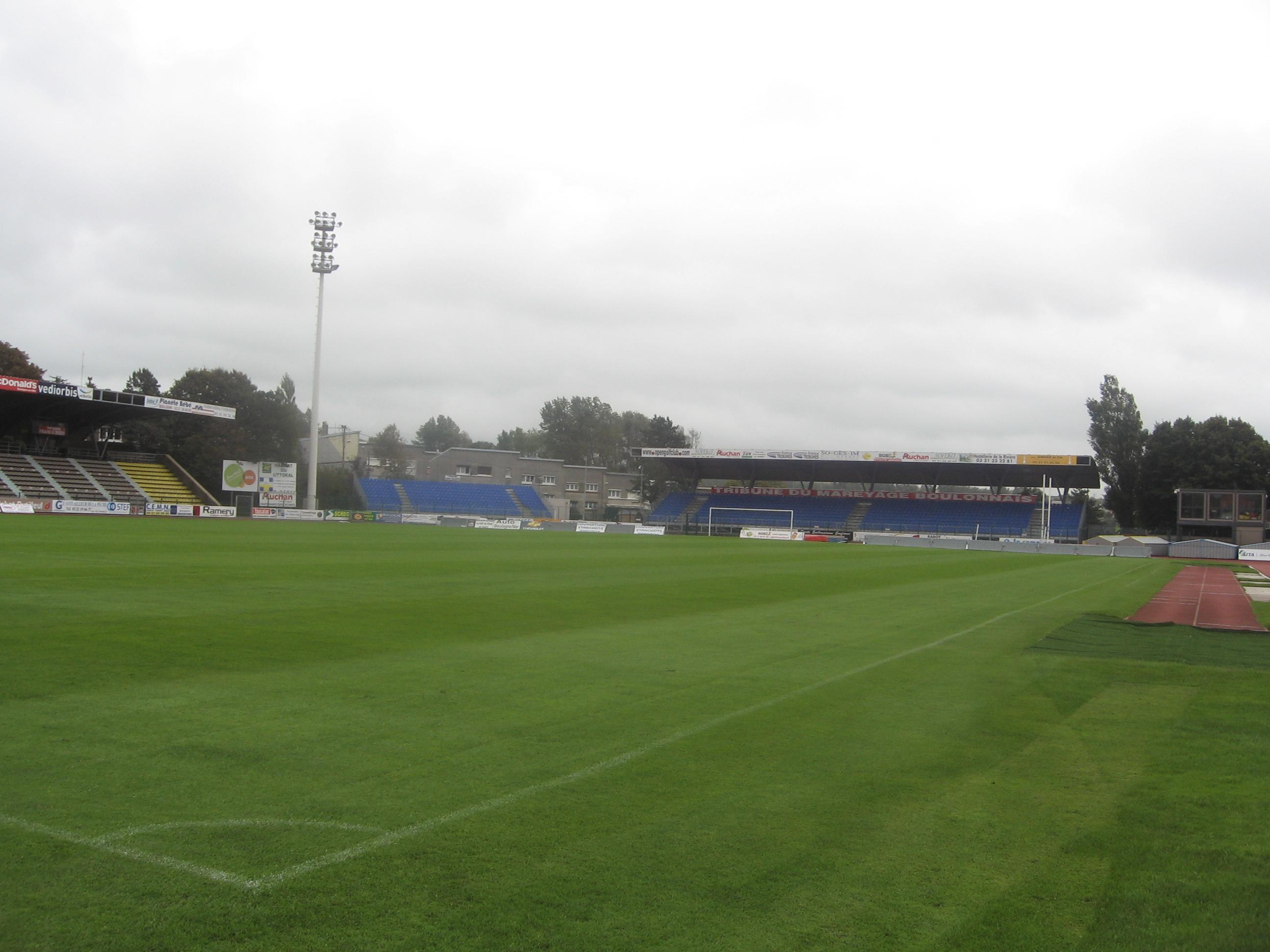
US Boulogne play their home football matches at the 14,500-seat Stade de la Libération.

Boulogne's football club, US Boulogne Côte d'Opale (US refers to Union Sportive), is one of the oldest in France due to the city's proximity to England, founded in 1898. The club currently play in the third tier, the Championnat National, and host home matches at the 14,500-capacity Stade de la Libération. Boulogne native and FIFA World Cup finalist Franck Ribéry began his career at the club.

Basketball teams in Boulogne include Stade Olympique Maritime Boulonnais and ESSM Le Portel of Pro A (first-tier men's professional basketball league in France).

== Culture ==
The Château de Boulogne-sur-Mer (now a castle museum) of Boulogne, in the fortified town, houses the most important exhibition of masks from Alaska in the world, the second largest collection of Greek ceramics in France (after the Louvre), collections of Roman and medieval sculptures, paintings (15th–20th century), an Egyptian collection, African Arts etc. As these collections are exhibited in a medieval castle, one can also discover the Roman walls (in the underground) as well as rooms built in the 13th century (La Barbière, banqueting hall, chapel, covered parapet walk...)

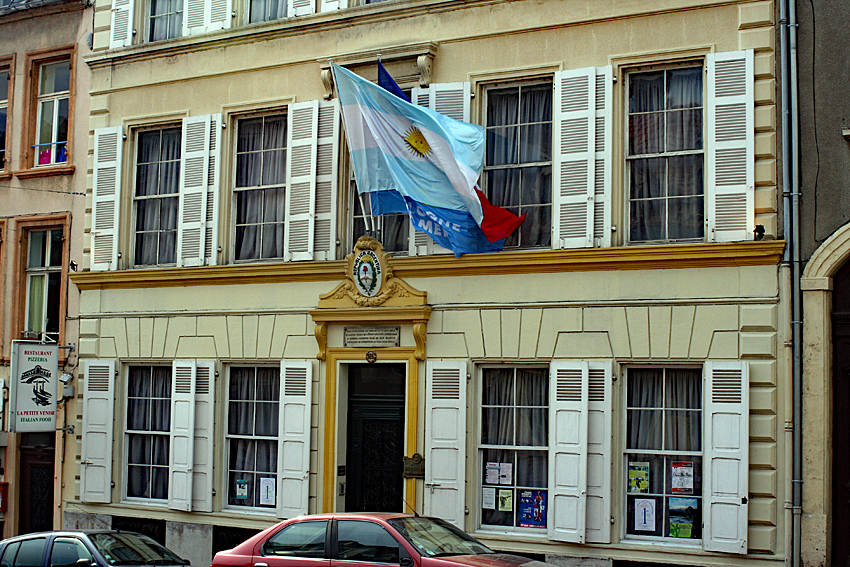
Casa de San Martin, Boulogne-sur-Mer

La Casa San Martin is currently a museum where José de San Martín the father of independence of Argentina (also Chile and Peru) died in 1850, from 1930 to 1967 this house was the consulate of Argentina in France. There is a statue dedicated to his colleague Simón Bolívar, other liberator of South America in the revolutions against Spanish colonial rule in the 1810s. Bolivar planned to head in exile to this very part of France before his death in 1830. Historic emigration in the 19th century from the Nord-Pas de Calais region to Argentina and Chile can explain some cultural ties with South America of the Boulognais and Latino/Ibero-American culture.

Nausicaä, the French national sealife centre.

=== Food ===
As an international maritime port on the English Channel (La Manche), the town of Boulogne-sur-Mer has European and American influences in local cuisine. They include:

- Welsh rarebit (from Wales, United Kingdom)
- Sandwich américain (an American sandwich introduced from the US)
- Kipper (Flemish: smoked herring)

== Notable people ==
=== Born in Boulogne ===
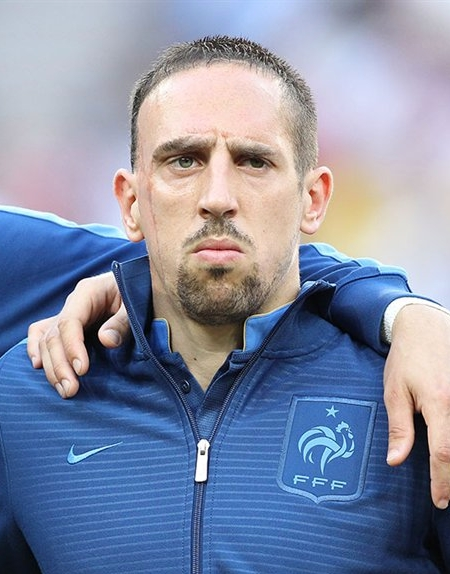
Boulogne-born footballer Franck Ribéry.

- Guynemer (fl. 1090s), pirate.
- Matilda of Boulogne (1105–1152), Countess of Boulogne and queen consort of England; the wife of Stephen, King of England (reigned 1135–1154).
- Michel Le Quien (1661–1733), monk and historian.
- Pierre Daunou (1761–1840), politician and historian.
- Frédéric Sauvage (1786–1857), engineer and a pioneer of the propeller.
- Charles Augustin Sainte-Beuve (1804–1869), literary critic and one of the major figures of French literary history.
- Guillaume Duchenne (1806–1875), neurologist.
- Auguste Delacroix (1809-1868), painter.
- Auguste Mariette (1821–1881), scholar and archaeologist, one of the foremost Egyptologists of his generation, and the founder of the Egyptian Museum in Cairo.
- Joseph O'Kelly (1828–1885), composer and pianist.
- Auguste O'Kelly (1829–1900), music publisher.
- Charles Frédéric O'Kelly (1830–1897), managing director of Blanzy-Poure.
- George O'Kelly (1831–1914), pianist and composer.
- Alexandre Guilmant (1837–1911), organist/composer.
- Étienne-Prosper Berne-Bellecour (1838–1910), painter.
- Benoît-Constant Coquelin (1841–1909), actor.
- Ernest Hamy (1842–1908), anthropologist/ethnologist; created (in 1880) the museum of ethnography of Trocadéro (today known as the Musée de l'Homme, Trocadéro).
- Ernest Alexandre Honoré Coquelin (1848–1909), actor.
- Olivier Latry (1962), Titular Organist of the Cathedral of Notre Dame in Paris, and professor at the Paris Conservatory.
- Henri Malo (1868–1948), writer and historian.
- Léo Marjane (1912–2016), singer.
- Georges Mathieu (1921–2012), famous painter, initiator of "lyrical abstraction" and informal art.
- Michel Caffier (born 1930), writer and literary critic.
- Sophie Daumier (1934–2004), film actress.
- Estha Essombe (born 1963), judoka.
- Jean-Pierre Papin (born 1963), footballer.
- David Ringot (born 1969), footballer.
- Mickaël Bourgain (born 1980), track cyclist.
- Franck Ribéry (born 1983), footballer.
- Terence Makengo (born 1992), footballer.

=== Others associated with Boulogne ===
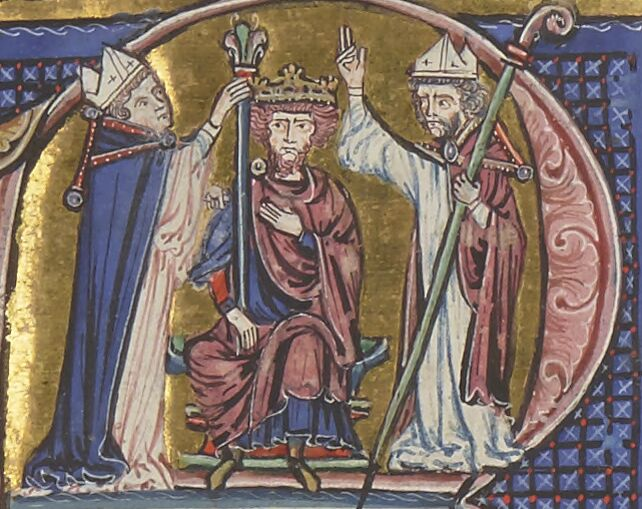
Baldwin I of Jerusalem, son and brother of Counts of Boulogne, ruled the Holy Land in the 11th century.

- Godfrey of Bouillon (c.1060–1100), Count of Boulogne, prominent figure in the First Crusade
- Baldwin I of Jerusalem (c.1058–1118), Count of Boulogne, prominent figure in the First Crusade
- Blaise de Monluc (1502–1577), Marshal of France
- Richard Martin (1754–1834), Irish parliamentarian and animal rights campaigner; exiled to Boulogne in 1826, where he died
- Smithson Tennant (1761–1815), chemist, discoverer of osmium and iridium, died falling from a bridge in Boulogne
- Romeo Coates (1772–1848), amateur actor, fled from London to Boulogne to escape debtor's prison. He lived there for several years, and met his wife during this period.
- Adam Liszt (1776–1827), father of Franz Liszt, died from Typhoid fever while on a vacation
- José de San Martín (1778–1850), Argentine general who liberated Argentina, Chile and Peru; lived for two years in Boulogne and died there
- John Short Hewett (1781–1835), British cleric and academic, died there
- Benoît-Agathon Haffreingue (1785–1871), priest and builder of Boulogne's cathedral
- Félix Godefroid (1818–1897), Belgium-born composer, grew up in Boulogne
- Constant Coquelin (1841–1909), actor
- John McCrae (1872–1918), Canadian doctor, poet; author of In Flanders Field
- Alfred-Georges Regner (1902–1987), painter-engraver
- Maurice Boitel (1919–2007), painter
- Olivier Latry (born 1962), musician, educator
- Grégory Thil (born 1980), footballer
- N'Golo Kanté (born 1991), footballer
- Maëva Coucke (born 1994), Miss France 2018
- Randal Kolo Muani (born 1998), footballer

== International relations ==
Boulogne-sur-Mer is twinned with:

- Folkestone, Kent, United Kingdom
- La Plata, Argentina
- Safi, Morocco – since 2007
- Deux-Ponts (Zweibrücken), Germany – since 1959

== See also ==
- Boulonnais (land area)
- First Siege of Boulogne
- Itius Portus
- Port of Boulogne-sur-Mer
- Vieux-Boulogne
