= Vieux-Boulogne =

Type of cows cheese

- Country of origin: France
- Region, town: Pas-de-Calais département, Boulogne-sur-Mer
- Source of milk: Cows
- Pasteurized: No
- Texture: Soft, moist

Vieux-Boulogne (French pronunciation: [vjø bulɔɲ]; also known as Sablé du Boulonnais [sable dy bulɔnɛ]) is an unpasteurized, unpressed cow's-milk cheese made in the Pas-de-Calais département around the town of Boulogne-sur-Mer in France. It was developed in 1982 by Antoine Bernard and Philippe Olivier.

== Description ==
This artisanal cheese is square in shape, at around 11 cm (4.3 in) across and 4 cm (1.6 in) high, and weighs up to 500 g (18 oz). It has a soft, elastic central pâte, surrounded by a moist, red-orange washed rind that is washed in beer during production. The cheese is pre-salé (pre-salted).

Vieux-Boulogne is famed for its strong smell, and in November 2004 was found by researchers at Cranfield University to be the "smelliest" of 15 French and British cheeses that they tested. A follow-up test done by the same institution using "electronic nose" sensors in March 2007 reaffirmed Vieux-Boulogne's status as the world's "smelliest" cheese.

== Cultural Significance ==
Vieux-Boulogne is widely recognized not only for its pungent smell but also for its distinct beer-washed rind, which gives it a unique umami depth. It has been featured in multiple food documentaries and cheese-tasting competitions as a benchmark for strong, washed-rind cheeses. Some artisanal cheese shops consider it a "rite of passage" for serious cheese lovers.

Its notoriety as the "smelliest cheese in the world" has sparked curiosity among food enthusiasts. While many appreciate its complex aroma and creamy texture, others find its intensity overwhelming. This contrast has made Vieux-Boulogne a popular feature in food challenge videos and sensory experiments.
