= David Ringot =

French footballer (born 1969)

Personal information
- Full name: David Ringot
- Date of birth: 22 May 1969 (age 57)
- Place of birth: Boulogne-sur-Mer, France
- Height: 1.72 m (5 ft 8 in)
- Position: Striker

Senior career*
Years	Team	Apps	(Gls)
1988–1993	Rouen	34	(5)
1993–1995	Chamois Niortais	32	(4)
1995–1996	Montluçon	27	(6)
1996–1997	Tours	27	(5)
1997–1998	Joué-les-Tours	32	(7)
1998–1999	Orange		
1999–2000	Beauvais	4	(1)
2000–2004	Bois-Guillaume		
- * Club domestic league appearances and goals

David Ringot (born 22 May 1969) is a former professional footballer who played as a striker.

== See also ==
- Football in France
- List of football clubs in France
