= Château de Boulogne-sur-Mer =

Castle in Hauts-de-France, France

Coordinates: 50°43′32″N 1°37′1″E

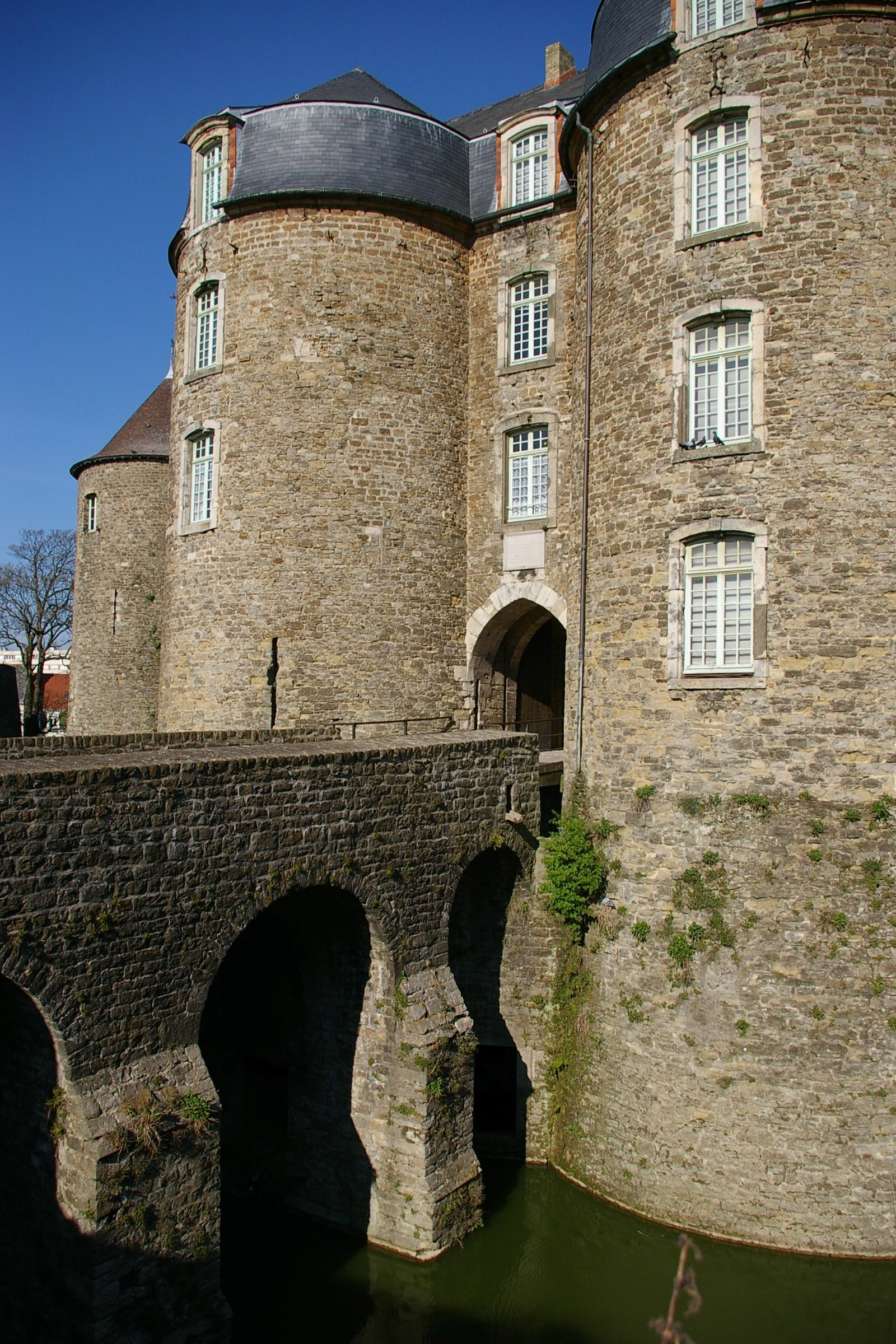
Entrance to Boulogne's castle and museum

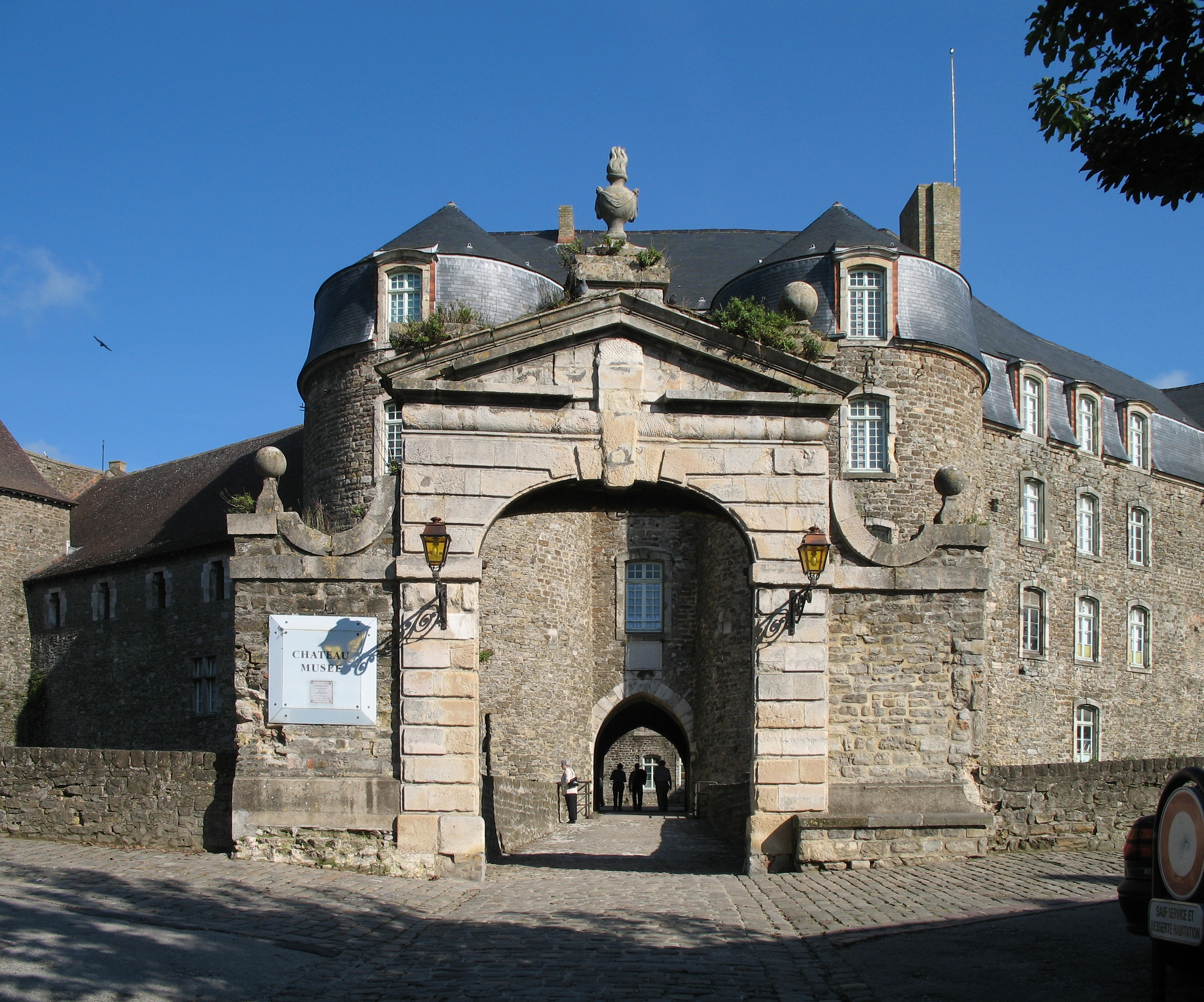
Another view of the entrance

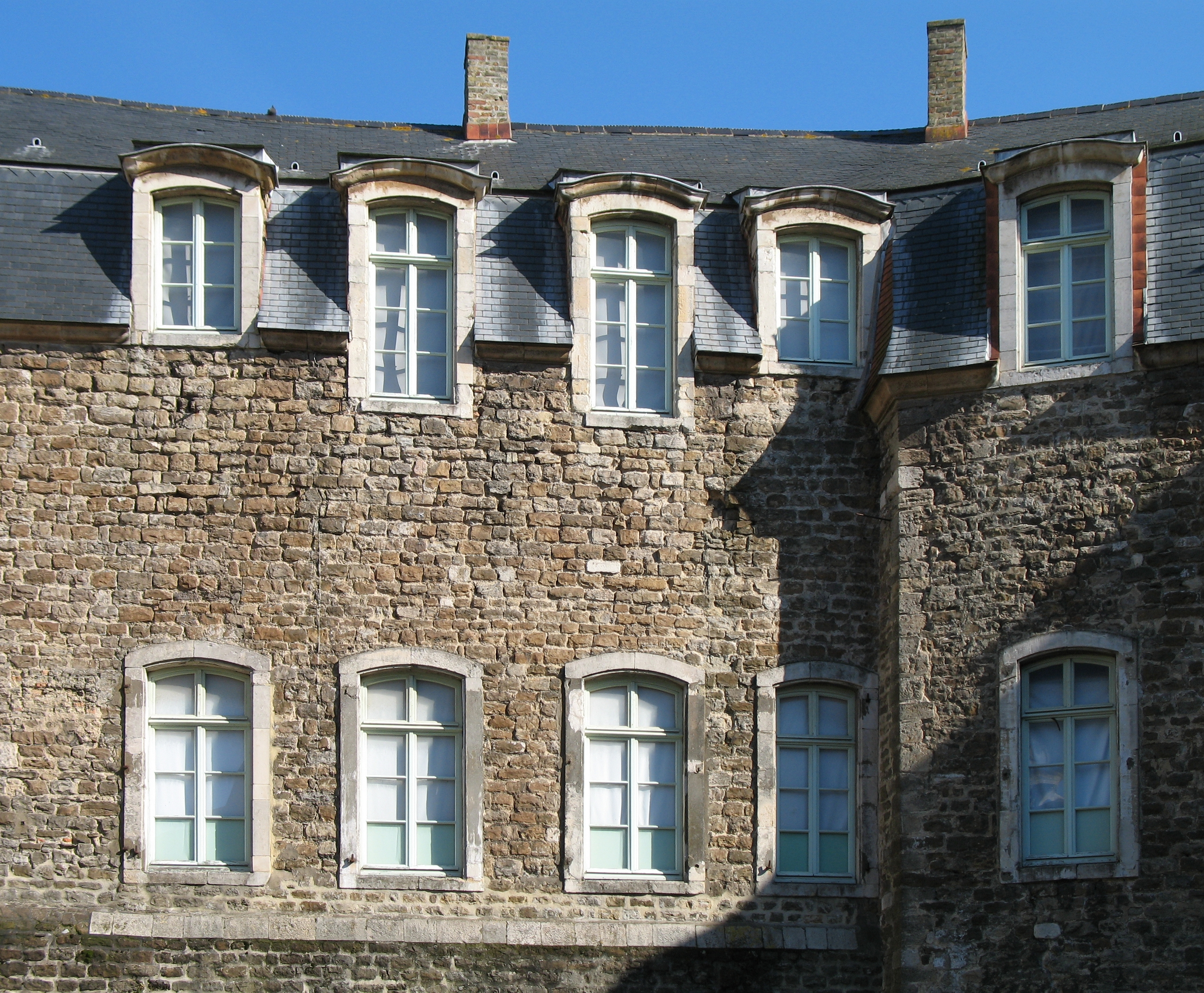
Detail of the inner court

The Château de Boulogne-sur-Mer (French pronunciation: [ʃato də bulɔɲ syʁ mɛʁ]) is a castle in the French seaport of Boulogne-sur-Mer, in the Pas-de-Calais département. It houses the Boulogne museum.

== History ==
The castle was built in the 13th century by Philippe Hurepel (1180–1234), count of Boulogne and son of Philip II of France. Following the death of his half-brother, king Louis VIII after a short three-year reign, Hurepel was one of the leaders of a rebellion against the regent, Blanche de Castille, mother of the minor Louis IX. He constructed castles at Calais and Hardelot and refortified Boulogne. The castle is built in the eastern corner of the medieval walls surrounding the Haute Ville (literally, high town - the part of Bologne on the hill). The walls themselves were reconstructed by Hurepel. The eastern part of the castle was built over a corner of the Roman wall, parts of which are still visible in the basement. Housing together the political, legal and economic powers of the time, it was also a residential and defensive site.

Various modifications have taken place. Major alterations were carried out by the duc de Berry between 1394 and 1416. The horse shoe shape (barracks, arsenal) was completed around 1567. After being adapted because of developments in artillery during the 16th century, it lost some of its medieval character. In 1767, it became a barracks and, after World War II, it also housed a prison. In 1974, the town council took over ownership of the castle and decided to install its museum collections.

Unlike many other contemporary castles of the early 13th century, the plan of the castle does not include a keep. The remains of Château de Hardelot in nearby Condette show that Hurepel used this design for at least one other castle. A similar castle was built around the same time at Fère-en-Tardenois by the Counts of Dreux. The Château de Boulogne is listed by the French Ministry of Culture as a monument historique.

== Architectural Description ==
The Château de Boulogne-sur-Mer is built on a flat terrain and falls under the category of court castles. With its polygonal plan, it is part of the fortified city of Boulogne-sur-Mer and occupies a part of its rectangular urban enclosure. The castle has its own moat, which was once filled with water, and is therefore isolated from the previously mentioned fortified enclosure of the city. It is accessible from both the outside as well as from the castle courtyard. The large gateway to the city is still used today and is located between two cylindrical towers. On the opposite side, a postern gate allowed an exit to the fields back when the castle was built.

The castle, while not equipped of a keep, reinforces the eastern side of the ramparts. With its nine cylindrical towers joined by curtain walls, its shape resembles an irregular polygon. It is believed that originally, the towers and curtain walls were surmounted by hoardings.

The buildings are located against the towers and curtain walls and enclose the central courtyard of the castle. After passing the main entrance, which has lost its original drawbridge, the first building on the left is what was the state room back when the castle was built, then follow the chapel, the armoury, the lodgings, and the kitchens. Today, the buildings and the rooms within them have been adapted to host the Château-musée de Boulogne-sur-Mer.

In the sixteenth century, on the eastern side of the castle, the walls were embedded in thick stone masonry in order to form a shielding plate, and faussebrayes were built to encompass five of the nine towers under an almost continuous roof in order to protect the castle from the ever advancing artillery at the time. The first tower on the left is the only one that has kept its original aspect. It is pierced by three levels of arrowslits constructed in staggered rows and covered with a conical roof (toit en poivrière in French). The following tower, located next to the chapel, contains the treasure chamber.

The basements, which go all the way around the fortress, are designed with barrel vaults. Of all the underground rooms, the room known as the "Barbière" is by far the most remarkable of them all. It was used as a gunpowder magazine and was most likely given its name in honour of Saint Barbara, the patron saint of artillerymen.

== See also ==
- List of castles in France

== Sources ==
- POIRET, Françoise Camille: "Château-musée de Boulogne-sur-Mer : Guide de visite", 1998
- Salch, Charles-Laurent (1979). Dictionnaire des châteaux et des fortifications du moyen âge en France. Strasbourg: Publitotal. pp. 1287 pp. ISBN 2-86535-070-3.
- Mesqui, Jean (1997). Chateaux-forts et fortifications en France. Paris: Flammarion. pp. 493 pp. ISBN 2-08-012271-1.
