= Université d'été de Boulogne-sur-Mer =

Summer university in France

Coordinates: 50.72393°N 1.60834°E

Universite d'ete de Boulogne-sur-Mer
- Motto: Apprendre le français par plaisir
- Established: 1951
- President: Dany Accary
- Location: Boulogne-sur-Mer, France
- Website: www.uebm.org

The Université d'été de Boulogne-sur-Mer is a summer university at Boulogne-sur-Mer, Pas de Calais, France.
