= Henri Malo =

French writer

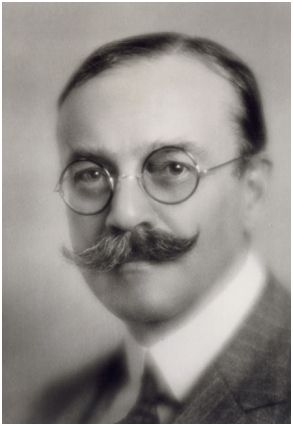
Henri Malo

Henri Malo (4 March 1868 in Boulogne-sur-Mer) – 17 March 1948 in Chantilly. was a French writer.

He was the auditor of the École Nationale des Chartes, he was librarian at the Thiers library in Paris, then assistant curator at the Musée Condé, Chantilly from 1931 until his death.

A street in Boulogne-sur-mer bears his name.

== Works ==
- Les annees de boheme de la Duchesse d'Abrantes 1927 Editions Emile Paul Freres
- The Corsairs. Dunkirk privateers and Jean Bart, Paris, Mercure de France, 1912
- Our three northern ports. Dunkirk, Calais, Boulogne, Paris, Wiley, 1920.
- Corsairs: memoirs and unpublished documents.
- The Tender Love of Don Luis, Paris, Editions Bernard Grasset, 1924.
- The beautiful Montrond, Paris, Editions Emile-Paul Freres, 1926.
- Jean Bart, Paris, The Renaissance Book Publishing, 1929, collection, The Great legend of the sea.
- The Château de Chantilly, Paris, Calmann-Levy, 1938
- Police intervenes, 1790-1850, St. Wandrille, Fontenelle Publishing, 1946.
- The Bourdon of Notre Dame, Toulouse, Editions Privat
