= Hôtel de Ville, Boulogne-sur-Mer =

Town hall in Boulogne-sur-Mer, France

Hôtel de Ville
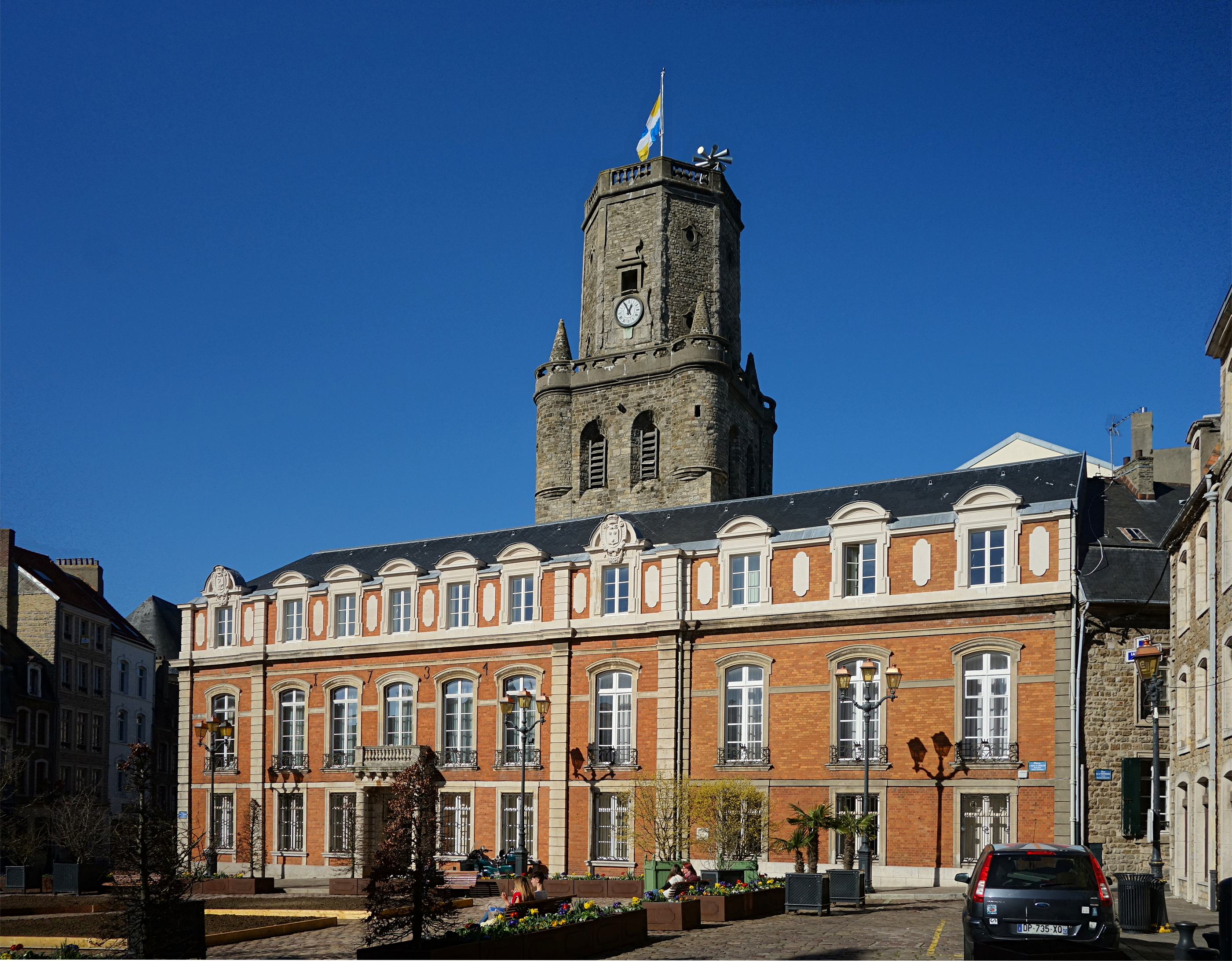
- The main frontage of the Hôtel de Ville, with the belfry behind, in February 2019

General information
- Type: City hall
- Architectural style: Neoclassical style
- Location: Boulogne-sur-Mer, France
- Coordinates: 50.7253°N 1.6133°E
- Completed: c.1736

Design and construction
- Architects: Etienne Martinet

UNESCO World Heritage Site
- Part of: Belfries of Belgium and France
- Criteria: Cultural: ii, iv
- Reference: 943
- Inscription: 1999 (23rd Session)

The Hôtel de Ville (French pronunciation: [otɛl də vil], City Hall) is a municipal building in Boulogne-sur-Mer, Pas-de-Calais, in northern France, standing on Place Godefroy de Bouillon. It has been included on the Inventaire général des monuments by the French Ministry of Culture since 1982.

== History ==
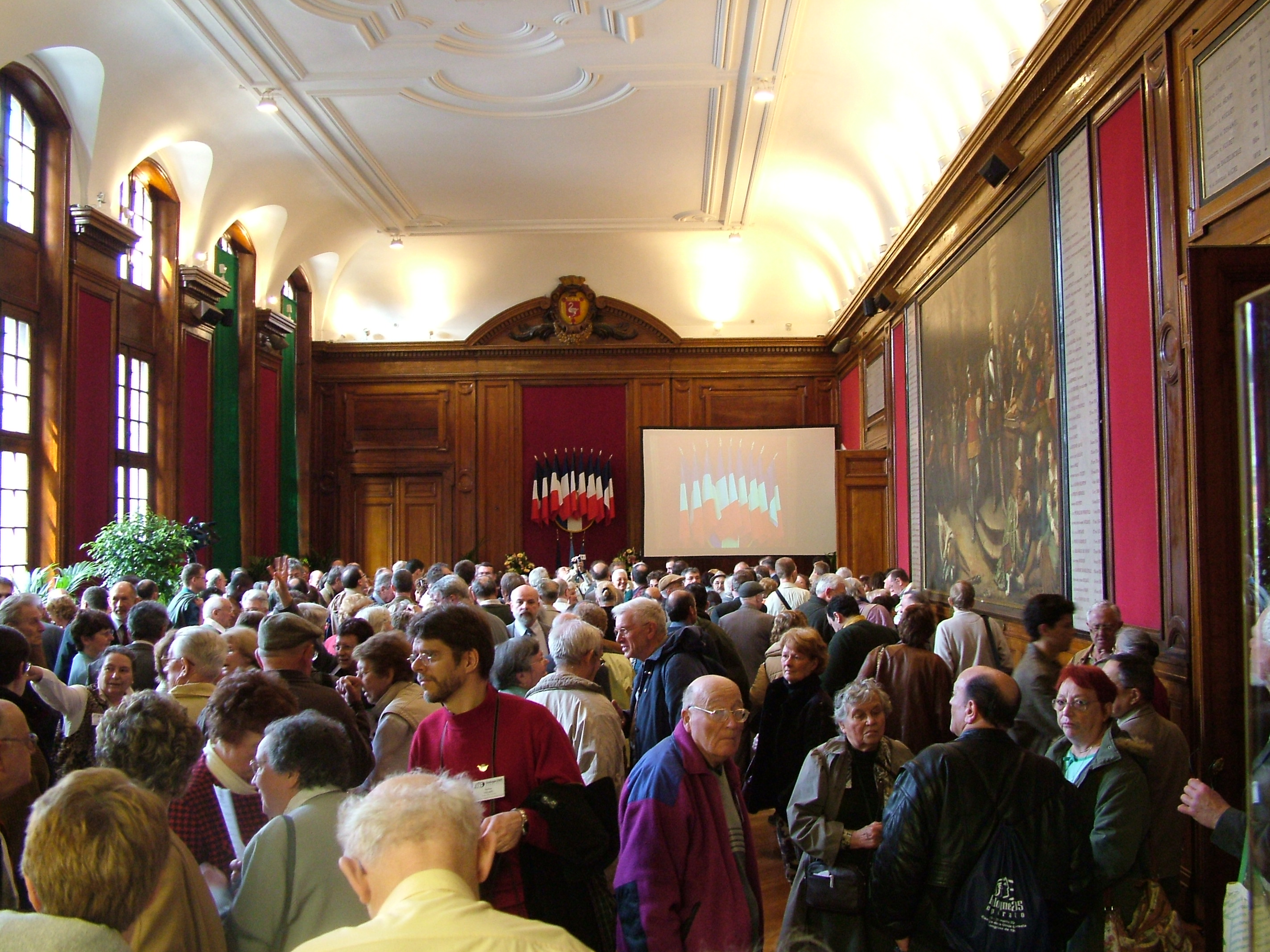
The Salle des Fêtes

The oldest part of the complex is the belfry which was commissioned by Renaud I, Count of Dammartin in the late 12th century. It formed part of the residence of the Counts of Boulogne and, along with other belfries of Belgium and France, it was recognised by UNESCO as a World Heritage Site in 2005. It originally featured a spire but this was burnt down in 1712 and replaced by an octagonal tower, designed by Etienne Martinet, in 1734.

After Boulogne became part of the royal domain in the late 15th century, the residence of the Counts of Boulogne was used for municipal purposes as a town hall. In the early 1730s, after the old town hall had become dilapidated, the consuls decided to commission a new building. The foundation stone was laid by the mayor, Achille Mutinot, on 7 April 1734. It was designed by Etienne Martinet in the neoclassical style, built in red brick with stone dressings and was completed in around 1736. The original design involved a main frontage of just six bays facing onto Place Godefroy de Bouillon (the first six bays on the left of the current frontage). It was a two-storey structure with just one main floor and a large attic. Internally, the principal rooms were the Bureau du Maire (mayor's parlour) and the Salle des Gouverneurs (governors' room), which was decorated in the Rococo style with portraits of Antoine d'Aumont, 1st Duke of Aumont and his five successors, who served as governors of the town.

The building was extended to the northeast by one extra bay to a design by Albert Debayser between 1854 and 1857. A porch, formed by a pair of Doric order columns supporting an entablature and a balustraded balcony, was added as part of these works to give the building a more symmetrical appearance. An additional floor was added and moulded surrounds were placed on the windows at the same time. A painting by the artist, François Schommer, was unveiled in the town hall to commemorate the visit of the President of France, Sadi Carnot, to Boulogne in 1889.

A further extension creating an east wing, with three new bays at the front, was erected to a design by Pierre Drobecq and officially opened by the mayor, Edmond Warluzel, in October 1934. New rooms on the first floor of the east wing included the Salle du Conseil (council chamber) and the Salle des Fêtes (ballroom), which was decorated with a painting by Claudius Jacquand depicting the mayor, Antoine Eurvin, refusing to surrender to the English troops of Henry VIII during the siege of Boulogne in 1544.

Following the liberation of the town by the 3rd Canadian Division on 22 September 1944, as part of Operation Wellhit during the Second World War, General Charles de Gaulle was welcomed at the town hall by the mayor, Henri Henneguelle, in August 1945. A painting by the artist, Georges Mathieu, entitled "Bataille de Tibériade" (Battle of Tiberias) was unveiled on the first floor of the building in 1957. On a return visit as President of France in September 1959, de Gaulle again went inside the town hall.
