= Boulogne-Maritime station =

Railway station in Boulogne-sur-Mer, France

Coordinates: 50°43′34″N 1°35′49″E

Boulogne-Maritime
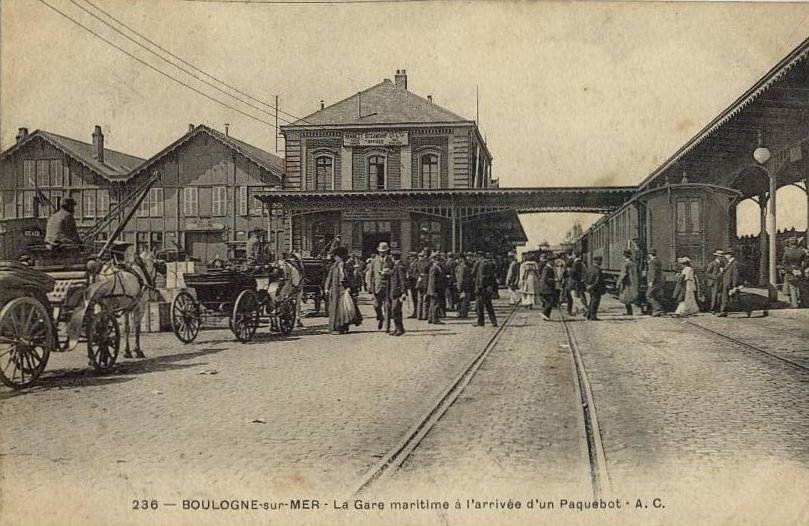
- The station, c. 1900

General information
- Location: Boulogne-sur-Mer; France

Passengers
- 1938: 563,000
Location

Boulogne-Maritime was a former railway station and port in Boulogne-sur-Mer, France. Ferries between England and France used the terminal. The Station was the second most important passenger port of France (after Marseille), seeing 563,000 passengers use the facility in 1938. Following World War II, traffic with England was restored in 1947.

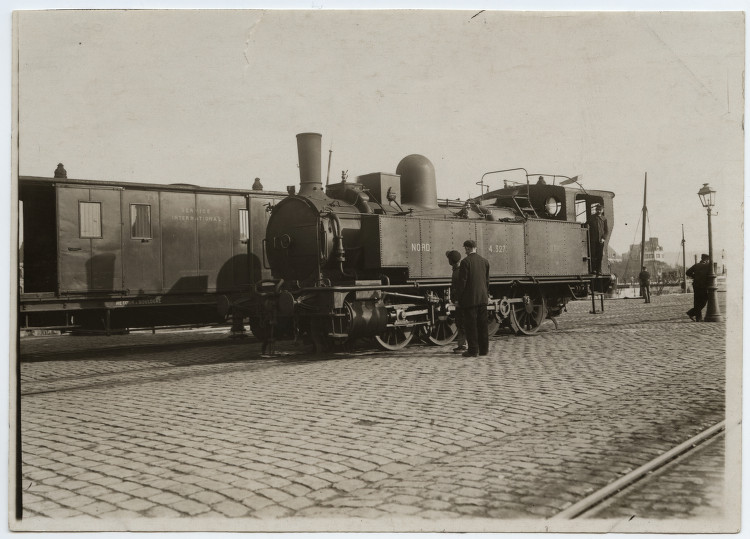
A tank engine sits at the station during a railway strike in 1920.

In June 1952 a new ferry terminal was opened, located on the site of the previous one established in 1875. The modern redesign of the terminal allowed boarding of cars onto the boats heading for England.

The station saw intense activity even in the 1990s. As of 2012, the site "is at the heart of a vast urban redefinition project". Since the station closed, it has been used for various cultural functions, such as a mobile museum (the Centre Pompidou mobile) from June to September 2012.
