= Calais station =

Calais station may refer to:

- Calais-Fréthun station, an international railway station in the suburbs of Calais, France
- Calais-Maritime, a former railway station in the Port of Calais, France
- Calais-Ville station, a railway station in the city centre of Calais, France
- Les Fontinettes station, a junction railway station in the suburbs of Calais, France
