= Steenwerck =

- Commune
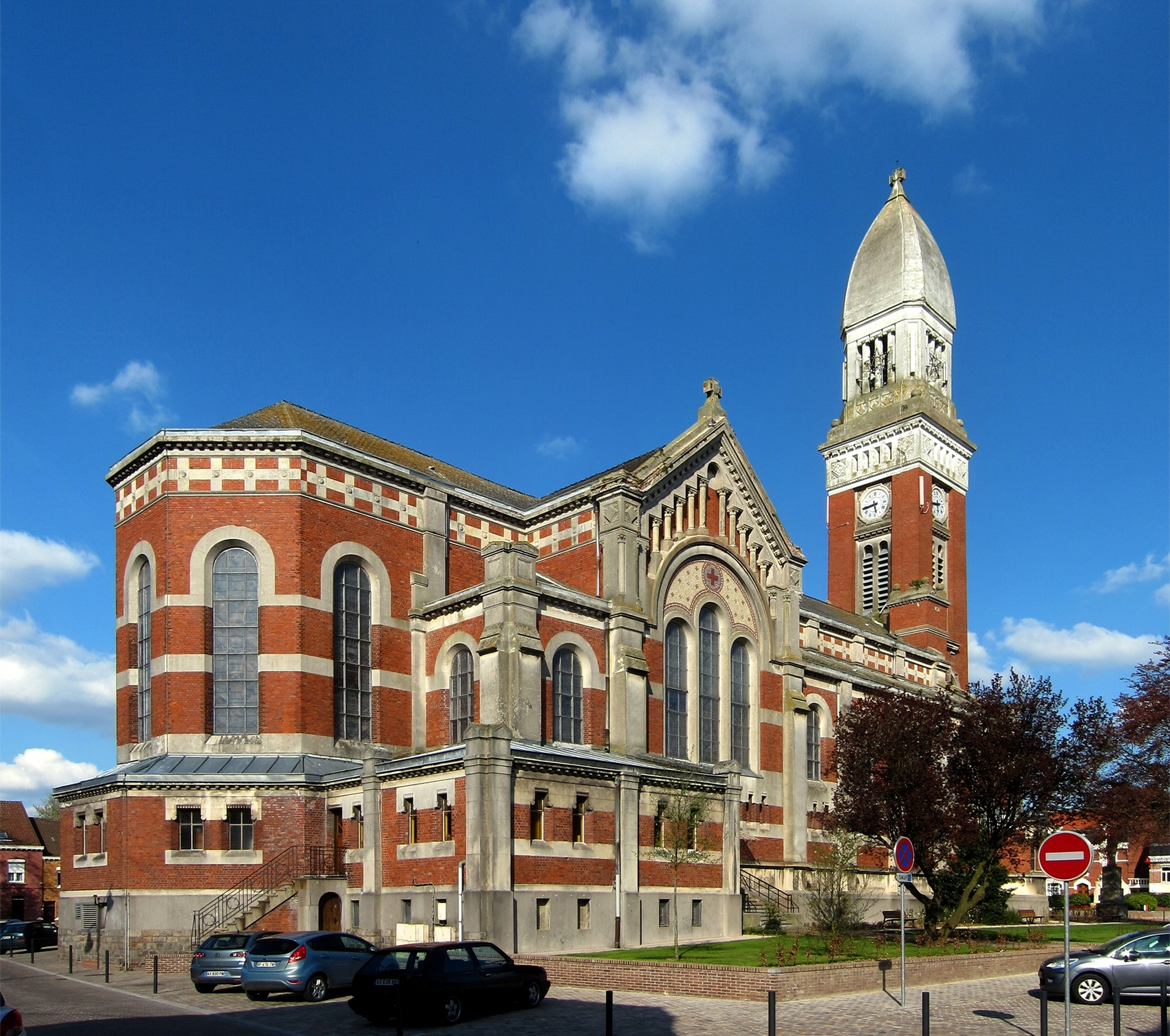
- The church in Steenwerck

- Coat of arms
- Location of Steenwerck
- Location within France Location within Hauts-de-France
- Coordinates: 50°42′04″N 2°46′42″E
- Country: France
- Region: Hauts-de-France
- Department: Nord
- Arrondissement: Dunkerque
- Canton: Bailleul
- Intercommunality: CA Cœur de Flandre

Government
  - Mayor (2020–2026): Joël Devos
- Area^{1}: 27.47 km^{2} (10.61 sq mi)
- Elevation: 16 m (52 ft)
- Highest elevation: 19 m (62 ft)
- Lowest elevation: 13 m (43 ft)
- Population (2023): 3,450
  - Density: 126/km^{2} (325/sq mi)
- Time zone: UTC+01:00 (CET)
  - Summer (DST): UTC+02:00 (CEST)
- INSEE/Postal code: 59581 /59181
- ^{1} French Land Register data, which excludes lakes, ponds, glaciers > 1 km^{2} (0.386 sq mi or 247 acres) and river estuaries.

Steenwerck (French pronunciation: [stɛ̃vɛʁk]; Dutch: Steenwerk) is a commune, in French Flanders, in the Nord department in northern France. It is located about 25 km (16 mi) north of Lille. People from Steenwerck are known as Steenwerckois.

It is home to Steenwerck's 100 km à pied race event, which mainly features a 100 km (62 mi) marathon, although most local residents prefer to merely walk one lap (roughly 22 kilometres (14 mi)).

Steenwerck also has its own festival giant, as is the tradition in the Nord Department, which is named Totor and is one of the tallest, measuring 5.70 m (18.7 ft).

Other places of interest include the Museum of Rural Life as well as three Commonwealth war cemeteries, and a German war cemetery, of the First World War.

== Population ==
Historical population
Year	Pop.	±% p.a.
1968	3,172	—
1975	2,990	−0.84%
1982	3,084	+0.44%
1990	3,085	+0.00%
1999	3,263	+0.63%
2007	3,391	+0.48%
2012	3,482	+0.53%
2017	3,673	+1.07%
2023	3,450	−1.04%
Source: INSEE

== Heraldry ==
Arms of Steenwerck	The arms of Steenwerck are blazoned: Gules, a cross indented argent. (Estourmel and Steenwerck use the same arms.)

== History ==
Steenwerck was created by the Franks. The first mention in the 12th century – in 1160 with the invasion by La Becque, from Saint-Jans-Cappel.

Commerce was originally started by the town's founder, la Becque, who built canals with locks right up to Lys. The local weavers were able to deliver their bolts of cloth to the port situated in the town centre from where they would be sent on to the clothes manufacturing town of Armentièrs. The boats used were called martsheps, that is, 'market boats', which were flat bottomed boats. It was by using these boats that local farmers were able to deliver their produce to the neighbouring towns. Boats of this type were used right up until the middle of the 19th century.

== Etymology and evolution of the name ==
Through the course of history, several variations have appeared: for the period when Middle Dutch was spoken (1150 - 1550) one would see:

- In 1160: Steinwerc
- In 1182: Estenwerck
- In 1260: Stuuinwercke
- In 1331: Steinwerck
- In 1332: Steenwerc

Then in various documents, the name became Stewerc.

In modern Dutch

steen means stone

werk means work, construction

== Transportation ==
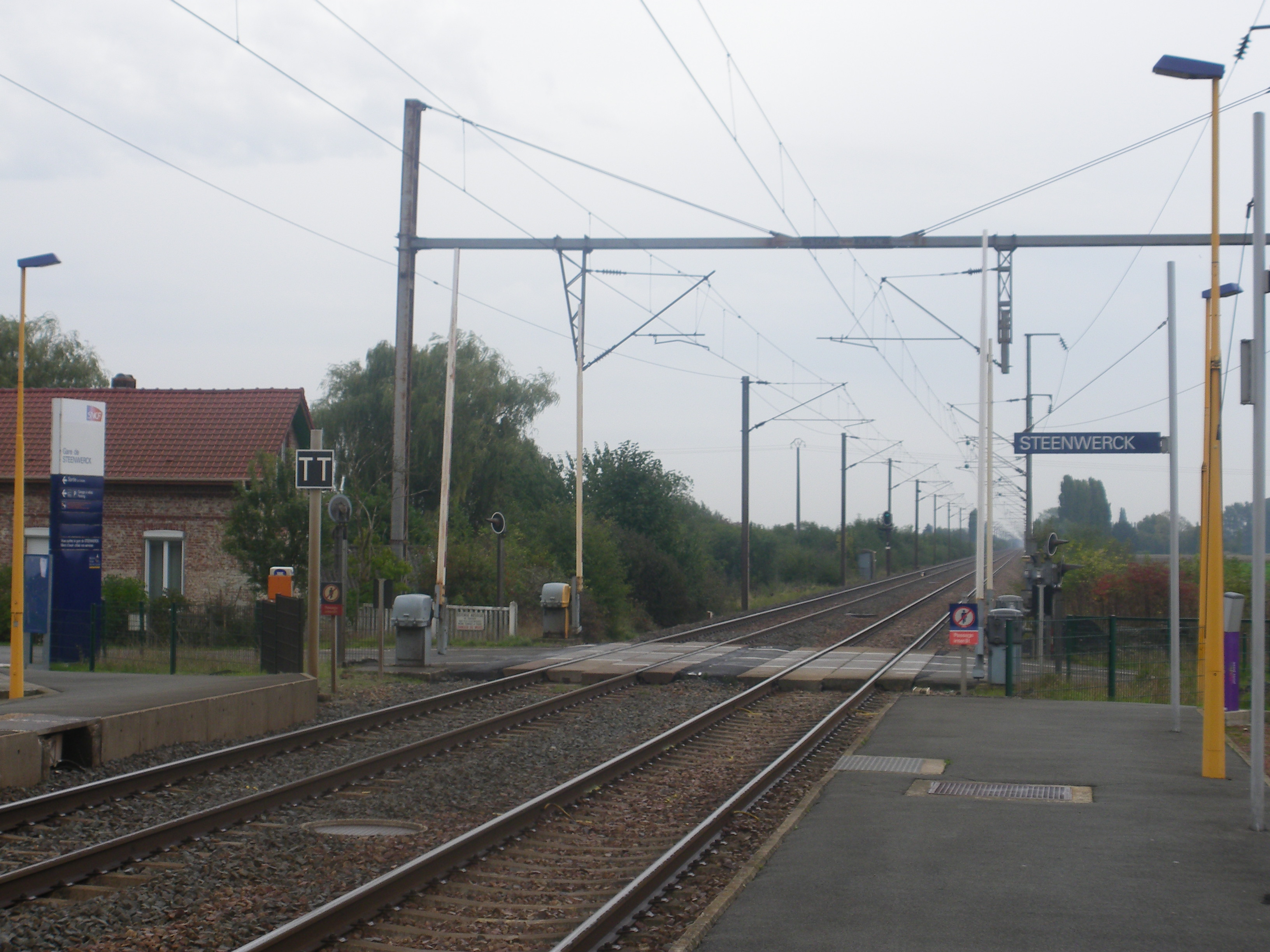
Steenwerck station

Steenwerck is between Calais and Lille and very close to the Belgian border. It is well-served by road from both cities via the A25 road. Steenwerck is on the Calais Ville section of the Lille-Fontinettes railway to Lille Flanders station.

== Culture and heritage ==
=== Museums ===
==== The Museum of Rural Life ====
Built in the central courtyard of an old farm at the start of the 18th century, it shows the activities and trades of a typical Flemish village from 1850 to 1950. With more than 1500 square metres of exhibition space and including more than 6000 objects which bear witness to rural life, the museum allows visitors to rediscover daily life on a farm from that era.

Exhibits show the barn, the granary, the stables, barn, vegetable garden, orchard, pasture, stables, the arboretum. Exhibits to do with the house itself include the kitchen, bedroom, lounge, the bakery, laundry, and the cellar.

Village life is depicted with shops - a tavern, a grocer's, a hatter's, a bakery, a butcher's, a cobbler's, the apothecary, the basket maker, and a hairdresser. There is a school and several businesses including a thatcher, carder, saddler, carpenter, cooper, wheelwright, blacksmith and beekeeper.

==== The Organ Farm ====
This museum presents a collection of mechanical instruments, mechanical organs, music boxes, phonographs and mechanical pianos. There is also a mechanical violin, of which only a few remain in the world.

=== Folk music, dance and celebration ===
==== Totor: the festival giant ====
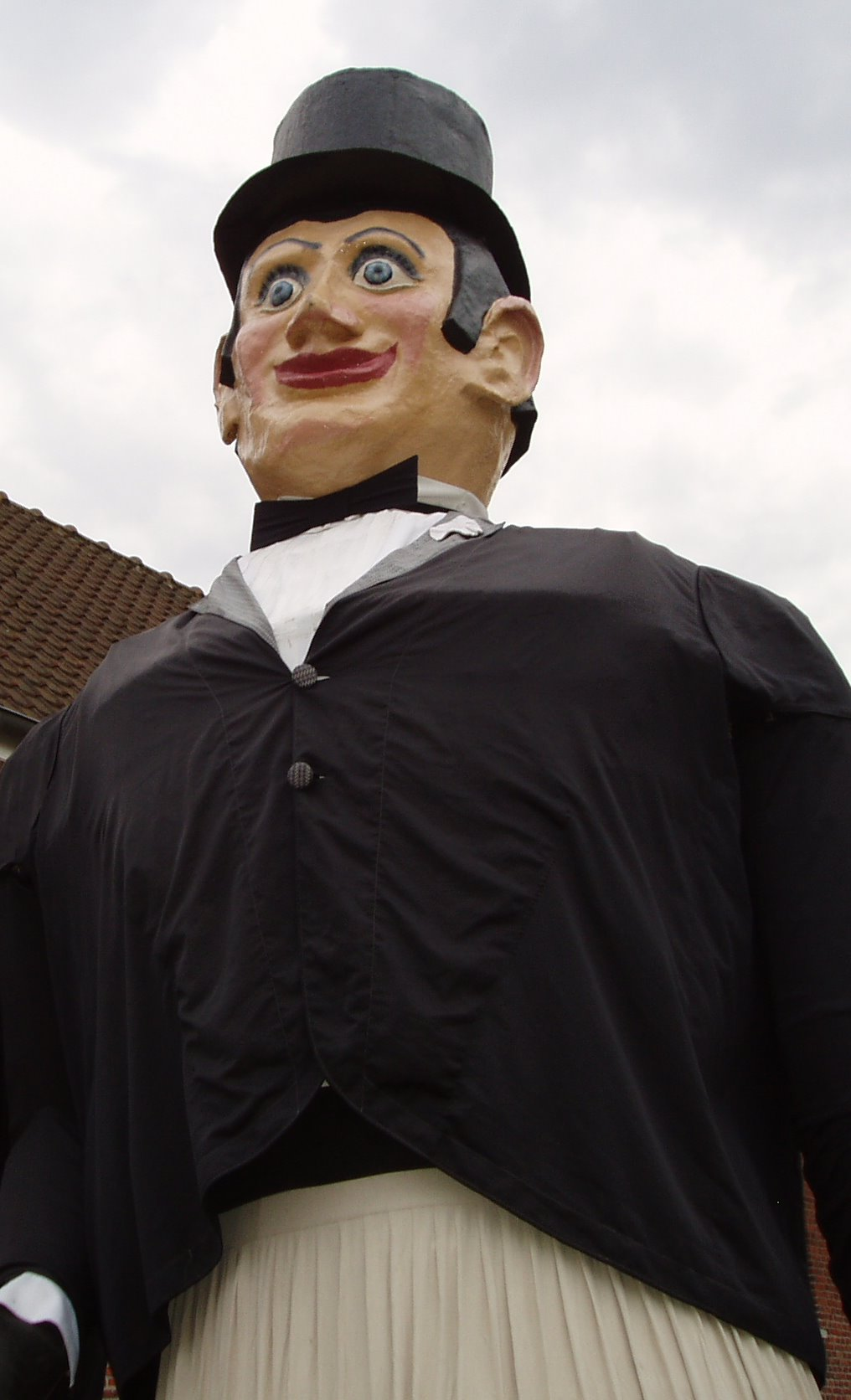
Totor with his trade-mark top-hat, bow-tie and black dinner jacket

Totor is a processional giant, inaugurated first in 1933, and used on various feast days. His body was made of wood having been made by the local carpenter and cooper; the papier-mâché head was bought in Lille and brought to Steenwerck by bicycle. He measured 4.75 m (15.6 ft) and weighed 60 kg (130 lb). Unfortunately, he disappeared during the Second World War.

Another, much smaller one was made in 1947, but with the public celebration of feast days on the wane, this giant didn't last the humid conditions of storage. Since then, however, two more Totors have been made, one in 1978 and, the one in current use, in 2006. These two are identical to each other in design and measure 5.70 m (18.7 ft), with a weight of 120 kg (260 lb) clothed.

==== Vonchelle: traditional music and dance ====
In the northern French dialect spoken in Steenwerck "Vonchelle" is a bindweed, a plant which typifies the Flanders volunteer, in that it has very deep roots. Because of this the name has been given to a group which performs traditional dances music at Steenwerck.

The group Vonchelle started in September 1981. Initially it only focused on getting to know and teaching traditional Flemish dances, but a decade later a band was formed and Vonchelle is now involved fully in the Folk circuit.

Their repertoire includes quadrilles, rounds, schottisches, polkas, and waltzes. They also perform from a traditional Flemish heritage, with some borrowings from the Irish repertoire, for example, jigs, circles, and so on, or the centre of France, for example, bourées.

The instruments they use are quite a collection. They have bagpipes, flutes, tin whistles, clarinets, Irish spoons, flutes, violins, guitars, harmonicas, mandolins, derbouhas, bodhrans and accordions.

=== Architectural heritage ===
==== The Church of St John the Baptist ====
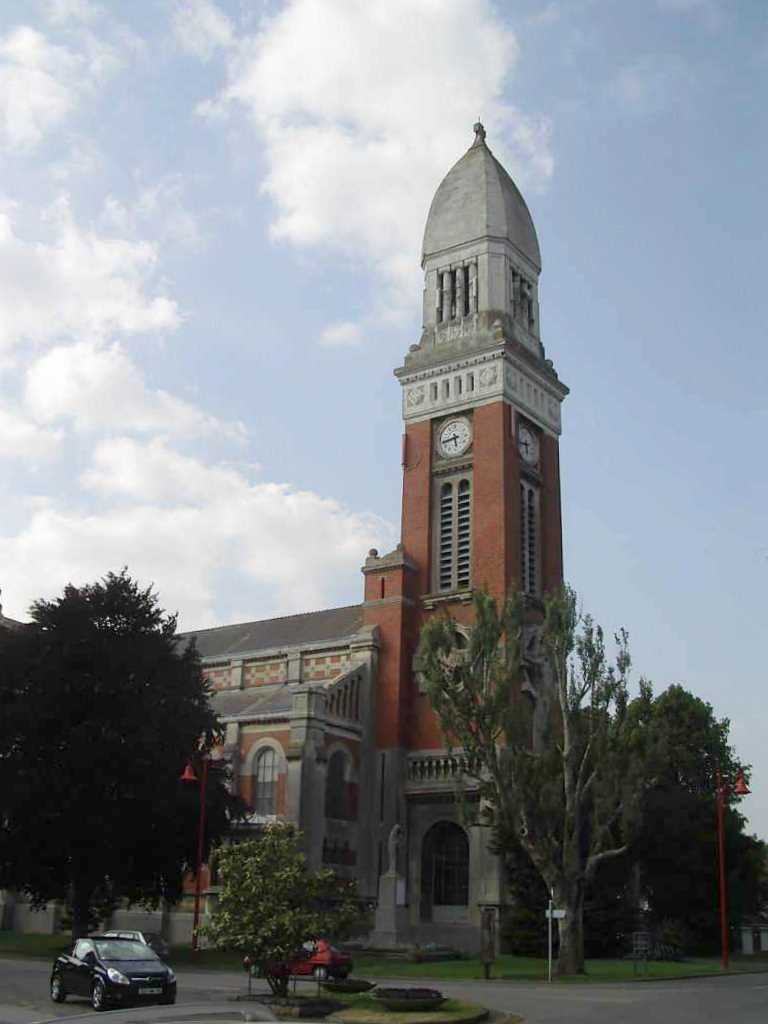
The Church of St John the Baptist at Steenwerck

The Church of St John the Baptist is located on the site of a Roman temple, and was mentioned in 1182. It holds a baptismal font from 1587. The church was destroyed during the First World War, but was rebuilt in 1923 to the design of Armand Lemay, an architect from Lille. It consists of a nave and two aisles. In the choir, the stained glass windows of Pierre Turpin, master glass lillois retrace the life of St. John the Baptist. A 1/50 scale model of the church can be seen inside the church which was made in 1951.

=== The Church of Our Lady of Sorrows ===
As early as 1850, the inhabitants of the hamlet of La Croix du Bac, which is included as a part of Steenwerck, but is just over a mile down the road, had designed a project to build a church, despite opposition from the parish priest of Steenwerck, as well as from the town council and local merchants. A plot of land was offered by Mr. Amand Chieux. Some residents of La Croix du Bac gave money, others gave their labour and materials: and, so the Church of Our Lady of Sorrows was built.

When the church was complete, the people asked the diocese for a priest, but the bishop, knowing of local opposition from Steenwerck, refused. So, the people threatened to seek a Protestant pastor, but before a schism could begin the bishop changed his mind and created a new parish, on 26 January 1870, with its own parish priest, Abbé Leleu.

The interior of the church is decorated with 27 devotional statues of popular saints. Because of this, the church is also called "the reliquary of popular devotion".

==== Wayside chapels ====
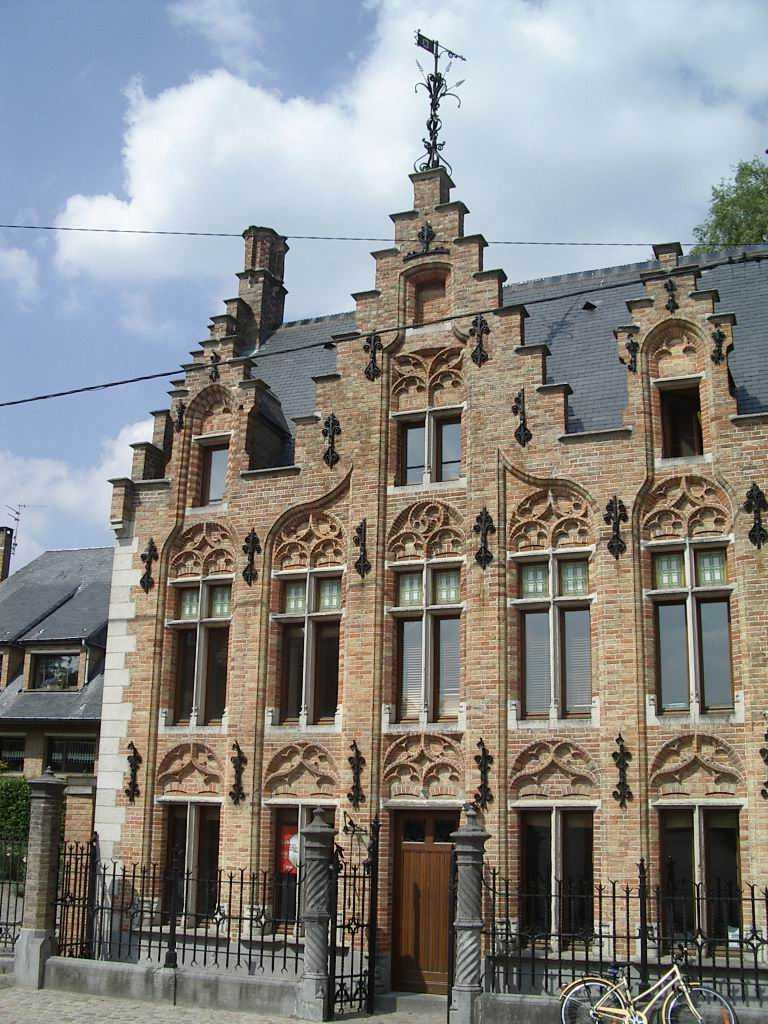
The Flemish house

As in much of France, wayside shrines and chapels can be seen in and around Steenwerck. Each chapel is a small building with a roof and is designed as a place for people to pray as they pass by. There are 25 chapels scattered around both the town and the hamlet of Steenwerck, "Croix du Bac." The oldest chapel is from the 16th century and the most recent is the chapel of St. Rita, erected in 1979.

==== The Flemish house ====
The Flemish house was built, in 1890, on the initiative of Pierre Dutrie, in the Gothic Revival style, because of his love of the city of Bruges where he had two friends. He employed the Bruges architect Stephen Timmery, who was known for restoring the monuments of Bruges, to draw the plans and manage the building of the house. All the craftsmen working for the building: bricklayers, stonemasons, carpenters came from this Belgian city.

It was on the death of his mother, in 1982, that her son André Dutrie donated the house to the town for one symbolic franc. It was then made into a museum.

The facade became worn over the years, but it was fully restored in 1994. The interior was completed in late 1999. It has been registered as a historical monument since 1980.

== The Pavillon des Iris ==
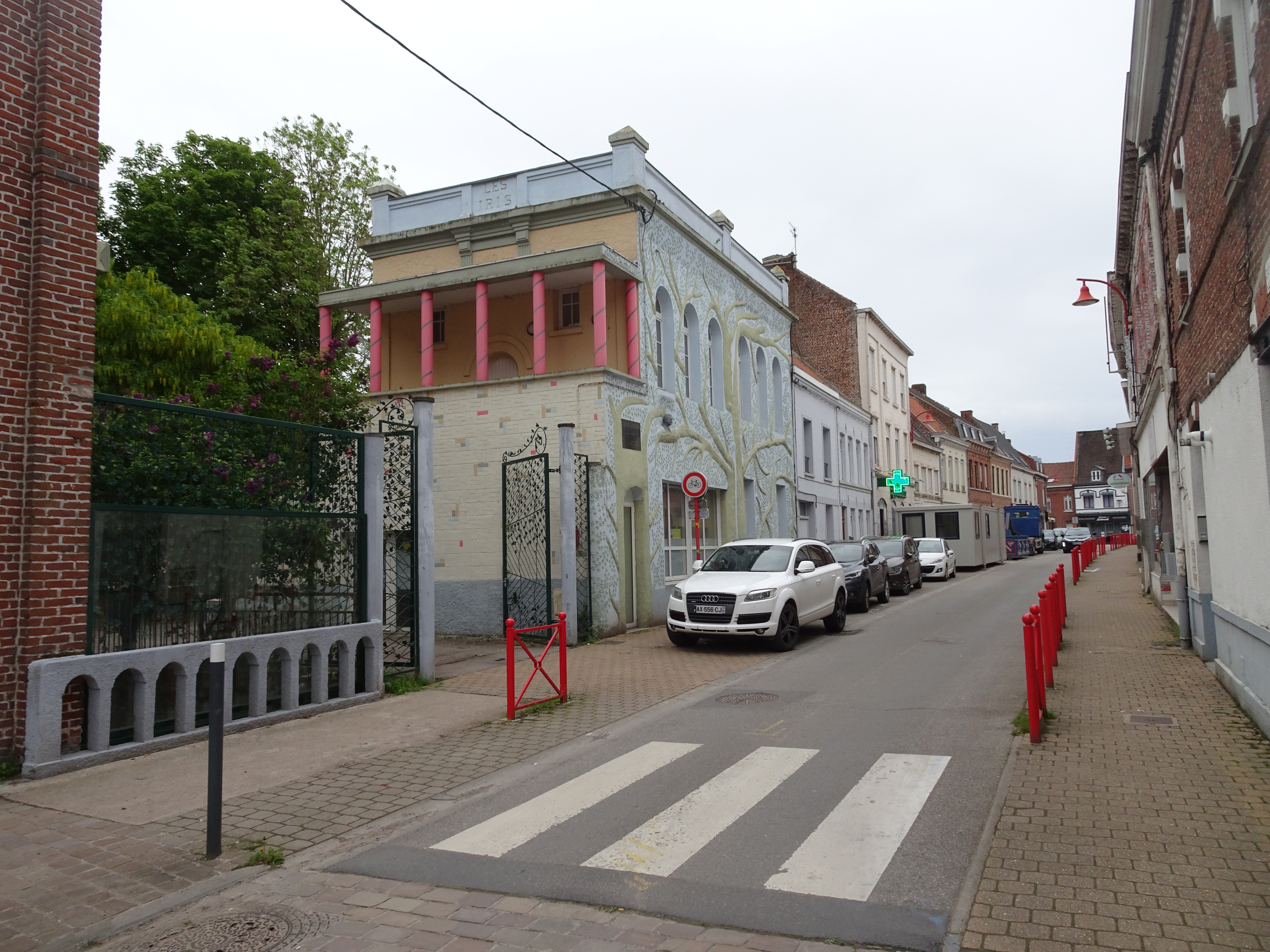
Tourist information Lys Valley

The Pavillon des Iris was successively housing, commerce, industry and convalescent home, it currently houses the office of Tourist information Lys Valley. The pastel-colored facade is adorned with a tree running the entire length of the elevation

== Twinning ==
- Hemer, Germany, since 1967

== See also ==
- Communes of the Nord department
