= Caffiers station =

French railway station

Caffiers
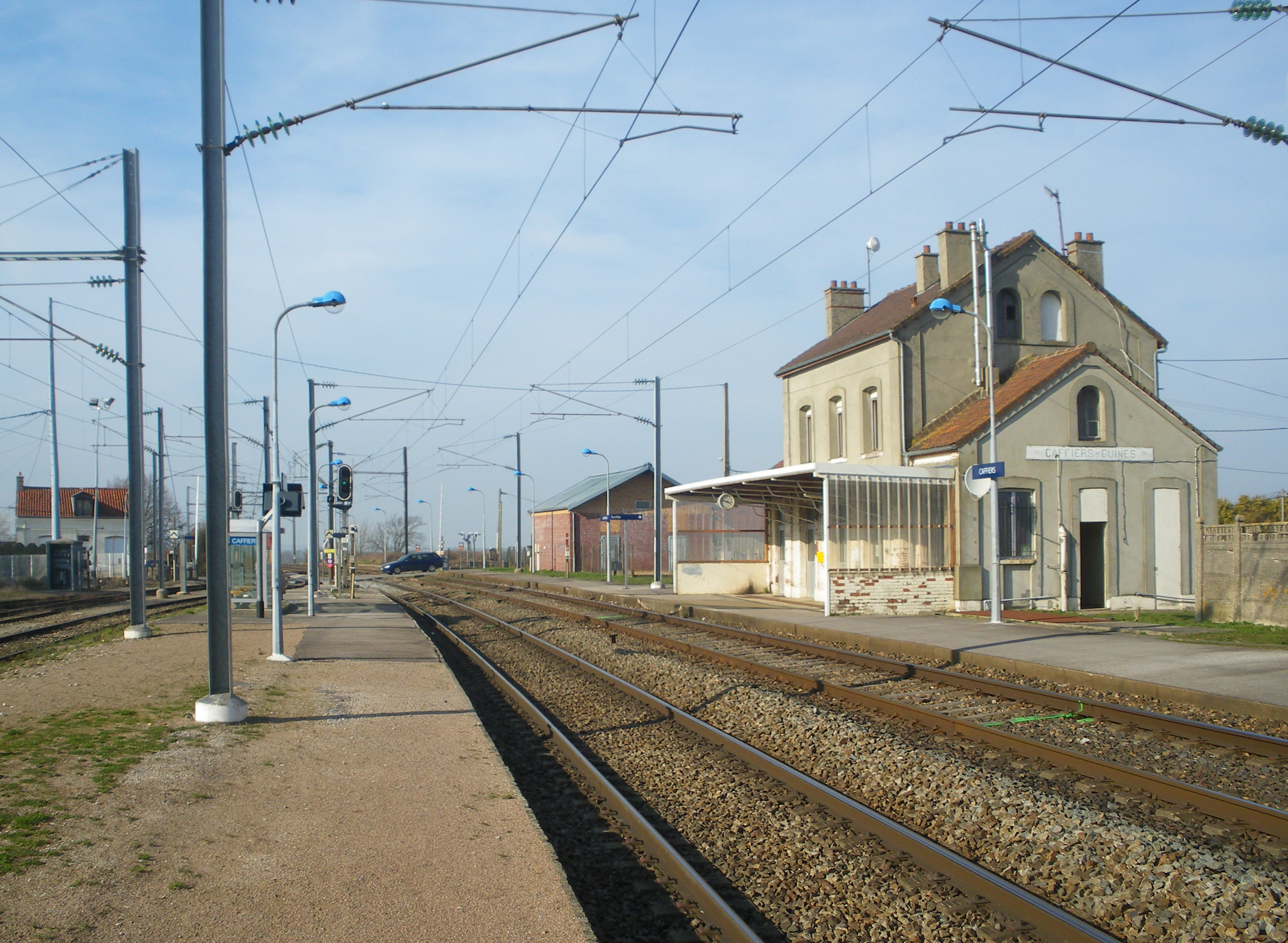
- Station building and platforms

General information
- Location: Caffiers, Pas-de-Calais, France
- Coordinates: 50.849682°N 1.812335°E
- Line: Boulogne-Calais railway

Other information
- Station code: 87317321

Services
| Preceding station | TER Hauts-de-France | Following station |
|---|---|---|
| Le Haut-Banc towards Rang-du-Fliers | Proxi P73 | Pihen towards Calais |
Location

Caffiers is a railway station near the village Caffiers, Pas-de-Calais, northern France. It is located on the Boulogne–Calais railway and served by the SNCF local TER Hauts-de-France.

== TER ==
TER Hauts-de-France services run southwards to Boulogne-Ville and northwards to Calais-Ville.
