= Pihen station =

Railway station in Pihen-lès-Guînes, France

Coordinates: 50°52′23″N 1°47′8″E

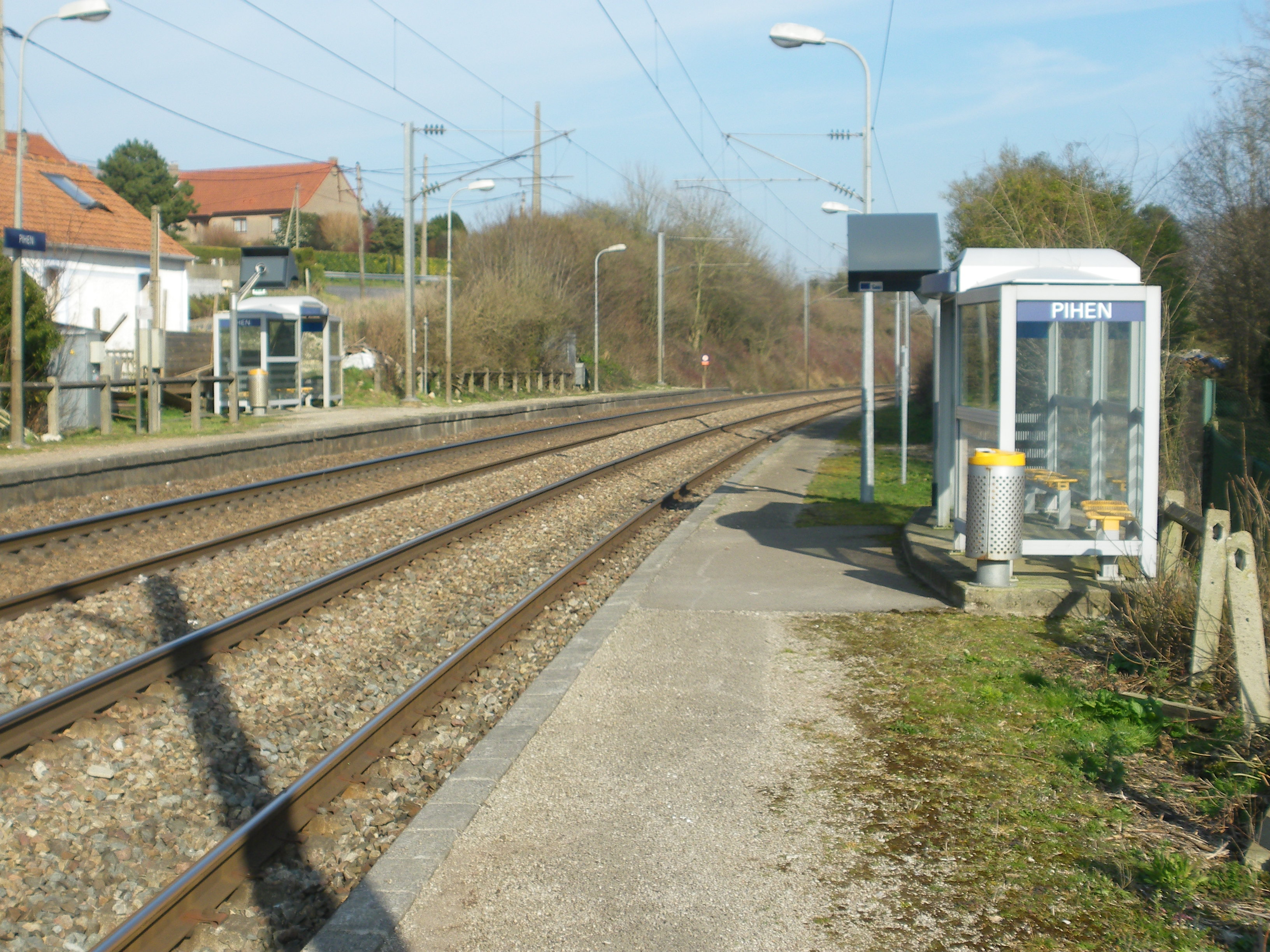
Tracks, platforms and shelters

Pihen is a railway station in Pihen-lès-Guînes, northern France. It is served by the TER Hauts-de-France line between Calais and Rang-du-Fliers.

Preceding station	TER Hauts-de-France	Following station
Caffiers towards Rang-du-Fliers	Proxi P73	Calais-Fréthun towards Calais
