= Le Haut-Banc station =

French railway station

Coordinates: 50°48′58″N 1°46′16″E

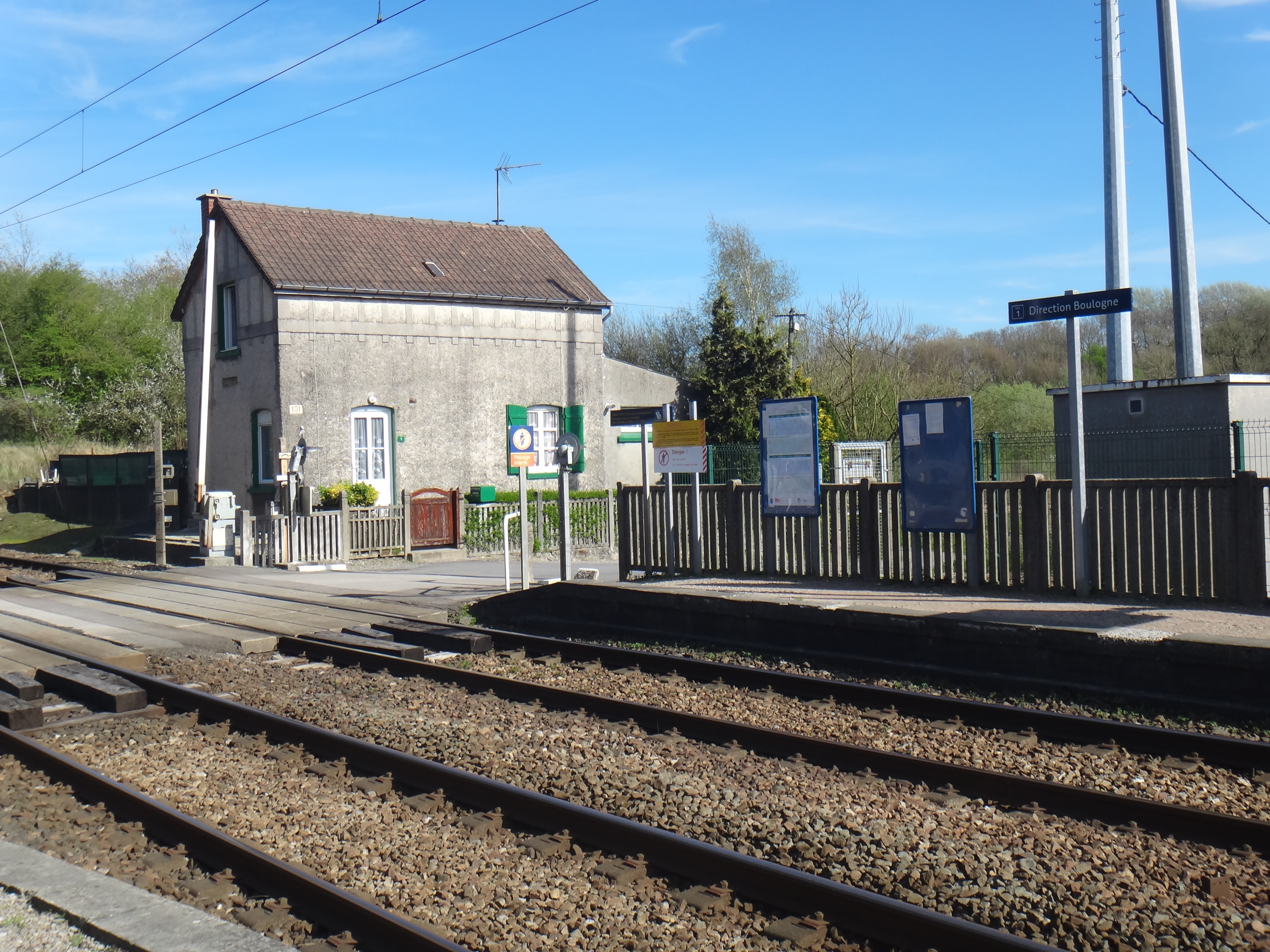
Platform for Boulogne trains, level crossing and cottage

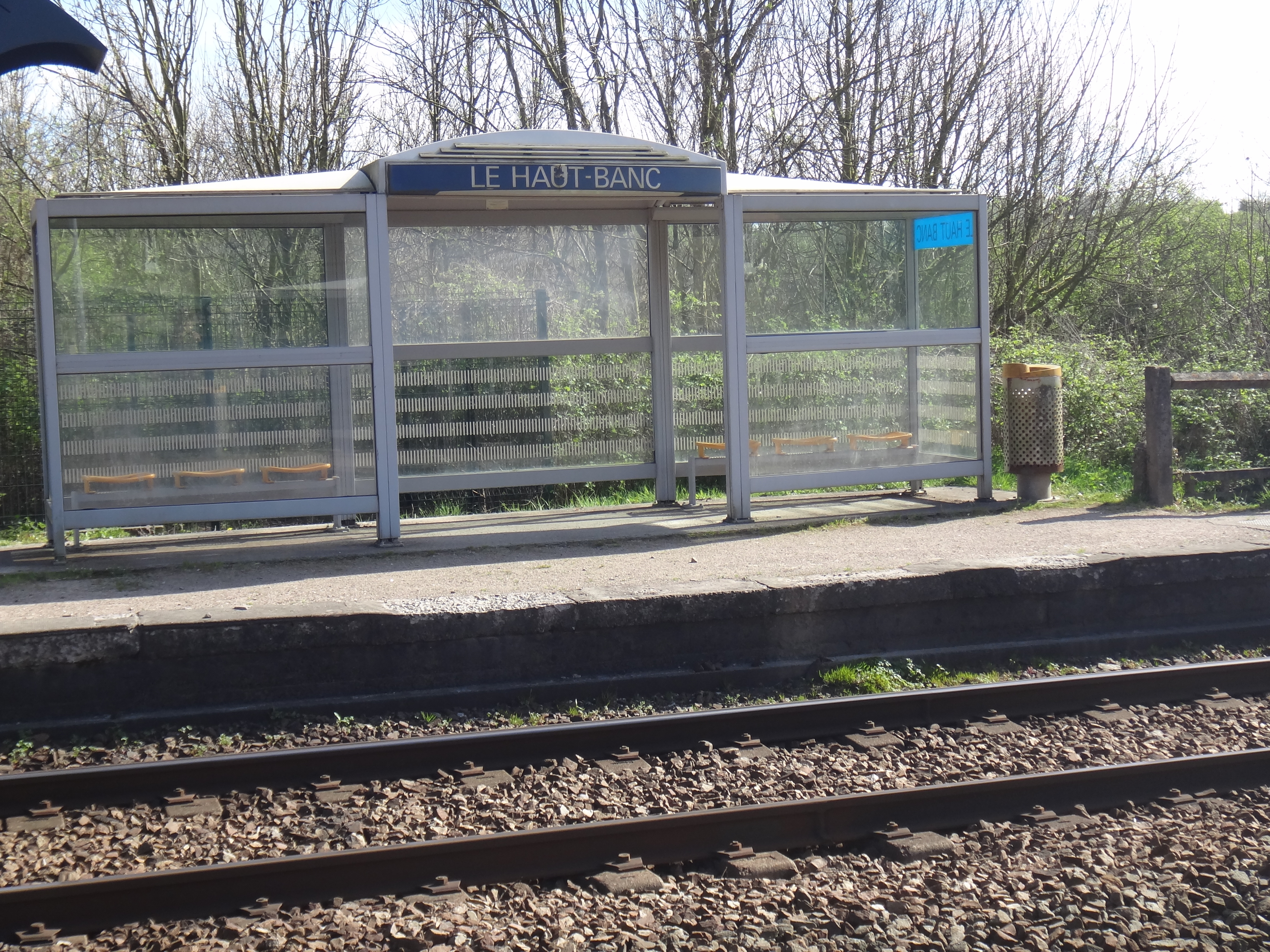
Platform shelter

Le Haut-Banc is a railway station serving the towns Ferques and Rety, in the Pas-de-Calais department, northern France. It is on the Boulogne–Calais railway between Calais and Boulogne and served by regional TER trains.

Preceding station	TER Hauts-de-France	Following station
Marquise–Rinxent towards Rang-du-Fliers	Proxi P73	Caffiers towards Calais
