= Grande-Synthe station =

Railway station in Grande-Synthe, France

Grande-Synthe
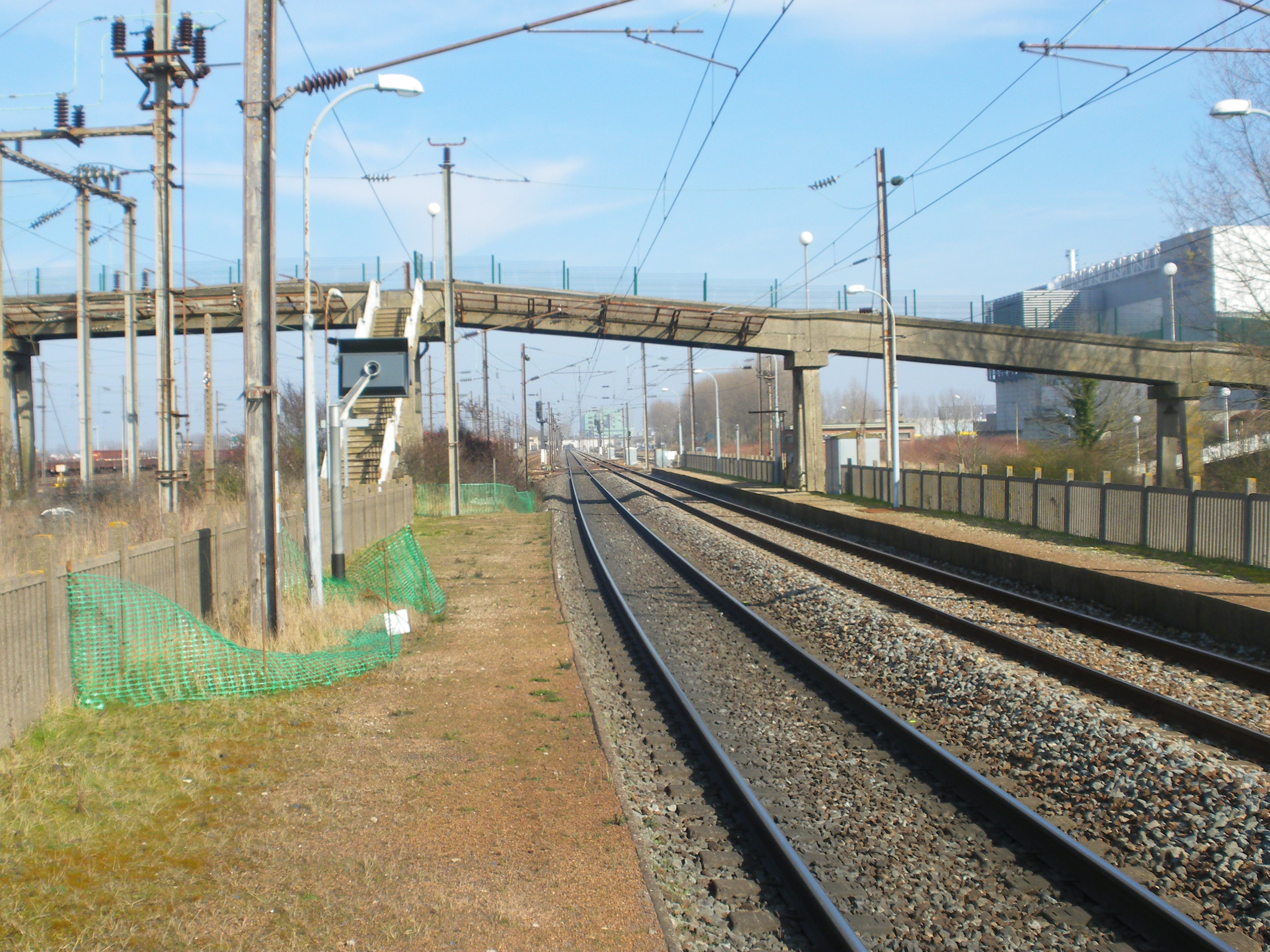
- Platforms and footbridge. Freight tracks to the left.

General information
- Location: Grande-Synthe, Nord; Hauts-de-France, France
- Coordinates: 51°00′08″N 2°18′43″E
- Line: Dunkerque–Calais railway
- Platforms: 2
- Tracks: 2

Other information
- Station code: 87281311

Services
Preceding station	TER Hauts-de-France	Following station
Bourbourg towards Calais	Proxi P72	Coudekerque-Branche towards Dunkerque
Location

Grande-Synthe is a railway station in Grande-Synthe, Hauts-de-France, France.

== History ==
The station is located on the Dunkerque–Calais railway line. The station is served by TER (local) services between Calais and Dunkerque, operated by SNCF.

A large goods yard is also at the station, also called Grande-Synthe.
