= Boulogne-Tintelleries station =

French railway station

Coordinates: 50°48′37″N 1°36′3″E

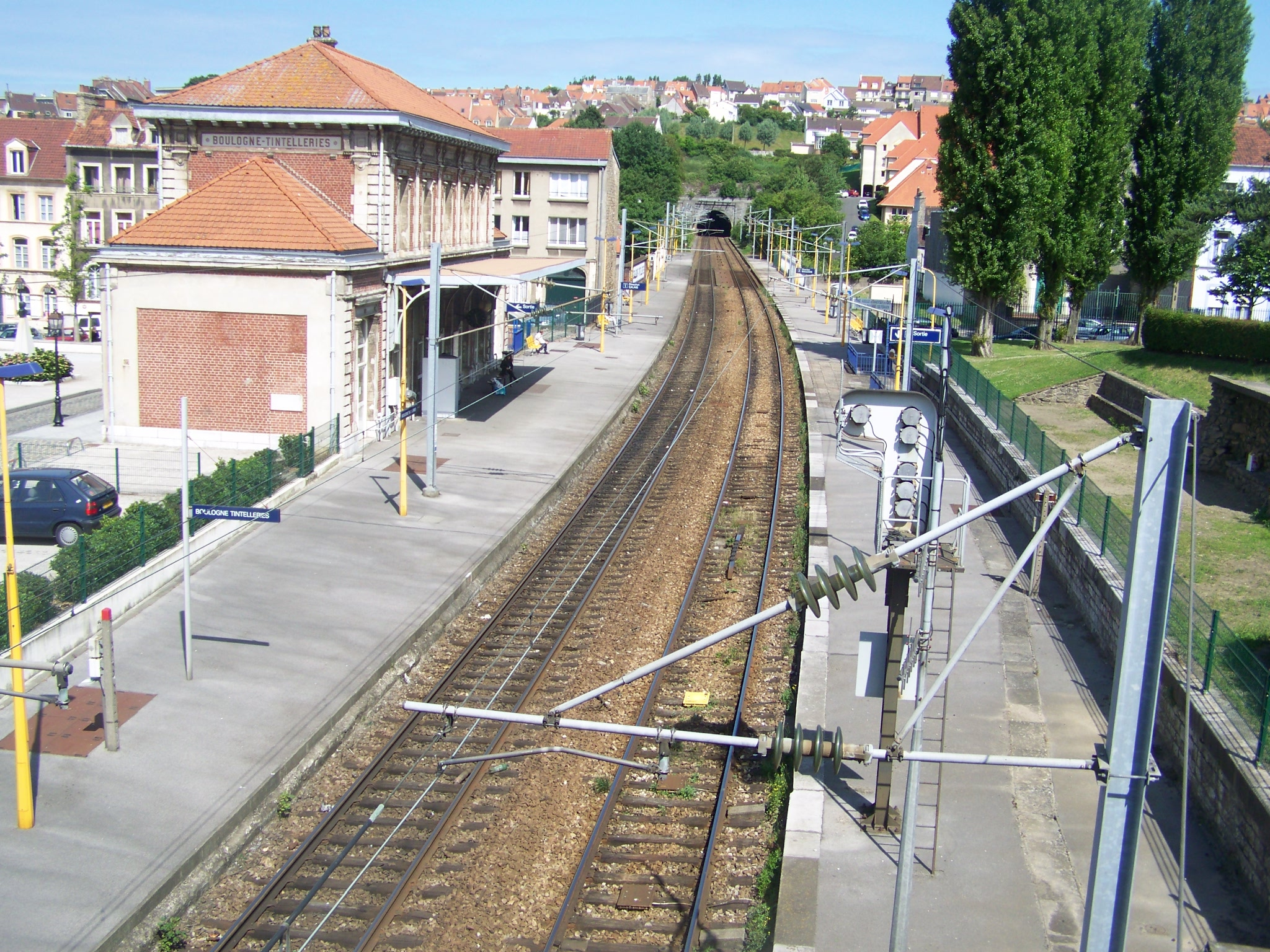
Boulogne-Tintelleries station

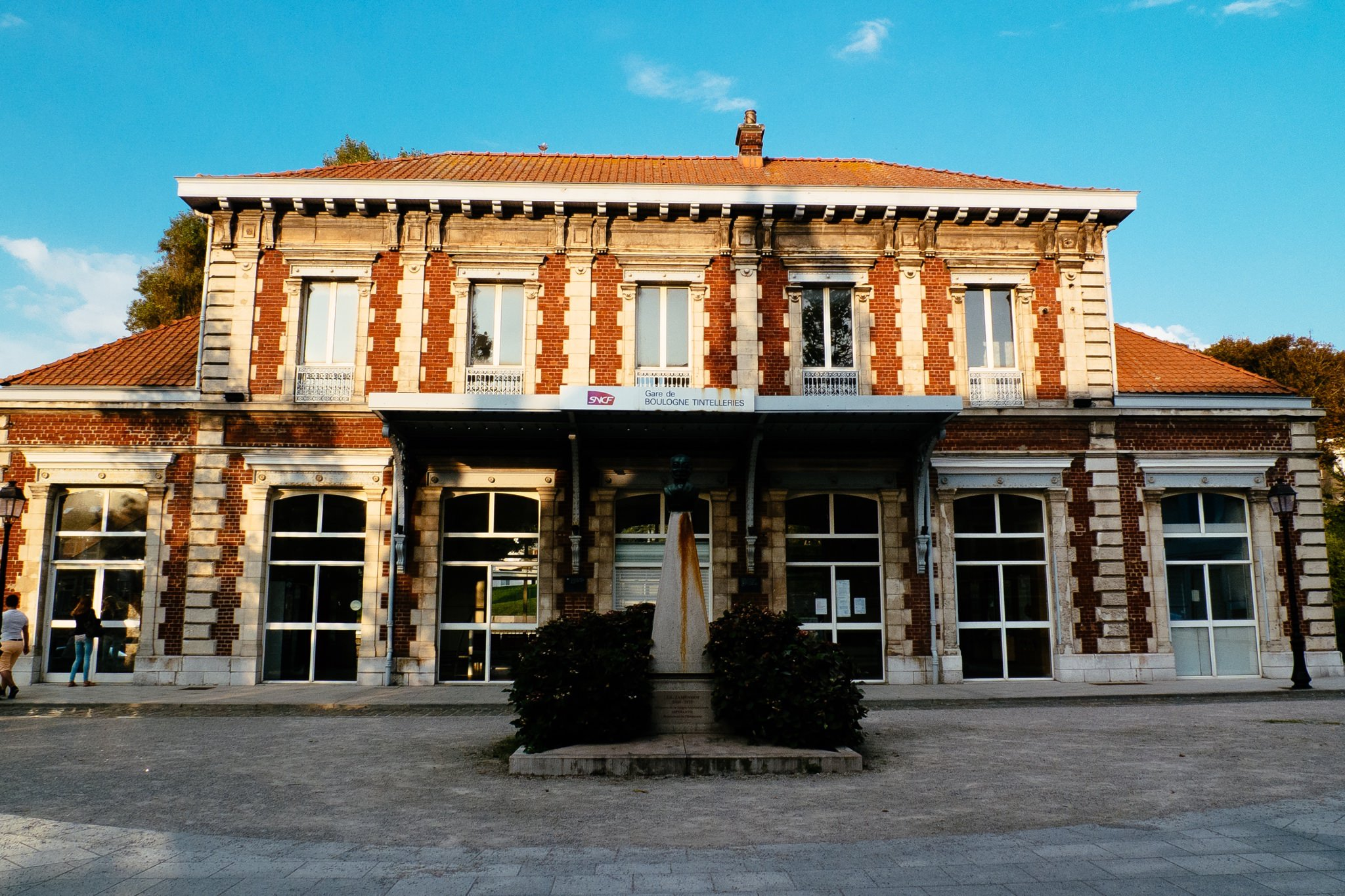
Front of the station

Boulogne-Tintelleries is a railway station serving the historic centre of Boulogne. It opened on May 1, 1893, is located on the Boulogne–Calais railway and served by the SNCF local TER Hauts-de-France.

== Services ==
The station is served by regional trains to Calais, Boulogne-Ville and Amiens.

Preceding station	TER Hauts-de-France	Following station
Boulogne-Ville towards Amiens	Krono K21	Marquise–Rinxent towards Calais
Boulogne-Ville towards Rang-du-Fliers	Proxi P73	Wimille–Wimereux towards Calais
