= Wimille–Wimereux station =

French railway station

Coordinates: 50°45′52″N 1°36′50″E

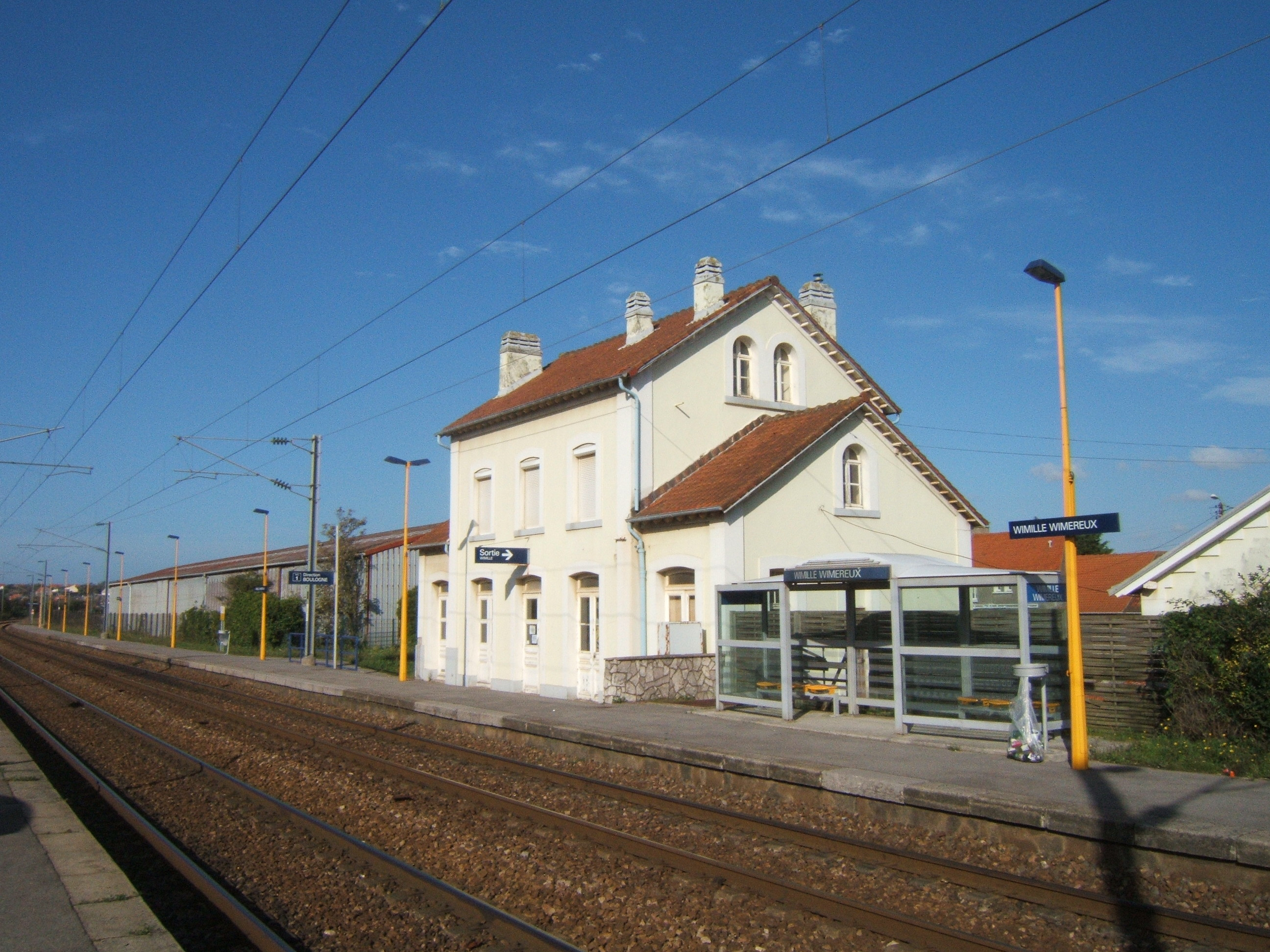
Wimille-Wimereux railway station in 2006

Wimille–Wimereux is a railway station serving the communes of Wimille and Wimereux, Pas-de-Calais department, northern France. It is on the Boulogne–Calais railway between Calais and Boulogne and served by regional TER trains.

Preceding station	TER Hauts-de-France	Following station
Boulogne-Tintelleries towards Rang-du-Fliers	Proxi P73	Marquise–Rinxent towards Calais
