= Caffiers =

- Commune
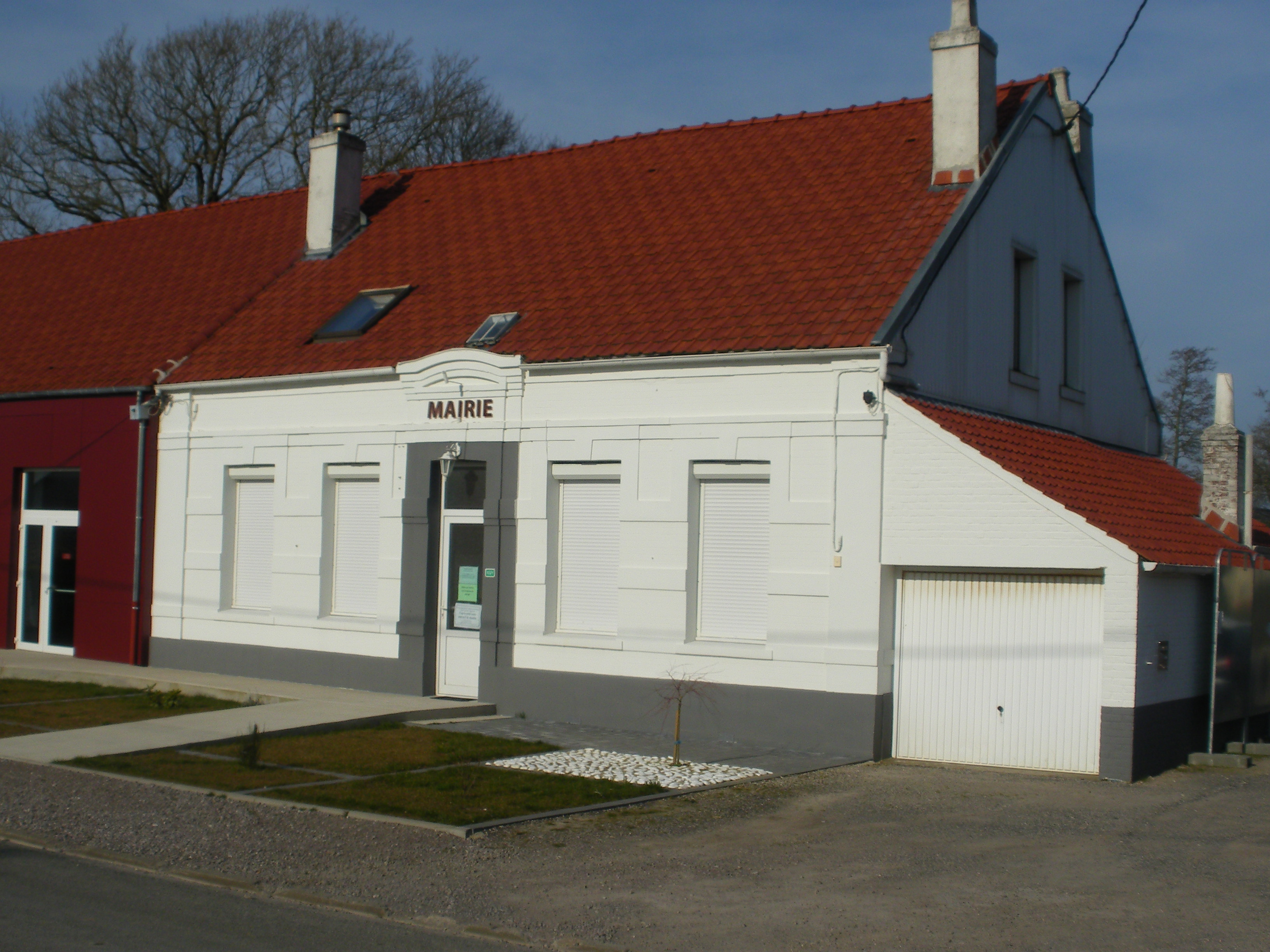
- The town hall of Caffiers

- Coat of arms
- Location of Caffiers
- Location within France Location within Hauts-de-France
- Coordinates: 50°50′26″N 1°48′45″E
- Country: France
- Region: Hauts-de-France
- Department: Pas-de-Calais
- Arrondissement: Calais
- Canton: Calais-2
- Intercommunality: CC Pays d'Opale

Government
  - Mayor (2020–2026): Pascal Gavois
- Area^{1}: 4.77 km^{2} (1.84 sq mi)
- Elevation: 112 m (367 ft)
- Highest elevation: 138 m (453 ft)
- Lowest elevation: 59 m (194 ft)
- Population (2023): 734
  - Density: 154/km^{2} (399/sq mi)
- Time zone: UTC+01:00 (CET)
  - Summer (DST): UTC+02:00 (CEST)
- INSEE/Postal code: 62191 /62132
- ^{1} French Land Register data, which excludes lakes, ponds, glaciers > 1 km^{2} (0.386 sq mi or 247 acres) and river estuaries.

Caffiers (French pronunciation: [kafje]) is a commune in the Pas-de-Calais department in the Hauts-de-France region of France.

== Geography ==
A farming village located 10 miles (16 km) south of Calais, on the D250 road. Caffiers station is situated on the Boulogne-Calais railway.

== Population ==
Historical population
Year	Pop.	±% p.a.
1968	524	—
1975	557	+0.88%
1982	562	+0.13%
1990	586	+0.52%
1999	623	+0.68%
2007	656	+0.65%
2012	729	+2.13%
2017	749	+0.54%
2023	734	−0.34%
Source: INSEE

== Places of interest ==
- The church of St. Eloi, dating from the nineteenth century.

== See also ==
- Communes of the Pas-de-Calais department
