= Grande-Synthe =

Grande-Synthe Groot-Sinten
- Commune
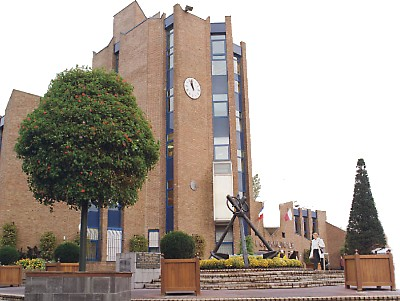
- The Hôtel de Ville

- Coat of arms
- Location of Grande-Synthe
- Location within France Location within Hauts-de-France
- Coordinates: 51°00′50″N 2°18′10″E
- Country: France
- Region: Hauts-de-France
- Department: Nord
- Arrondissement: Dunkerque
- Canton: Grande-Synthe
- Intercommunality: CU de Dunkerque

Government
  - Mayor (2020–2026): Martial Beyaert
- Area^{1}: 21.44 km^{2} (8.28 sq mi)
- Elevation: 2 m (6.6 ft)
- Population (2023): 20,239
  - Density: 944.0/km^{2} (2,445/sq mi)
- Time zone: UTC+01:00 (CET)
  - Summer (DST): UTC+02:00 (CEST)
- INSEE/Postal code: 59271 /59760
- ^{1} French Land Register data, which excludes lakes, ponds, glaciers > 1 km^{2} (0.386 sq mi or 247 acres) and river estuaries.

Grande-Synthe (French pronunciation: [ɡʁɑ̃d sɛ̃t]; West Flemish: Groot-Sinten) is a commune in the Nord department in the Nord-Pas de Calais region in northern France.

It is the second-largest suburb of the city of Dunkerque (Dunkirk) and lies adjacent to it on the west.

== History ==
The Hôtel de Ville was completed in 1978.

In 1980, a large part of Petite-Synthe was detached from Dunkerque and included in Grande-Synthe.

=== Heraldry ===
| Arms of Grande-Synthe | The arms of Grande-Synthe are blazoned : Azure, a fleur de lys Or, and on a chief argent a lion passant sable. |

== Population ==
Historical population

| Year | Pop. | ±% p.a. |
|---|---|---|
| 1793 | 482 | — |
| 1800 | 451 | −0.95% |
| 1806 | 512 | +2.14% |
| 1821 | 598 | +1.04% |
| 1831 | 1,000 | +5.28% |
| 1836 | 1,108 | +2.07% |
| 1841 | 1,170 | +1.09% |
| 1846 | 1,260 | +1.49% |
| 1851 | 1,292 | +0.50% |
| 1856 | 1,510 | +3.17% |
| 1861 | 1,572 | +0.81% |
| 1866 | 1,739 | +2.04% |
| 1872 | 724 | −13.59% |
| 1876 | 753 | +0.99% |
| 1881 | 782 | +0.76% |
| 1886 | 821 | +0.98% |
| 1891 | 887 | +1.56% |
| 1896 | 936 | +1.08% |
| 1901 | 981 | +0.94% |

| Year | Pop. | ±% p.a. |
|---|---|---|
| 1906 | 1,019 | +0.76% |
| 1911 | 1,044 | +0.49% |
| 1921 | 1,175 | +1.19% |
| 1926 | 1,342 | +2.69% |
| 1931 | 1,333 | −0.13% |
| 1936 | 1,404 | +1.04% |
| 1946 | 916 | −4.18% |
| 1954 | 1,551 | +6.80% |
| 1962 | 2,875 | +8.02% |
| 1968 | 12,559 | +27.86% |
| 1975 | 24,250 | +9.86% |
| 1982 | 26,231 | +1.13% |
| 1990 | 24,362 | −0.92% |
| 1999 | 23,247 | −0.52% |
| 2007 | 21,428 | −1.01% |
| 2012 | 21,166 | −0.25% |
| 2017 | 22,966 | +1.65% |
| 2023 | 20,239 | −2.08% |

Source: EHESS and INSEE (1968-2023)

== Politics ==
=== Presidential Elections 2nd Round ===
| Election | Candidate | Party | % |
|---|---|---|---|
| 2017 | Emmanuel Macron | En Marche! | 54.31 |
| 2012 | François Hollande | PS | 70.86 |
| 2007 | Ségolène Royal | PS | 63.46 |
| 2002 | Jacques Chirac | RPR | 72.86 |

== International relations ==
Grande-Synthe is twinned with:

- Suwałki in Poland

== Personalities ==
- Remy Vercoutre, footballer
- Lucas Pouille, tennis player

== Transport ==
- Gare de Grande-Synthe railway station.

== See also ==
- Communes of the Nord department
