= Hôtel de Ville, Grande-Synthe =

Town hall in Grande-Synthe, France

Hôtel de Ville
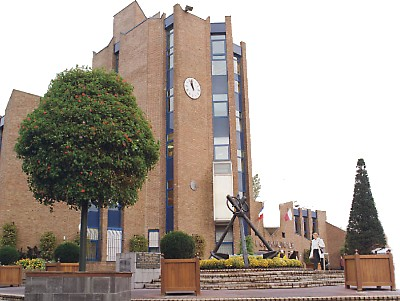
- The main frontage of the Hôtel de Ville in 1990

General information
- Type: City hall
- Architectural style: Modern style
- Location: Grande-Synthe, France
- Coordinates: 51.0137°N 2.3025°E
- Completed: 1978

The Hôtel de Ville (French pronunciation: [otɛl də vil], City Hall) is a municipal building in Grande-Synthe, Nord, in northern France, standing on Place François Mitterrand.

== History ==
In the 19th century, the town council met in the house of the mayor at the time. This arrangement continued until 1933 when the council established a municipal office in a building on the corner of Rue du Garnaerstraete et l'Avenue de l'Ancien Village. There was a classroom for boys on the ground floor and the municipal office was on the first floor.

After this proved cramped, the council decided to commission a new building at No. 40 Avenue de l'Ancien Village. This, the second town hall, was designed in the Flemish style, built in brown brick and was officially opened on 23 November 1933. The design involved a main frontage in two sections facing onto the street. The left-hand section of five bays was formed a two-storey building, while the second section of two bays was single-storey and, beyond it, there was an opening with a stepped gable leading to a playground. Internally, there were two classrooms as well as a municipal office. This town hall was destroyed by German troops on 16 September 1944, carried out as part of a scorched earth policy as they withdrew from the area.

During the latter stages of the war the council was accommodated in temporary premises in Esquelbecq and then in Loon-Plage, the third and fourth town halls respectively. After the liberation of the town in June 1945, the council established a fifth municipal office at No. 120 Route de Fort-Mardyck. The council next moved to a sixth building on the corner of Rue Pierre Loti and Avenue René Carême from March 1946. A fire in this building destroyed some of the municipal archives in January 1954. After that, the council opened a seventh town hall at No. 26 Avenue de l'Ancien Village in 1958. After it was no longer required for municipal use, that building went on to serve as a community centre known as the Maison De La Citoyenneté.

In the early 1970s, following significant population growth, the council led by the mayor, René Carême, decided to establish a modern town hall. The site they selected was on what is now Place François Mitterrand. The eighth town hall was designed in the modern style, built in red brick and glass and was officially opened on 20 May 1978. The design involved a six-storey tower with alternating vertical sections of casement windows and blind walls, supplemented by low-rise sections in a similar style and a single-storey octagonal structure containing the Salle du Conseil (council chamber) behind.
