= Marquise–Rinxent station =

French railway station

Coordinates: 50°48′19″N 1°43′49″E

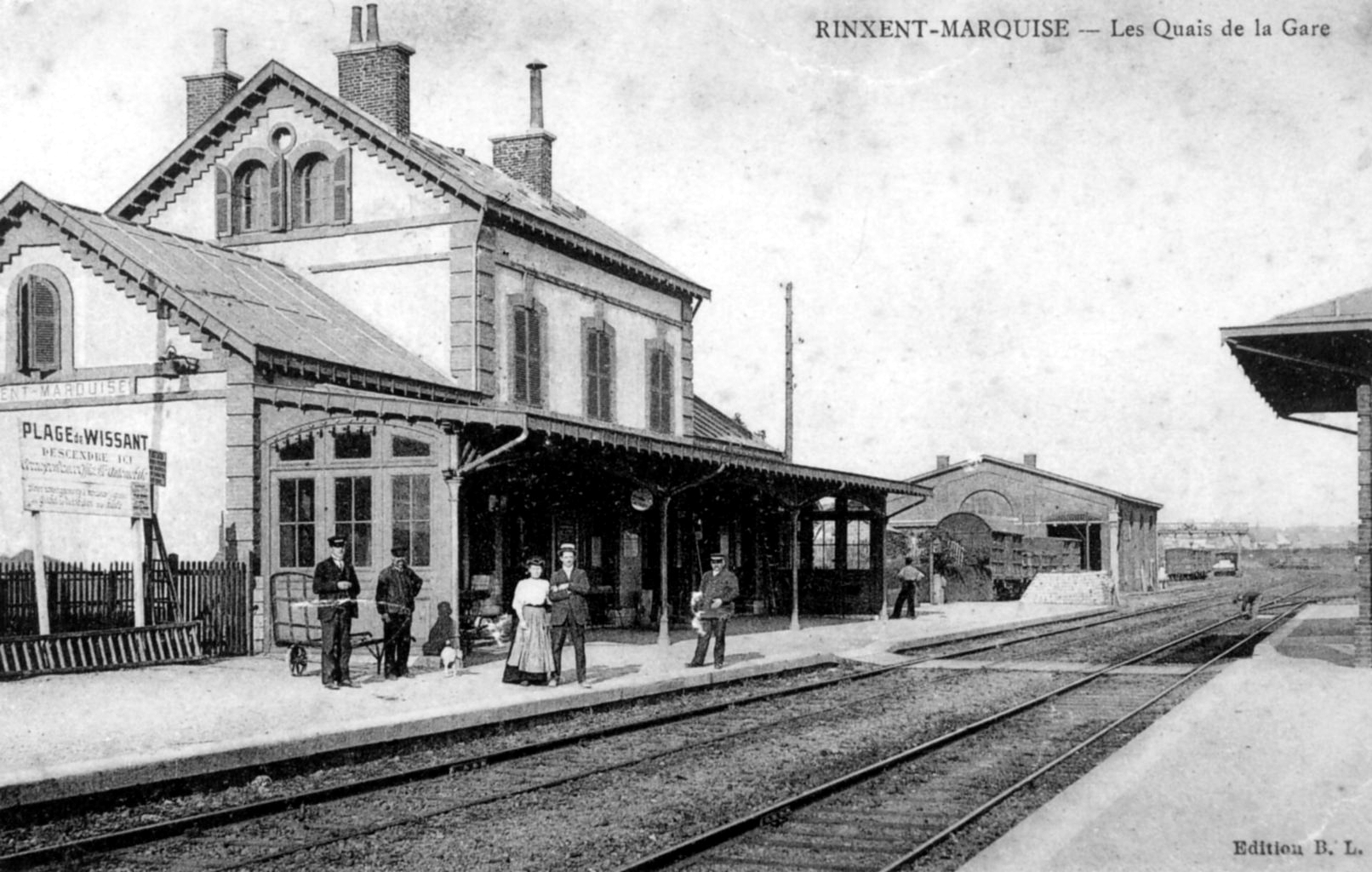
Marquise-Rinxent railway station about 1900

Marquise–Rinxent is a railway station on the Boulogne-Ville line in Calais-Maritime serving the towns Marquise and Rinxent, in the Pas-de-Calais department, in the Hauts region of northern France. It is a station of the French National Railway Company (SNCF), served by TER Hauts-de-France trains. It is open to freight service.

== History ==
The station was opened in 1867 on the classic model of a category 4 station of the Compagnie du Nord. ^{[ref. necessary]}

From 1883 and the inauguration of the local industrial railway, it carried out important freight activity linked to quarries and the transformation of these quarry products into chalk and lime.

In 1916, a military junction was built towards the airship base installed by the army 800m south of the station to serve and supply the hydrogen plant which then inflated the airships.

From 1940, the station was heavily bombarded, particularly in the context of the Battle of Dunkirk (to prevent any reinforcements coming in), then again from 1942 as part of Operation Fortitude intended to make the Nazis believe in the imminence of a landing in the Pas de Calais . The proximity of the Wimereux viaduct and the shelter of one of the three K5 railway guns intended to bomb London or ships that could cross the Channel caused heavy damage to the station but also to the nearby dwellings.

The current passenger building was opened in the 1950s and the freight hall closed in the 1970s.

During the 1980s, the branch of the factories was closed and in 1994, during the electrification, the track connection and the western rights-of-way were removed while the branch of the Boulonnais quarries is still in service and sees several trains passing. weekly.

Preceding station	TER Hauts-de-France	Following station
Boulogne-Tintelleries towards Amiens	Krono K21	Calais Terminus
Wimille-Wimereux towards Rang-du-Fliers	Proxi P73	Le Haut-Banc towards Calais
