= Les Fontinettes station =

French railway station

Les Fontinettes
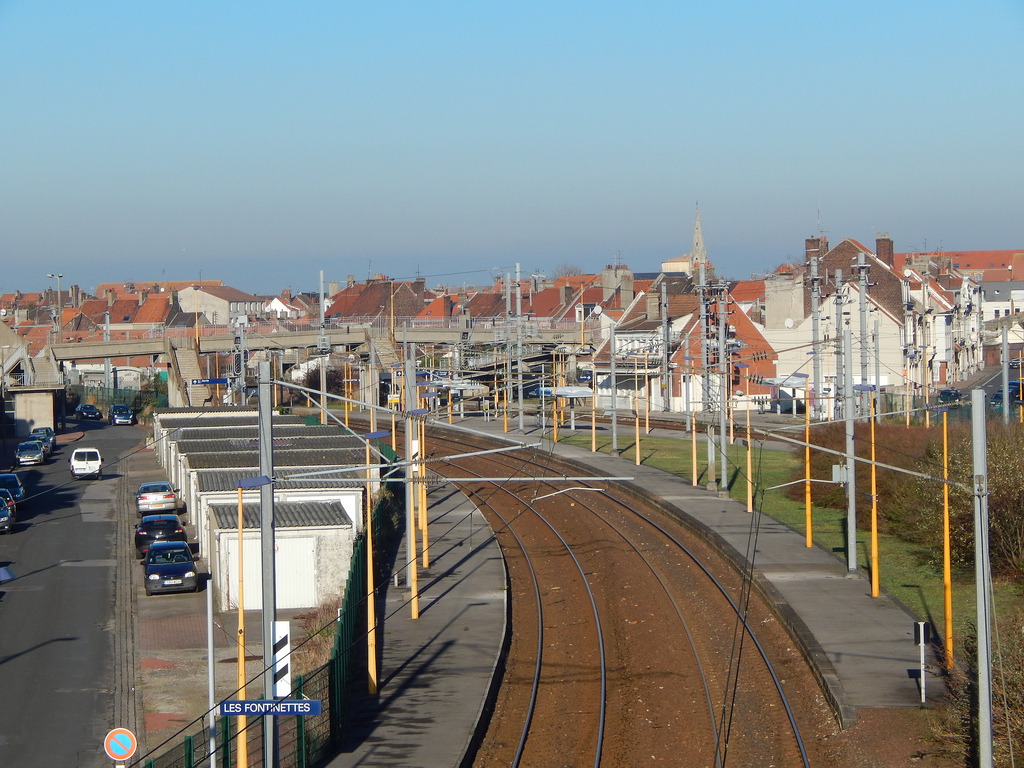
- The station as viewed from Cité des Cheminots.

General information
- Location: Rue des Fontinettes; 62100 Calais; Pas-de-Calais, France
- Coordinates: 50.940881°N 1.849919°E
- Owner: SNCF
- Operator: SNCF
- Platforms: 4
- Train operators: TER Hauts-de-France

Other information
- Station code: 87317305

History
- Electrified: 25 kV 50 Hz

Services
Preceding station	TER Hauts-de-France	Following station
Calais-Ville Terminus	Proxi P54	Pont-d'Ardres towards Arras
Calais-Ville Terminus	Proxi P72	Beau-Marais towards Dunkerque
Calais-Fréthun towards Rang-du-Fliers	Proxi P73	Calais-Ville Terminus

Other services
	Disused railways	
Calais-St.-Pierre (1881–1900); Calais-Ville (1900–55)	Anvin–Calais; Metre gauge	Coulogne
Location

Les Fontinettes station (French: Gare des Fontinettes) is a railway station in Calais, France. It is on a triangular junction, where the Coudekerque-Branche–Fontinettes railway, Lille–Fontinettes railway and Boulogne–Calais railway all meet. Some trains pass through the station twice, before and after calling at Calais-Ville.

The station is served by TER Hauts-de-France trains travelling from Calais-Ville to Hazebrouck, Dunkirk and Boulogne. It has four platforms.
