= Boulogne–Calais railway =

Railway in France

Coordinates: 50.8016°N 1.7163°E

Boulogne-Calais railway
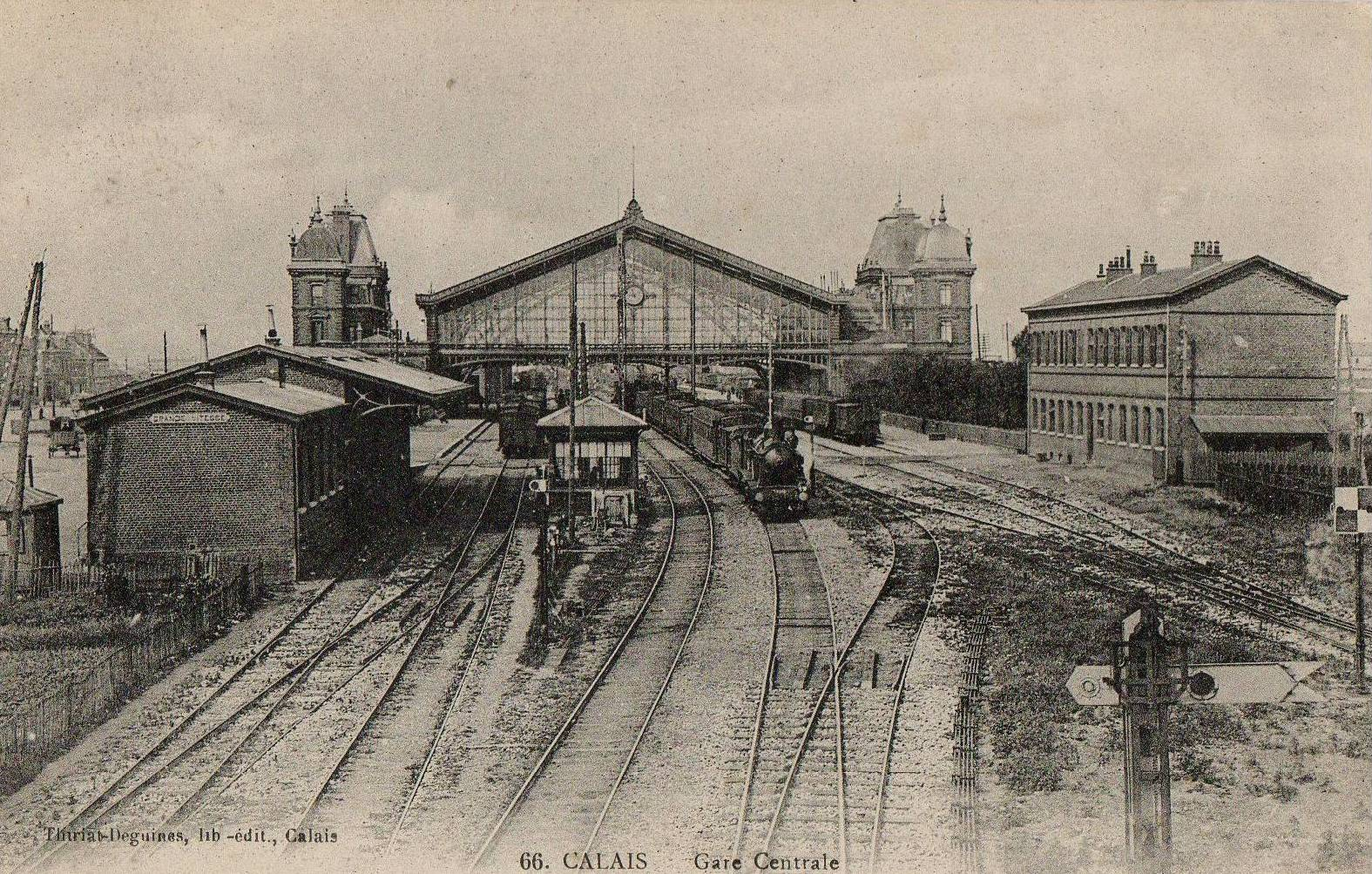
- Calais railway station in about 1910

Overview
- Status: Operational
- Owner: RFF
- Locale: France (Hauts-de-France)
- Termini: Calais-Ville station; Boulogne-Ville station

Service
- System: SNCF
- Operator(s): SNCF

History
- Opened: 1867

Technical
- Number of tracks: Double track
- Track gauge: 1,435 mm (4 ft 8 1/2 in) standard gauge
- Electrification: 25 kV 50 Hz

The Boulogne–Calais railway is an electrified double track railway running between the ports of Boulogne-sur-Mer and Calais in France. An extension of the Longueau–Boulogne railway it meets the Lille–Fontinettes railway and Coudekerque-Branche–Fontinettes railway to Dunkirk at Les Fontinettes station in Calais.

The line opened on 7 January 1867 with railway stations at Wimille, Marquise, Caffiers and St Pierre. It was used only for local traffic between Boulogne and Calais until that March when the Paris to Calais trains were diverted, cutting 30 minutes off the Paris to London mail route.

Until the start of the Eurostar service from London to Paris in 1994 via LGV Nord it was the main route for the boat trains to Paris which met the ships carrying passengers from Great Britain. As of 2022 the line is used by TGV services from Rang-du-Fliers via Calais-Fréthun to Lille-Europe and local TER Hauts-de-France services.
