= Lille–Fontinettes railway =

French railway

Coordinates: 50.7315°N 2.3862°E

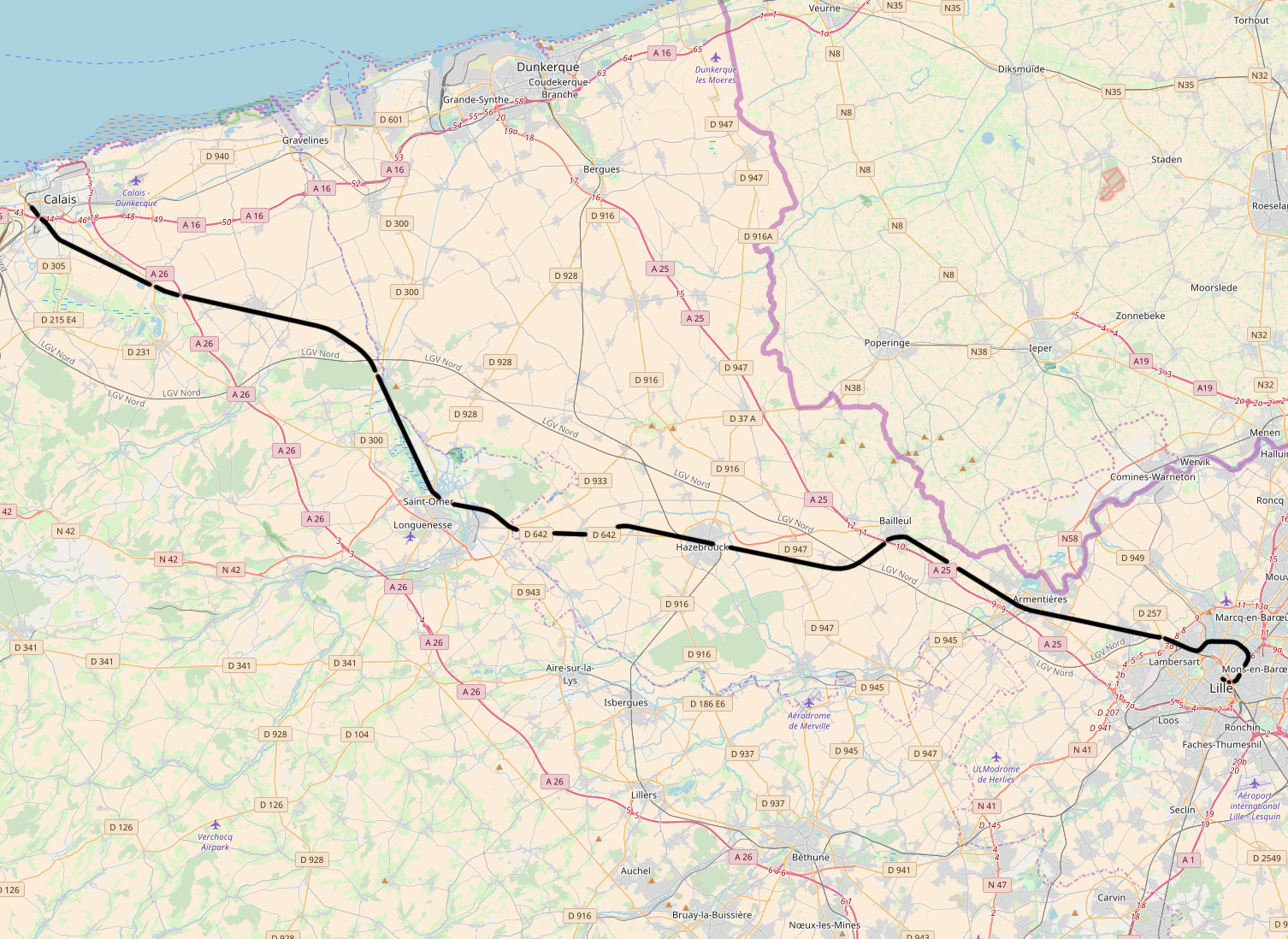
- Map of line from Lille to Calais

Overview
- Status: Operational
- Owner: RFF
- Locale: France (Hauts-de-France)
- Termini: Lille Flandres station; Les Fontinettes station, Calais

Service
- System: SNCF
- Operator: SNCF

History
- Opened: 1848

Technical
- Line length: 105 km (65 mi)
- Num of tracks: Double track
- Track gauge: 1,435 mm (4 ft 8 1/2 in) standard gauge
- Electrification: 25 kV 50 Hz

The Lille–Fontinettes railway is a French railway which runs from Lille-Flandres station to Les Fontinettes station near Calais. The 105 kilometres (65 mi) long railway is an electrified double track.

Completed in 1848, it was the first railway to reach the coastal port of Calais. The Paris-Lille railway had reached Lille from Paris two years previously.

In 1993, it was bypassed by the LGV Nord high-speed line running from Lille-Europe to Calais-Fréthun and the Channel Tunnel. The main traffic today is freight and local TER Hauts-de-France passenger trains.

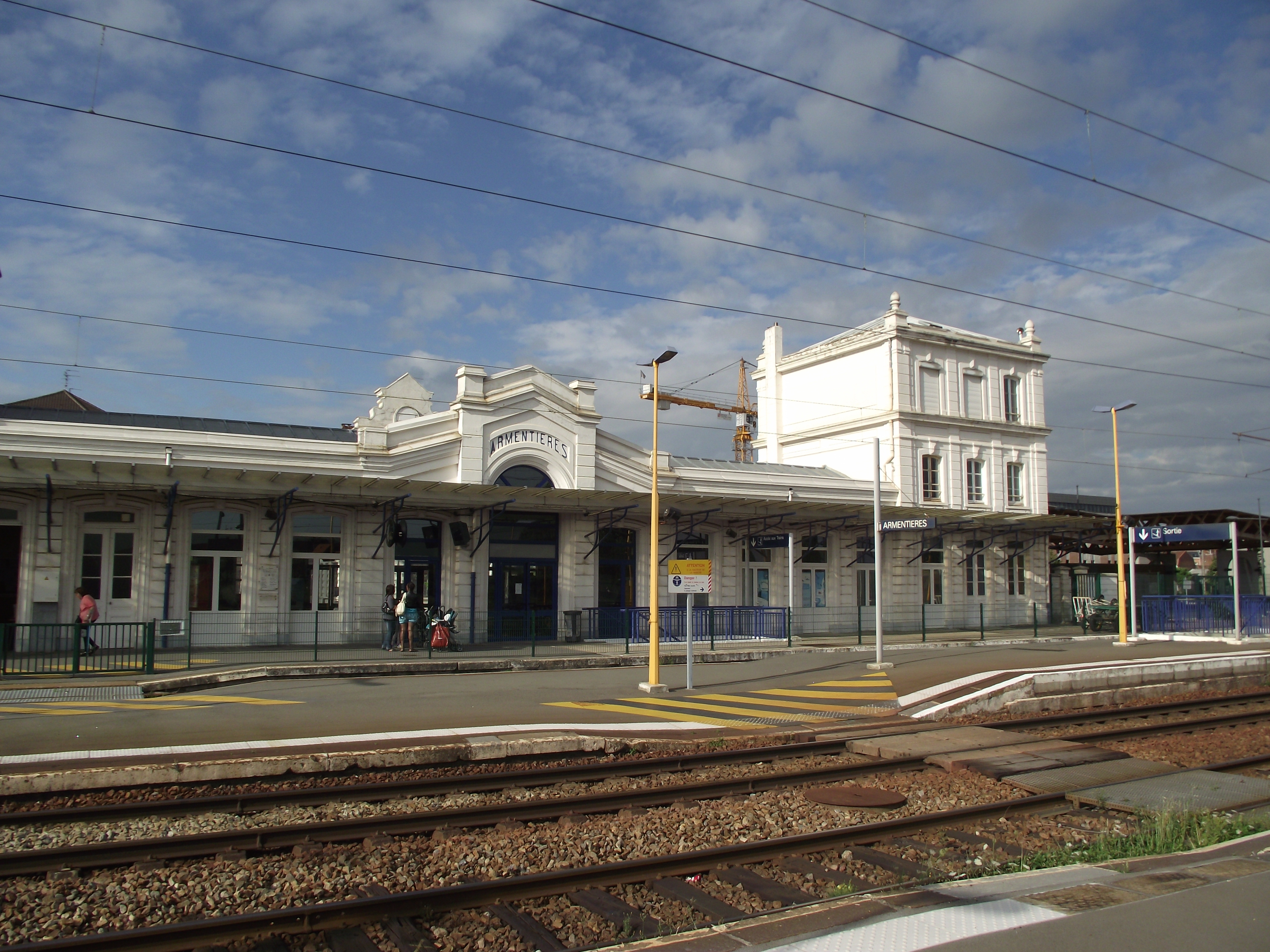
Armentières station located in French Flanders.
