= Coudekerque-Branche–Fontinettes railway =

Railway in France

Coordinates: 50.9827°N 2.2252°E

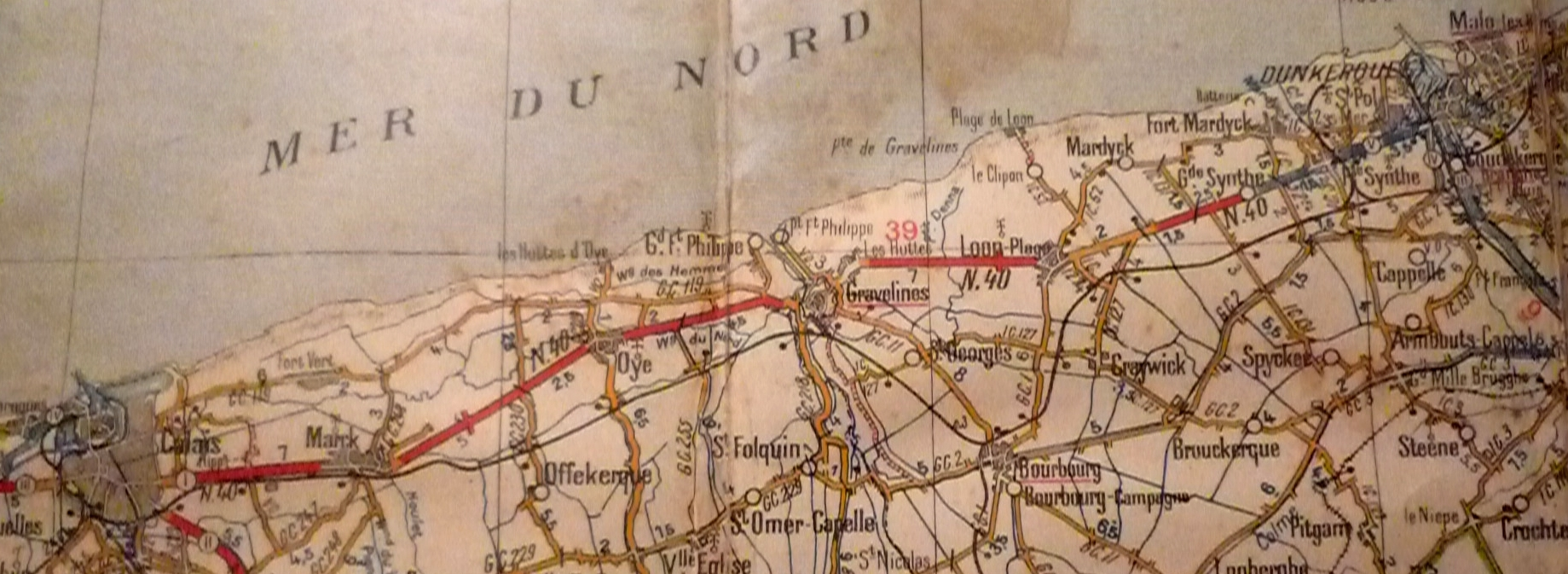
- Route on a 1920s map

Overview
- Status: Operational
- Owner: RFF
- Locale: France (Hauts-de-France)
- Termini: Les Fontinettes station, Calais; Coudekerque-Branche, Dunkirk

Service
- System: SNCF
- Operator(s): SNCF

History
- Opened: 1876

Technical
- Line length: 41.159 km (25.575 mi)
- Number of tracks: Single track
- Track gauge: 1,435 mm (4 ft 8 1/2 in) standard gauge
- Electrification: 25 kV AC Overhead

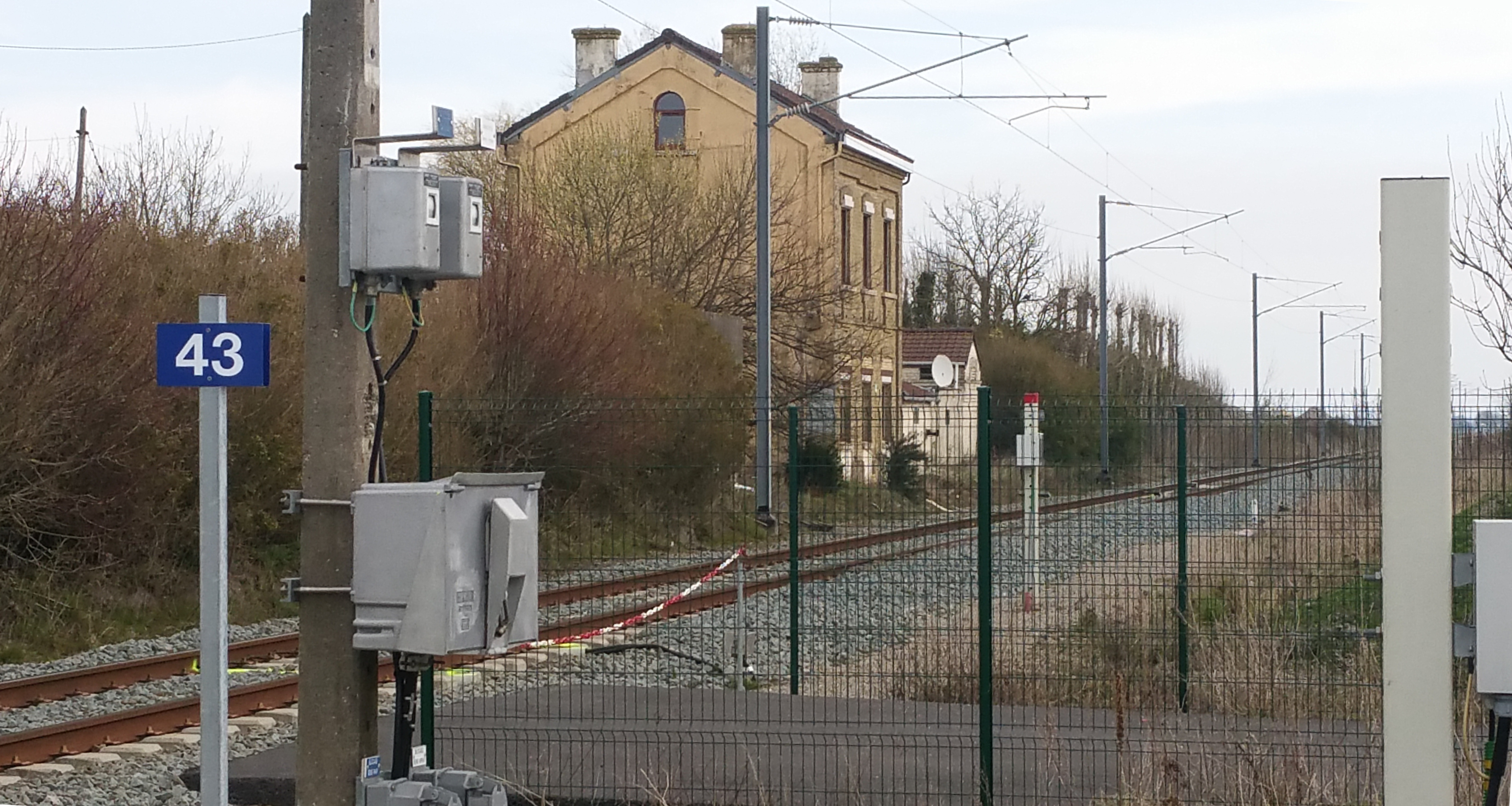
The line and a former station at Pont-d'Oye

The Coudekerque-Branche–Fontinettes railway runs along the English Channel and North Sea coast of France from a junction near Coudekerque-Branche station in Dunkirk to a junction near Les Fontinettes station in Calais. It is 41.159 kilometres (25.575 miles) long and AC electrified single track for much of its length, except for the first 10 kilometres (6.2 miles) from Dunkirk, which is double track electrified with 25 kV 50 Hz in. Line speeds are from 80 km/h (50 mph) to 120 km/h (75 mph). There is a movable bridge over the Aa at Gravelines to allow navigation of the river.

The line is used by local trains between Calais and Dunkirk.

== History ==
The line was built by Compagnie du Nord-Est and opened on 10 August 1876. Operations were transferred on 5 June 1883 to Compagnie des chemins de fer du Nord.

A second track was added to the entire line in 1915. The first ten kilometres of the line from Coudekerque was electrified in 1962, and the marshalling yard (triage de Grande-Synthe) at Grande-Sythe was built between 1962 and 1965.

Plans to electrify the line were completed by 2015.
