= Calais-Fréthun station =

Railway station in Calais, France

Calais–Fréthun
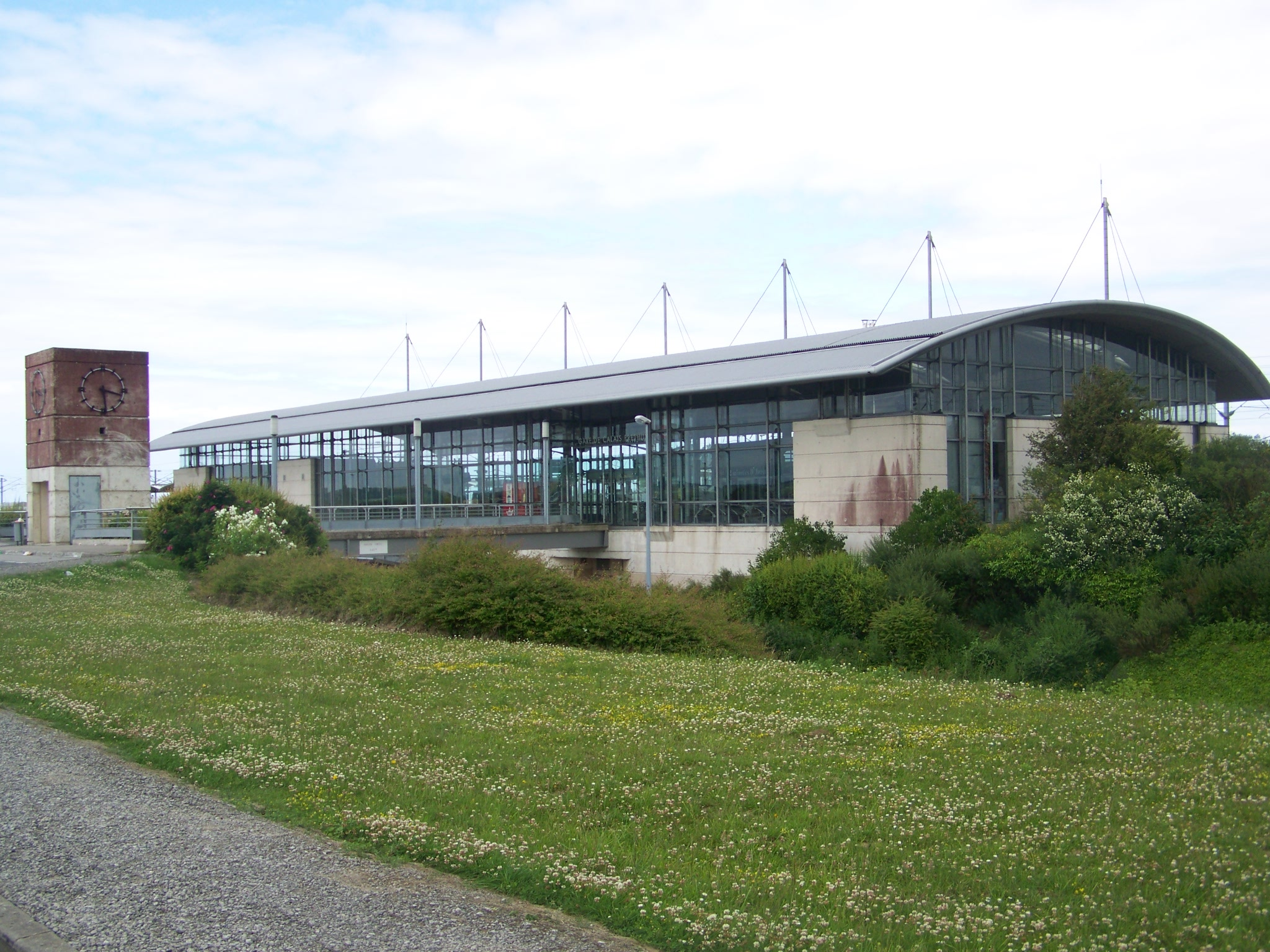
- Main station building

General information
- Location: Rue de la Gare; Calais; France
- Coordinates: 50°54′07″N 1°48′43″E
- Owner: SNCF
- Operator: SNCF
- Line: LGV Nord
- Platforms: 4
- Tracks: 6

Construction
- Platform levels: 3

Other information
- Station code: 87281071
- IATA code: XFF
- Website: https://www.sncf.com/en/stations/calais-frethun/OCE87281071/departures-arrivals/gl/departures

History
- Opened: 26 September 1993
Services
Preceding station	SNCF	Following station
Boulogne-Ville towards	TGV	Lille-Europe towards
Preceding station	TER Hauts-de-France	Following station
Boulogne-Ville towards	Krono+ GV	Lille-Europe towards
Les Fontinettes towards	Proxi	Marquise Rinxent towards
Location

Calais-Fréthun station (French: Gare de Calais-Fréthun) is an SNCF international railway station in the suburbs of Calais, France. It is one of four stations serving the town; the others are Calais-Ville in the town centre, Fontinettes in the suburbs, and Beau Marais in the suburbs.

The station has four platforms, two on the high-speed line for Eurostar services, and two for SNCF TER Hauts-de-France regional services. The TER platforms are also used by some TGV long-distance services.

== TGV ==
High-speed TGV trains called Krono+ GV service stop here on journeys from Lille-Europe to Calais, Boulogne and Rang-du-Fliers-Verton-Berck, and Arras.

== TER Hauts-de-France ==
The local trains are run by TER Hauts-de-France which covers the region. The station is served by regional trains to Calais, Boulogne, Arras, Amiens and Lille.

== Former Eurostar service ==
Calais-Fréthun is the first station on the continental side of the Eurostar route and passengers could alight here to connect onto the SNCF or LGV Nord services. As of July 2011 three services a day called in each direction travelling between London and Brussels via Lille-Europe. However, these were suspended in 2020 as a result of the COVID-19 pandemic, and as of Summer 2023 there is as yet no date for their resumption.

After the 'Additional Protocol to the Sangatte Protocol' was signed by France and the United Kingdom on 29 May 2000, juxtaposed controls were set up in the station. Eurostar passengers travelling to the UK clear exit checks from the Schengen Area (carried out by the French Border Police) as well as UK entry checks (conducted by the UK Border Force) in the station before boarding their train.
