= Calais-Ville station =

Railway station in Calais, France

Calais–Ville
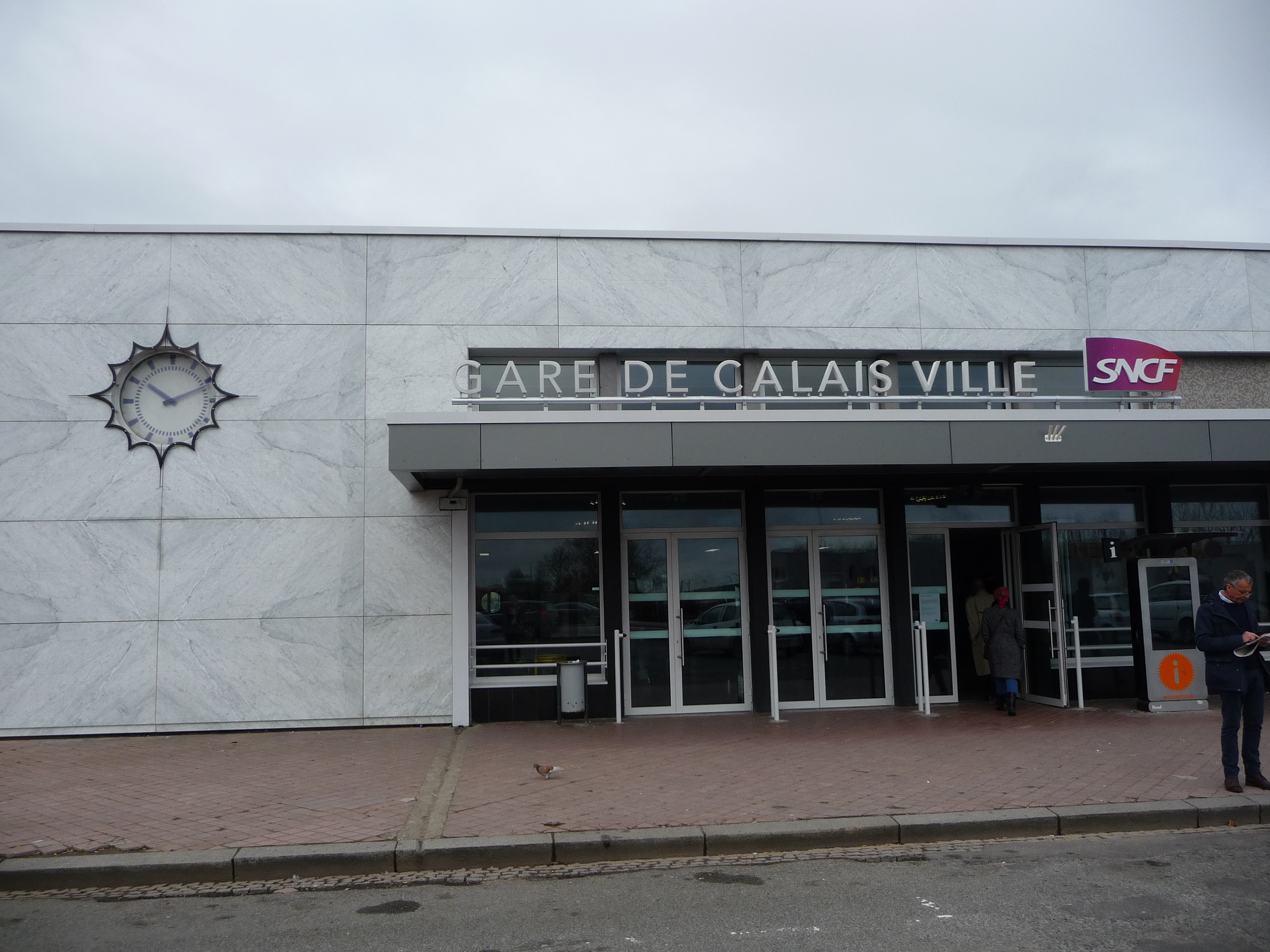
- Entrance to the station in 2015.

General information
- Location: 46 avenue du Président-Wilson; 62100 Calais; Pas-de-Calais; France
- Coordinates: 50°57′12″N 1°51′2″E
- Lines: Coudekerque-Branche–Fontinettes railway Lille–Fontinettes railway Boulogne–Calais railway Anvin–Calais railway (closed)

Other information
- Station code: 87317263

History
- Opened: 1849

Passengers
- 2024: 1,431,510
Services
Preceding station	SNCF	Following station
Terminus	TGV inOui	Calais-Fréthun towards Paris-Nord
Preceding station	Venice Simplon-Orient-Express	Following station
Folkestone West via Eurotunnel Shuttle towards London Victoria	London–Paris–Rome	Paris-Est towards Rome
Folkestone West via Eurotunnel Shuttle towards London Victoria	Venice–Budapest–London	Paris-Est towards Venice
Folkestone West via Eurotunnel Shuttle towards London Victoria	Venice–Prague–London	Paris-Est towards Venice
Preceding station	TER Hauts-de-France	Following station
Boulogne towards Paris-Nord	Krono K16	Terminus
Marquise-Rinxent towards Amiens	Krono K21	Terminus
Terminus	Krono K71	Audruicq towards Lille-Flandres
Terminus	Proxi P54	Les Fontinettes towards Arras
Terminus	Proxi P72	Les Fontinettes towards Dunkerque
Les Fontinettes towards Rang-du-Fliers	Proxi P73	Terminus
Former services
	Disused railways	
Terminus	Anvin - Calais line Metre gauge	Les Fontinettes
Location

Calais-Ville station (French: Gare de Calais-Ville) is a railway station in the city centre of Calais, France.

== History ==
Gare de Ville opened in 1849, replacing the temporary St. Pierre station which had opened in 1846 and subsequently became the site of a marshalling yard. It was rebuilt in 1888–89. In 1900, the metre gauge Chemin de fer d'Anvin à Calais (CF AC) was extended from St. Pierre to Calais-Ville, enabling the closure of St. Pierre.

In the Second World War, Calais-Ville station had been severely damaged in 1940 during the Battle of France, and further damaged in 1944 when Calais was liberated by Allied forces. The remaining station buildings were demolished and temporary buildings erected to serve until the station was rebuilt. The CF AC closed on 1 March 1955. Calais-Ville station was subsequently rebuilt.

== Services ==
It is the principal station for commuter and short-distance rail services in Calais. Another station Calais-Fréthun, which is where longer distance trains depart from, is connected by a free shuttle bus service (to meet with trains to Paris). There is a third smaller station at Les Fontinettes.

There is a shuttle service bus from the Port of Calais to the station.

The station is served by the following trains:

- High speed trains (TGV) Paris - Lille - Calais

Regional trains (TER Hauts-de-France):

- line K16 to Boulogne, Amiens and Paris
- line K21 to Boulogne and Amiens
- line K71 to Hazebrouck and Lille

Local trains: (TER Hauts-de-France):

- line P54 to Hazebrouck, Béthune, Lens and Arras
- line P71 to Hazebrouck
- line P72 to Dunkirk
- line P73 to Boulogne, Étaples and Rang-du-Fliers

There is one TGV return service via Calais-Fréthun to Lille-Europe each day.

It was formerly served by the Chemin de fer d'Anvin à Calais between 1900 and 1955.

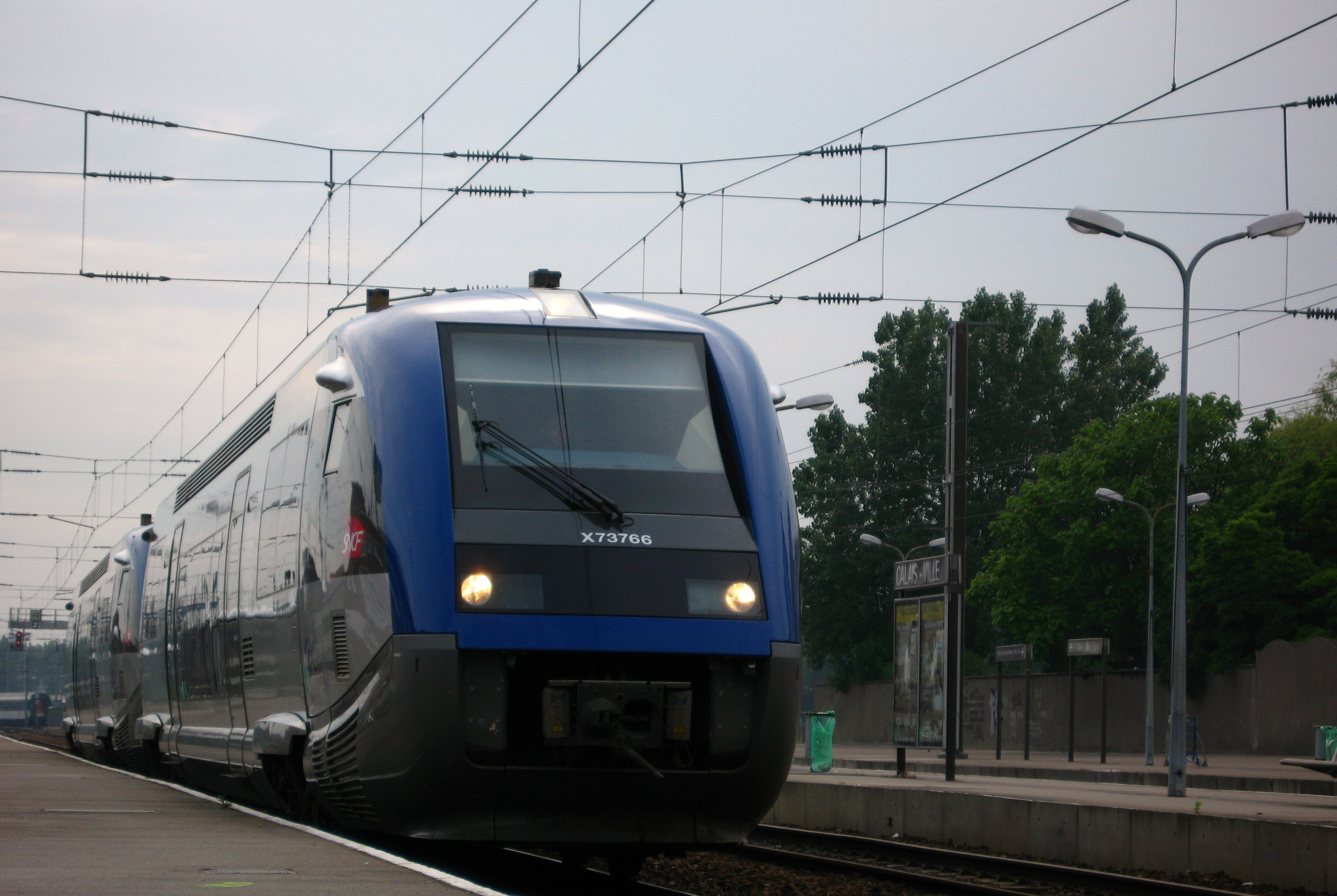
Calais-Ville with TER Nord-Pas-de-Calais rolling stock.

== See also ==
- Port of Calais
- Port of Dover
