= Anvin =

- Commune
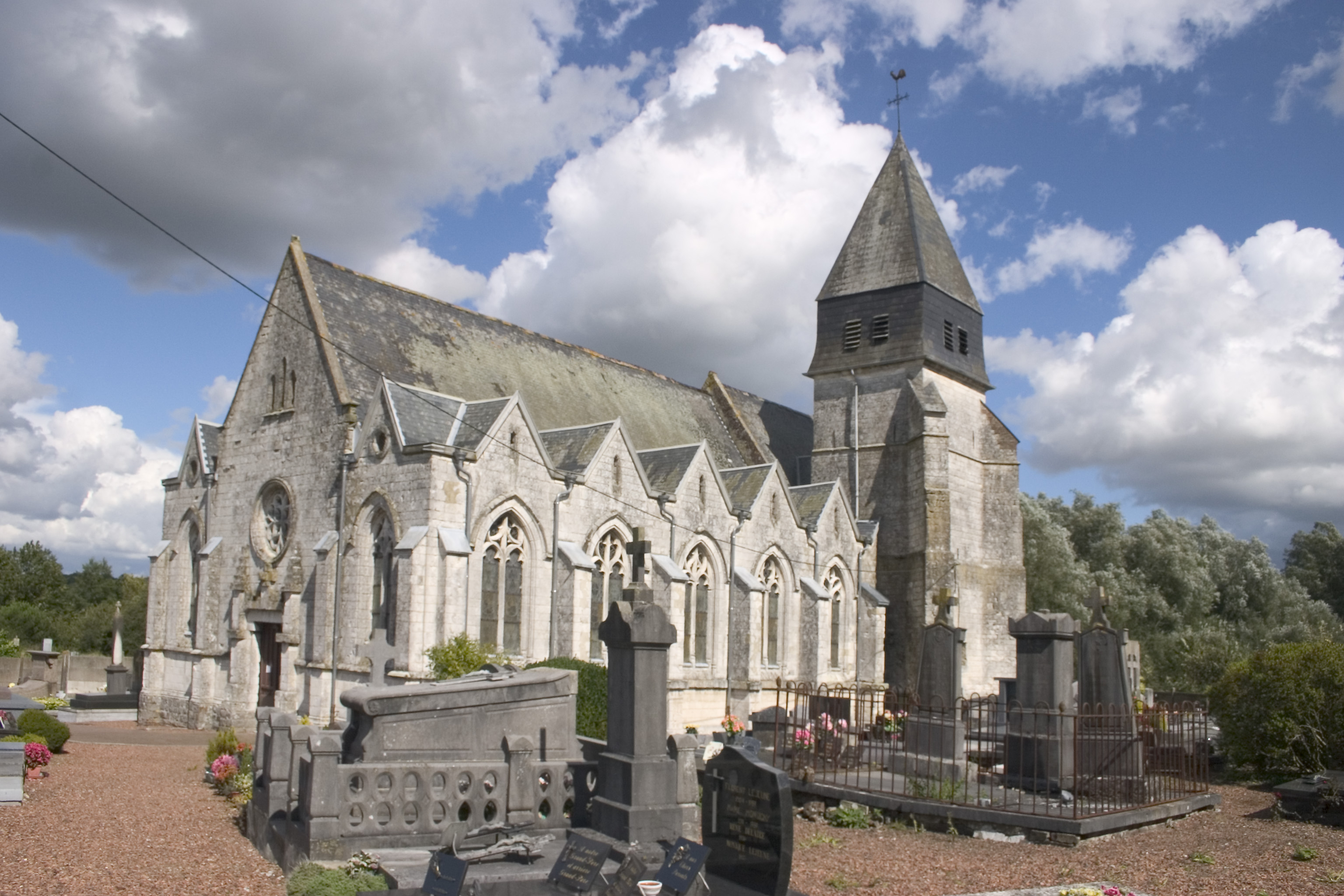
- The church of Anvin

- Coat of arms
- Location of Anvin
- Location within France Location within Hauts-de-France
- Coordinates: 50°26′50″N 2°15′22″E
- Country: France
- Region: Hauts-de-France
- Department: Pas-de-Calais
- Arrondissement: Arras
- Canton: Saint-Pol-sur-Ternoise
- Intercommunality: CC du Ternois

Government
  - Mayor (2020–2026): André Olivier
- Area^{1}: 7.83 km^{2} (3.02 sq mi)
- Elevation: 60 m (200 ft)
- Highest elevation: 150 m (490 ft)
- Lowest elevation: 51 m (167 ft)
- Population (2023): 700
  - Density: 89/km^{2} (230/sq mi)
- Time zone: UTC+01:00 (CET)
  - Summer (DST): UTC+02:00 (CEST)
- INSEE/Postal code: 62036 /62134
- ^{1} French Land Register data, which excludes lakes, ponds, glaciers > 1 km^{2} (0.386 sq mi or 247 acres) and river estuaries.

Anvin (French pronunciation: [ɑ̃vɛ̃]) is a commune in the Pas-de-Calais department in northern France.

== Geography ==
Anvin is a farming village located in the Ternoise river valley, 28 miles (44 km) northwest of Arras, at the junction of the D343, D70 and D94 roads.

== Population ==
The inhabitants are called Anvinois in French.

Historical population
Year	Pop.	±% p.a.
1968	615	—
1975	587	−0.66%
1982	639	+1.22%
1990	666	+0.52%
1999	741	+1.19%
2007	832	+1.46%
2012	792	−0.98%
2017	772	−0.51%
2023	700	−1.62%
Source: INSEE

== Sights ==
- The church of St. Leger, dating from the sixteenth century.
- The ruins of a seventeenth-century chateau.
- Vestiges of a watermill.

== Transport ==
The Chemin de fer d'Anvin à Calais opened a railway station at Anvin in 1881. The railway closed in 1952. Anvin station was also served by the SNCF. Although the line is still open to traffic, the station is closed.

== See also ==
- Communes of the Pas-de-Calais department

=== Sources ===
- Farebrother, Martin J B; Farebrother, Joan S (2008). Tortillards of Artois. Usk: The Oakwood Press. ISBN 978-0-85361-679-5.
