= Chemin de fer d'Anvin à Calais =

Railway in Pas-de-Calais, France

Chemin de Fer d'Anvin à Calais
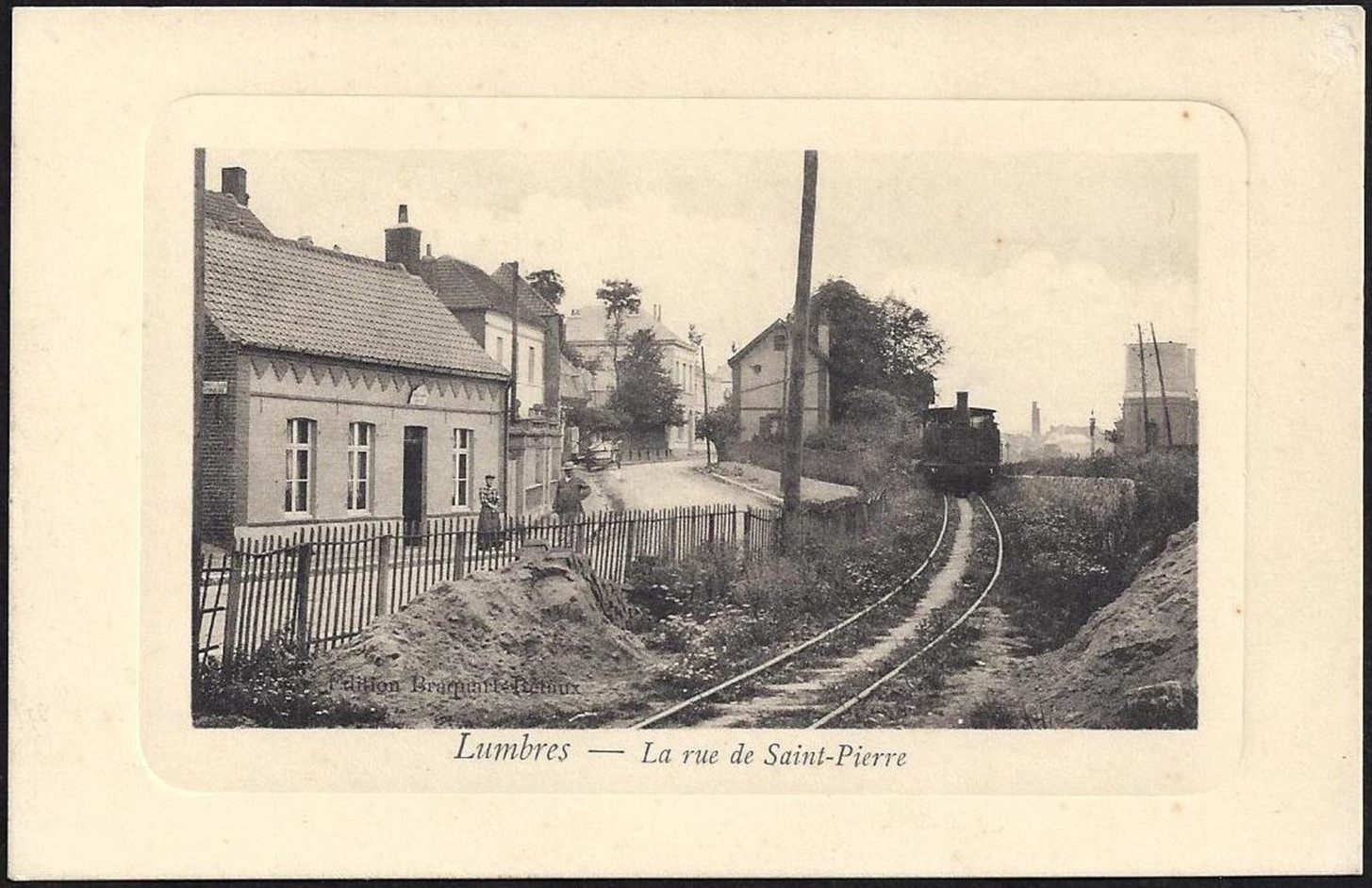
- A train near Lumbres

Overview
- Status: Closed
- Locale: Pas-de-Calais, France
- Termini: Calais; Anvin
- Stations: 39

History
- Opened: 1881
- Closed: 1955

Technical
- Line length: 95 kilometres (59.03 mi)
- Number of tracks: Single track
- Track gauge: 1,000 mm (3 ft 3 3/8 in) metre gauge
- Minimum radius: 100 metres (330 ft)

The Chemin de fer d'Anvin à Calais (French pronunciation: [ʃəmɛ̃ də fɛʁ dɑ̃vɛ̃ a kalɛ]) was a 1,000 mm (3 ft 3 3/8 in) metre gauge railway from Calais to Anvin, in the Pas-de-Calais department of France. It opened in 1881 and closed in 1955.

== Background ==
In France, the building of railways was controlled by the Government. This avoided the duplication of routes that was seen in the United Kingdom and meant that the large cities and towns were connected. The citizens of the smaller towns and villages also wanted railways to be built to connect them to the network. The departments were given authority to oversee the construction of these minor lines, some of which were built to standard gauge and others were built to metre gauge or less.

The Loi Migneret of 12 July 1865 established that railways in France were to be classified as of Intérêt Général or Intérêt Local. The former were deemed to be of sufficient importance that they could be partly charged to the state. The latter were charged to the department. The railway came under the control of the Pas-de-Calais department.

== History ==
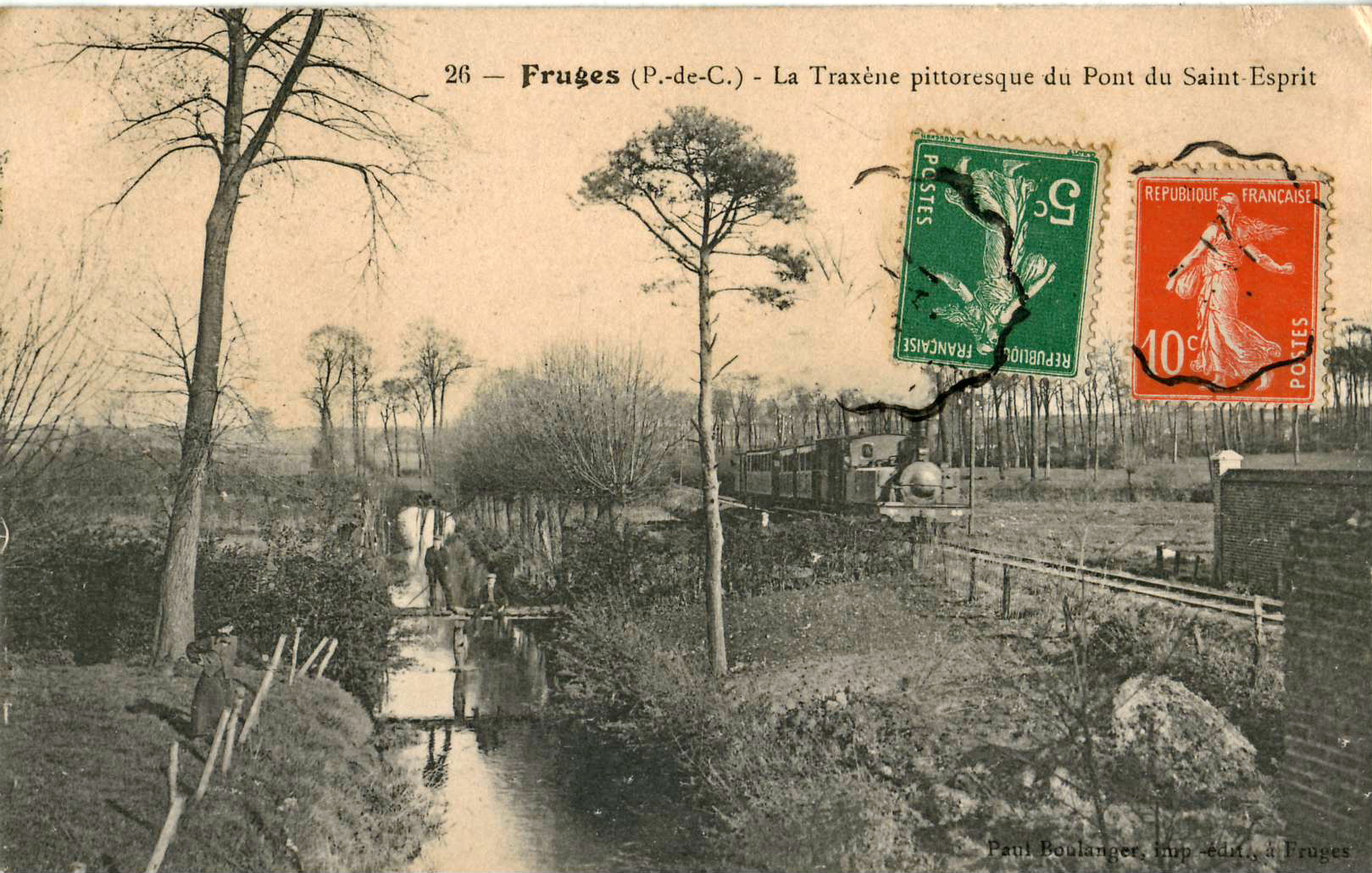
A train near Fruges.

In 1874, M. Émile Level proposed to build a railway from Calais to Anvin, Pas-de-Calais. Following the usual procedure, hearings in public would have been held before the proposed railway would have been declared to be of utilité publique (in the public interest) and permission granted to construct the line. The railway was the first line in Pas-de-Calais constructed under the Plan Freyciney. Anvin and Calais are 62 kilometres (38.53 mi) apart, but the railway was to be much longer due to the need to avoid heavy engineering and also to serve local communities. The line had a maximum gradient of 17mm/metre and curves of 100 metres (330 ft) minimum radius. In part, it ran through what is now the Parc naturel régional des Caps et Marais d'Opale, crossing many river valleys and having summits of 131 metres (430 ft) between Équirre and Verchin, and 177 metres (581 ft) at Alques-Buisson halte.

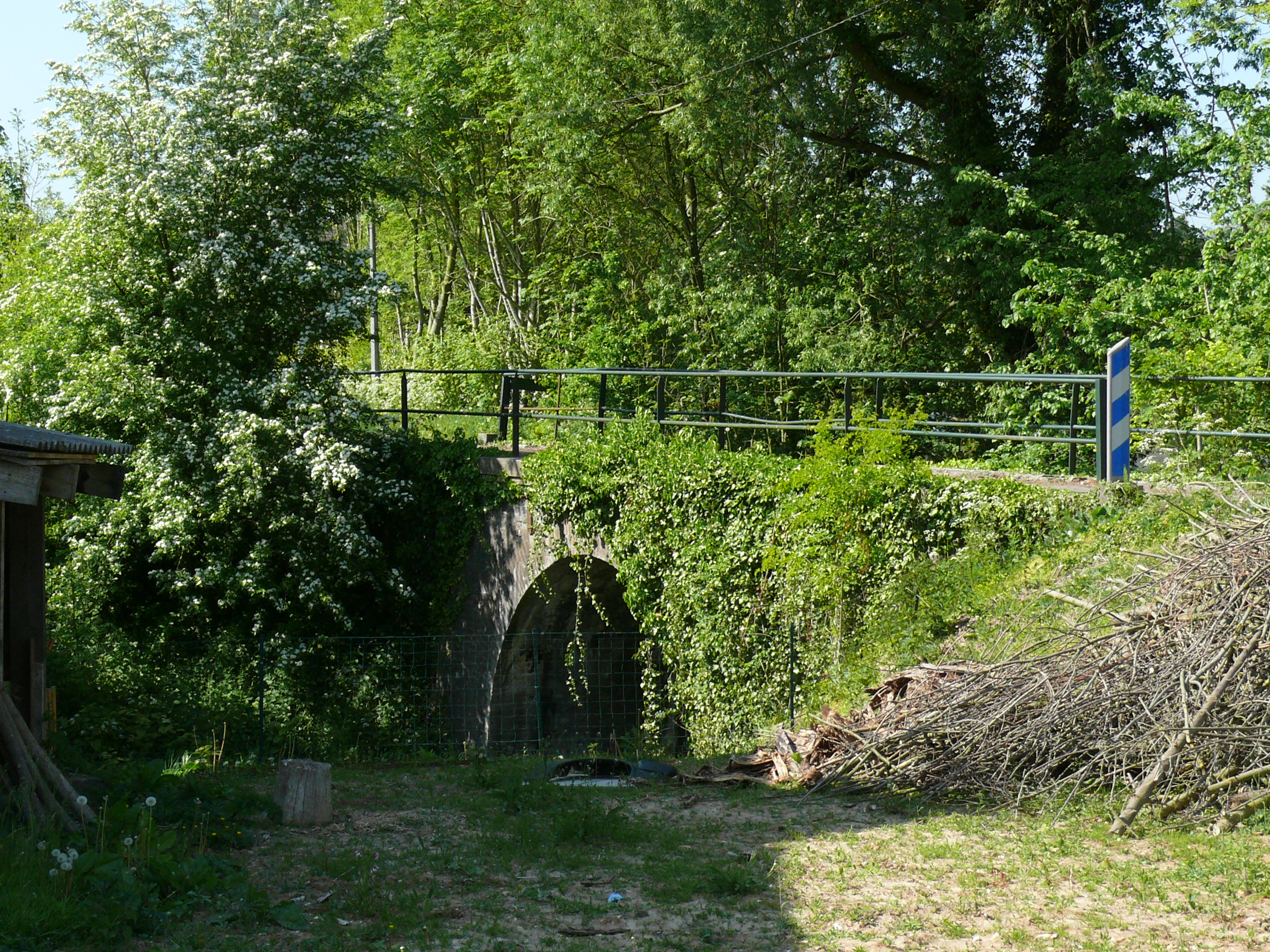
Bridge over the Bléquin near Lumbres.

Construction started from Anvin and Calais at the same time. the first section, from Calais Saint-Pierre to Guînes opened on 1 October 1881. Anvin to Fruges opened on 1 January 1881, followed by Fruges to Lumbres on 1 April. Guînes to Ardres on 1 July and Lumbres to Ardres on 10 August, giving the line a length of 94 kilometres (58.41 mi). A final 1 kilometre (1,100 yd) extension from Calais Saint-Pierre to Calais-Ville was made in 1900, which enabled the closure of Saint-Pierre station.

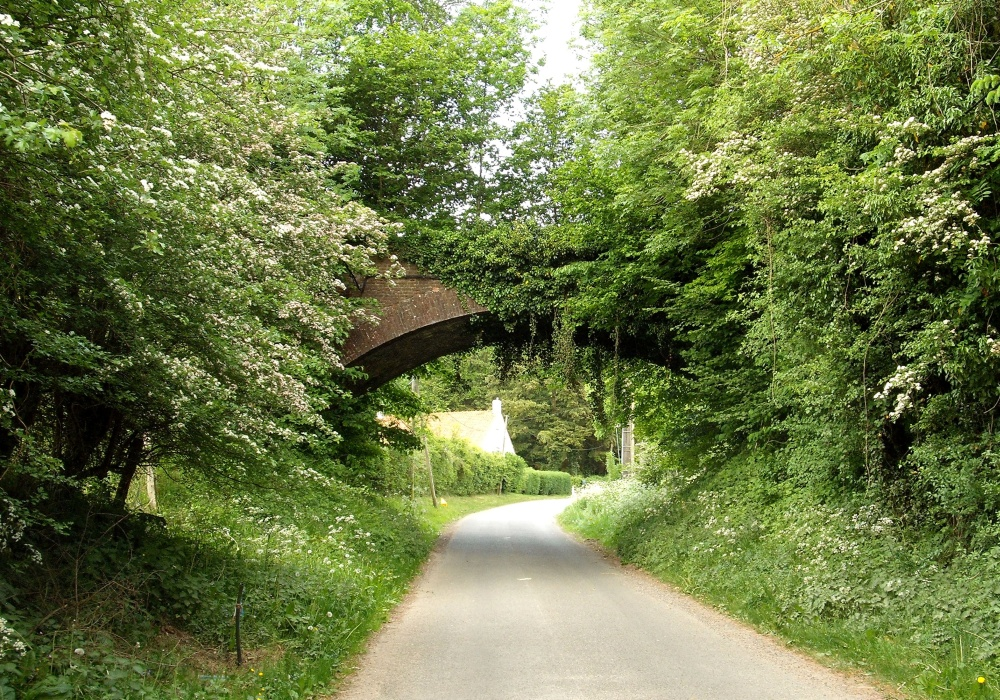
The bridge over the road at Bouvelinghem. Bouvelinghem Halte was on the right.

The line cost an average of ₣77,000 per kilometre to build. Rails were Vignole rails, 20 kilograms per metre (40 lb/yd) laid on oak sleepers. Wherever possible, earthworks were kept to a minimum, although the highest embankment was 9.53 metres (31 ft 3 in) and the deepest cutting was 8.14 metres (26 ft 8 in). Almost all road crossings were on the level. There were seven bridges and 161 level crossings. Most of the curves were greater than 130 metres (430 ft) radius, except for those at Lumbres and Fruges. Crossings with the CF du Nord railways were also on the level.

On 3 December 1882, a party of senators and deputies of the National Assembly spent the day inspecting the railway. In 1891, the Aire-Rimeux-Berck railway opened, connecting with the Anvin-Calais line at Gourgesson and Rimeux-Gournay. By 1893, both systems were being run interchangeably, with locomotives and stock from one line being used on the other.

In 1902, the Tramway à vapeur d'Ardres à Pont d'Ardres (TvAPA), operated by the railway, was opened between Ardres and Pont d'Ardres. Serving Messrs Sat et Compagnie's sugar refinery at Pont d'Ardres.

In 1906, it was recommended that a halt be provided at Berthem, where there was a sand quarry. The commune offered to finance it, but the company did not want to provide a stop. The department authorities stated that the railway could not be forced to provide a station and the matter dropped.

Total passenger volume in 1911 was 720,474 passengers. The area remained behind Allied lines during World War I. A major British Army base was established at Calais in 1915. Most of the railway line fell within a security zone known as the Reserved Zone: civilians living within this zone had free travel within the canton in which they lived, but to travel beyond their canton, or in and out of the Reserved Zone, a sauf-conduit (identity card) was required. Civilian passengers had to leave their train and go into the station building to have their papers checked when crossing Cantons. A procedure which led to complaints as some passengers missed their train when it departed whilst their papers were being checked. Military personnel had their papers checked on board the train. Services were reduced in frequency, with military and freight traffic taking priority.

In 1917, a major supply camp was established at Vendroux, occupying land between the Anvin-Calais line at the adjacent Chemin de fur du Nord lines between Coulogne and Écluse-Carrée, and the Canal de Guînes. In 1918, facilities were provided to allow for the transhipment of timber between both lines just north of Écluse-Carrée. The timber was brought in from Balinghem. The railway in this area was made dual gauge with standard gauge for 1.7 kilometres (1.06 mi) from the Calais end to Vendroux. During 1918, various minor works were carried out at a number of stations. Some loops which had been removed were reinstated and various sidings and passing loops were added. Between May and July 1918, a Metre gauge line was laid alongside the Standard gauge line from Anvin to Teneur, a distance of 2 kilometres (1.24 mi) where a transhipment depôt was constructed. in 1918, a line was constructed by the British Army from Tournehem-sur-la-Hem to Saint-Momelin. It saw little use, but was still being maintained by the British Army in March 1919.

At the end of the war, the railway was suffering from locomotives that were under maintained, and some of its rolling stock having been moved to other lines during the war. On the other hand, it had gained some rolling stock from other lines and there was captured German rolling stock which had been declared a prize of war available. Locomotive deficiences due to the war would affect the company until 1925. In 1919, the line was acquired by the Compagnie Générale des Voies Ferrées d'Intérêt Local (VFIL), along with the TvAPA, the Aire-Ribeux-Berck and the Flanders railways in the Nord department. It was at about this time that the line from Tournehem-sur-la-Hem to Saint-Momelin was dismantled. Reasons for it not being absorbed into the VFIL network were probably a lack of civilian infrastructure, and the fact that it linked with lines under the control of the Société Général des Chemins de Fer Economiques (SE), which showed little interest in the line either. In 1919, all passenger services were provided by mixed trains. At that time, it was not possible to make a return journey between Anvin and Calais or vice versa on the same day.

In 1921, the VFIL acquired five locomotives from the CF Guise-Hirson, which had been converted to Standard gauge during the war and a decision had been made that it would remain so. Thus its rolling stock was available. Three 2-6-0T locomotives and two 2-10-0T locomotives were bought. The 2-10-0T locomotives required that various bridges were strengthened before they could be brought into service. They were restricted to working between Lumbres and Bonningues. Twelve bogie carriages, 62 wagons, 22 vans, 40 open or flat wagons and a crane were bought from the CF Guise-Hirson. A further 29 freight wagons would be purchased at a later date. Responding to complaints of late running in 1922, VFIL's departmental engineer stated that this was due to locomotive maintenance issues caused by the war.

In 1924, three more 2-6-0T locomotives were bought. Also in that year, two railcars with 45 horsepower (34 kW) Renault-Scemia petrol engines entered service. RS1 was owned by VFIL, and RS2 was owned by the department. Both seated 25, with 15 standing. One of them was initially put into service on the TvAPA but by 1926 both were in use between Anvin and Fruges. The 1924-25 sugar beet season saw an abundant crop. The 2-10-0T locomotives were of great use in taking beet to the sucreries.

In 1930, the VFIL abolished third class. Third class carriages were reclassified as second class. In 1931, an 0-6-0+0-6-0T Mallet locomotive was bought. It was restricted to operating between Anvin and Guînes. In 1932, VFIL built a railcar at Lumbres. It was fitted with a 65 horsepower (48 kW) De Dion JMH petrol engine. Numbered ARB2, it seated 28 with twelve standing. Another railcar, numbered CGL1 was built at about this time. In 1933 railcars RS1 and RS2 were rebuilt at Lumbres. RS1 was shortened and fitted with at 65 horsepower (48 kW) Unic diesel engine. It was renumbered CGL11. RS2 was fitted with an 85 horsepower (63 kW) Berliot diesel engine. It was renumbered PdC101. In 1934–35, five more railcars were built at Lumbres. These were fitted with 65 horsepower (48 kW) Unic M24 diesel engines. Numbered ARB3-5 and CGL6-7, they seated 29 with eleven standing. All railcars were second class only.

By 1939, the line was almost breaking even, despite increased competition from road transport. World War II broke out on 3 September, with Calais falling into German hands on 25 May 1940. The Pas-de-Calais department became a zone of special control, administered by the Oberkommando der Wehrmacht in Brussels, Belgium. Along the coast was the "red zone". It was said that French law did not apply in this zone. Under the terms of the armistice, France was to hand over its railways to the Germans undamaged and was to work with the German authorities to restore them to serviceable condition. In 1942, the Marine Verpflegungsamt (MVA) took control of the workshops at Lumbres, which it used for the maintenance of requisitioned rolling stock. Work on requisitioned stock was given priority over non-requisitioned stock In the spring of 1943, the Germans constructed a branch line at Verchin. It was capable of handling 750 tonnes of traffic a day. In the summer of 1943, the railway applied to the department to reduce its services as some of its locomotives had been requisitioned by the MVA. Only two railcars were in use, one of which had been converted to run on gas. The other was one of the diesel engined railcars. A shortage of fuel prevented the others from being uses and a shortage of materials prevented further conversions to gas. Eight steam locomotives were out of service, with five, including the Mallet, deemed "probably not repairable". By August 1943, a further three steam locomotives were out of service, having been damaged by machine gun fire in Allied air attacks. Civilian passenger services had been reduced by half the previous month. In November, the MVA further strengthened its control over the railway. The line was used to transport materials for the construction of V-1 flying bomb launch sites. A storage tunnel for V1s at Bergueneuse was connected by rail, almost certainly with a branch to the Anvin-Calais system. On 25 June 1944 the V1 launch site at Rimieux was heavily bombed. Over 200 metres (220 yd) of track was damaged and the hamlet was destroyed.

The Allies liberated Calais between 27 and 30 September 1944. Calais-Ville station had been severely damaged in 1940, and further damaged in 1944. The remaining station building were demolished and temporary buildings erected to serve until the station was rebuilt. This would occur until 1955, by which point the Anvin-Calais railway had closed.

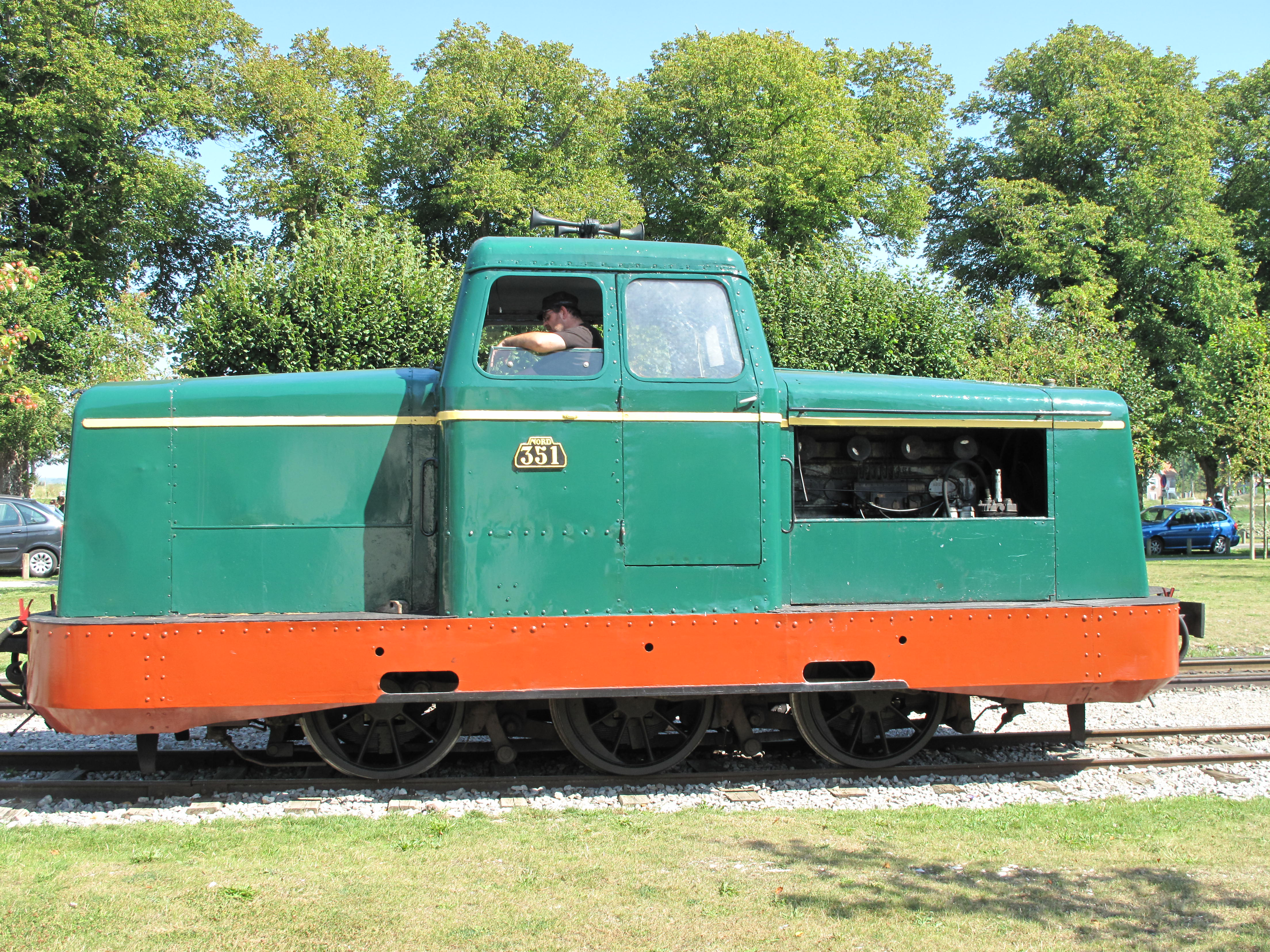
Locomotive No. 351, built at Lumbres in 1948.

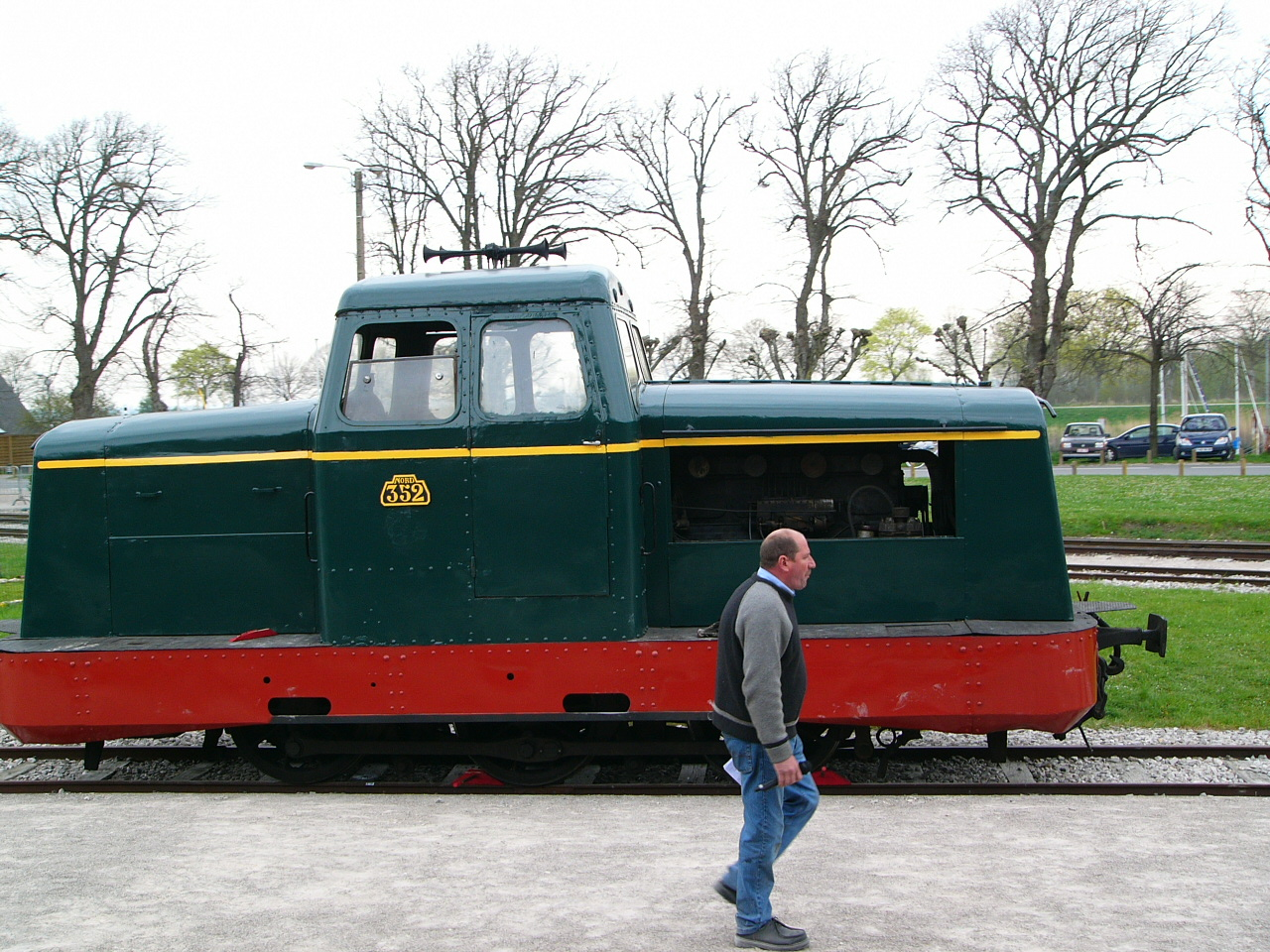
Locomotive № 352, built at Lumbres in 1948.

Services in 1945 were very restricted even worse than they had been in 1944. The through service from Anvin to Calais was not reinstated post-war. In 1947, locomotive No. 13 was transferred to the VFIL Oise network. It is preserved at the MTVS, Butry-sur-Oise, Oise. In 1948, the workshops at Lumbres built an 0-6-0 diesel locomotive using the chassis of a steam locomotive. Fitted with a 180 horsepower (130 kW) Willème engine, it was numbered 301. It is preserved on the Chemin de Fer de la Baie de Somme (CFBS). Two 6-wheeled diesel locomotives were built in 1948 for the VFIL Flandres network. They were numbered 351 and 352. They are also preserved at the CFBS. In 1948, several stations became unstaffed on Sundays, with the tokens being altered to take this into account. In 1949/50, two Billard A80D1 railcars were bought from the CF Dordogne, with a third, engineless, railcar for use as a trailer.

In 1951, a Billard A80D2 railcar was bought from the Chemin de fer de la Vendée. In 1951/52 two Billard A150D6 railcars and three trailers were bought from the Tramways d'Ille-et-Vilaine. On 31 September 1952, the Anvin-Fruges section was closed to all traffic. In 1945–55, railcar CGL1 was rebuilt at Lumbres. It re-entered service in February 1955. The last trains ran on 28 February 1955 with the remainder of the line closing on 1 March. Bus services would replace passenger trains and the SNCF provided a freight service using lorries. Many steam locomotives were scrapped at Lumbres in 1956. The railcars were sold. CGL1 was sold to the SE for use on the Réseau des Bains de Mer (RBM) and is now preserved on the CFBS. M41 went to the VFIL Oise, M42-43 went to the VFIL Flandres. The Billard A80D1s went to the CF de Corrèze whilst the Billard A80D2 went to the VFIL Oise. The Billard A150D6s and the R210 trailers went to the CFD du Tarn. Locomotive 301 was sold to the CF Ardennes. When that line closed in 1961, it was sold to the SE for use on the RBM and is now preserved on the CFBS. Locomotives 650-52 were also sold to the CF Ardennes. On closure, two were sold to a cement works at Haubourdin, Nord and the other to a steel works at Isbergues. All three were scrapped in 1975.

== Operation ==
The line was operated on a token system. Unusually for France, where a paper token was the norm for minor lines, brass tokens were in use. If two or more trains were to travel in the same direction, a paper token was issued to all but the last train, which carried the brass token. Trains had a crew of three: the conducteur or chef de train (guard), who was in overall charge of the train, the chauffeur (fireman) and the mécanicien (driver). At stations, the departure of a train would be signalled by the station master blowing a whistle. The conducteur then blew a small trumpet to indicate that he agreed the train was ready to depart, and the mécanicien then started the train. No through ticketing arrangement existed with the CF du Nord.

== Accidents and incidents ==
There were many accidents and incidents on the line. Most were of a minor nature, but a few were more serious.

- On 6 April 1894, a child fell between two carriages of a train that was departing from Guînes and was killed. As it was the annual fair day in Guînes, the train comprised seventeen carriages. This was partly attributed to the cause of the accident because the mécanicien was unaware that a problem had occurred. The subsequent inquiry revealed that the child's father's ticket had an irregularity. The company decided not to pursue the issue, saying that he had suffered enough.
- On 28 April 1886, a train collided with a carrier's horse-drawn vehicle on a level crossing at Brêmes. Two horses were killed and the train was derailed. The carrier sued the railway, which pointed out that his cart was unlit and that the train had whistled on approach to the crossing. It also pointed out that a ruling made in 1882 absolved the railway from liability for damage caused to livestock. No compensation was paid.
- On 16 November 1889, a railway worker was killed at level crossing No. 97, near Lumbres. An enquiry revealed that previous safety concerns had been raised about this crossing.
- On 5 March 1932, a motor car and a railcar collided on a level crossing at Verchin. A passenger in the motor car was killed. The driver of the motor car was prosecuted in the local Tribunal correctionel (Magistrate's Court) for causing her death and the railway company sued him for damages caused to their train and infrastructure. Evidence was given that he had sounded his horn and been travelling slowly as required by the regulations, and the railcar was travelling "at speed". He was acquitted and the claim for damages was dismissed. Following another accident at that level crossing, the mayor of Verchin tried to impose a speed limit of 5 kilometres per hour (3 mph) on trains at that crossing. The railway pointed out that only the préfet of the department could impose such a restriction, that motor vehicles were not supposed to exceed 15 kilometres per hour (9 mph) within 100 metres (110 yd) of a level crossing, and that trains had priority over road traffic at ungated crossings.
- On 8 August 1938, a lorry collided with the rear of a railcar on a level crossing at Brêmes. Four passengers were injured, two seriously. The lorry driver was blamed as the railcar was fully on the level crossing when the accident occurred. A recommendation was made that the speed limit for railcars be reduced from 35 kilometres per hour (22 mph) to 15 kilometres per hour (9 mph) and that warning signs should be improved.

== Stations ==
Type 1 stations were located in the chief towns of cantons which did not have a standard gauge railway. These were of a standard design with a two-storey main building and a single story wing for freight. Type 2 stations were similar to type 1 but smaller. These were located at smaller towns. Halts just had a single storey building, all of which were later extended. Arrêts were provided with a small shelter.

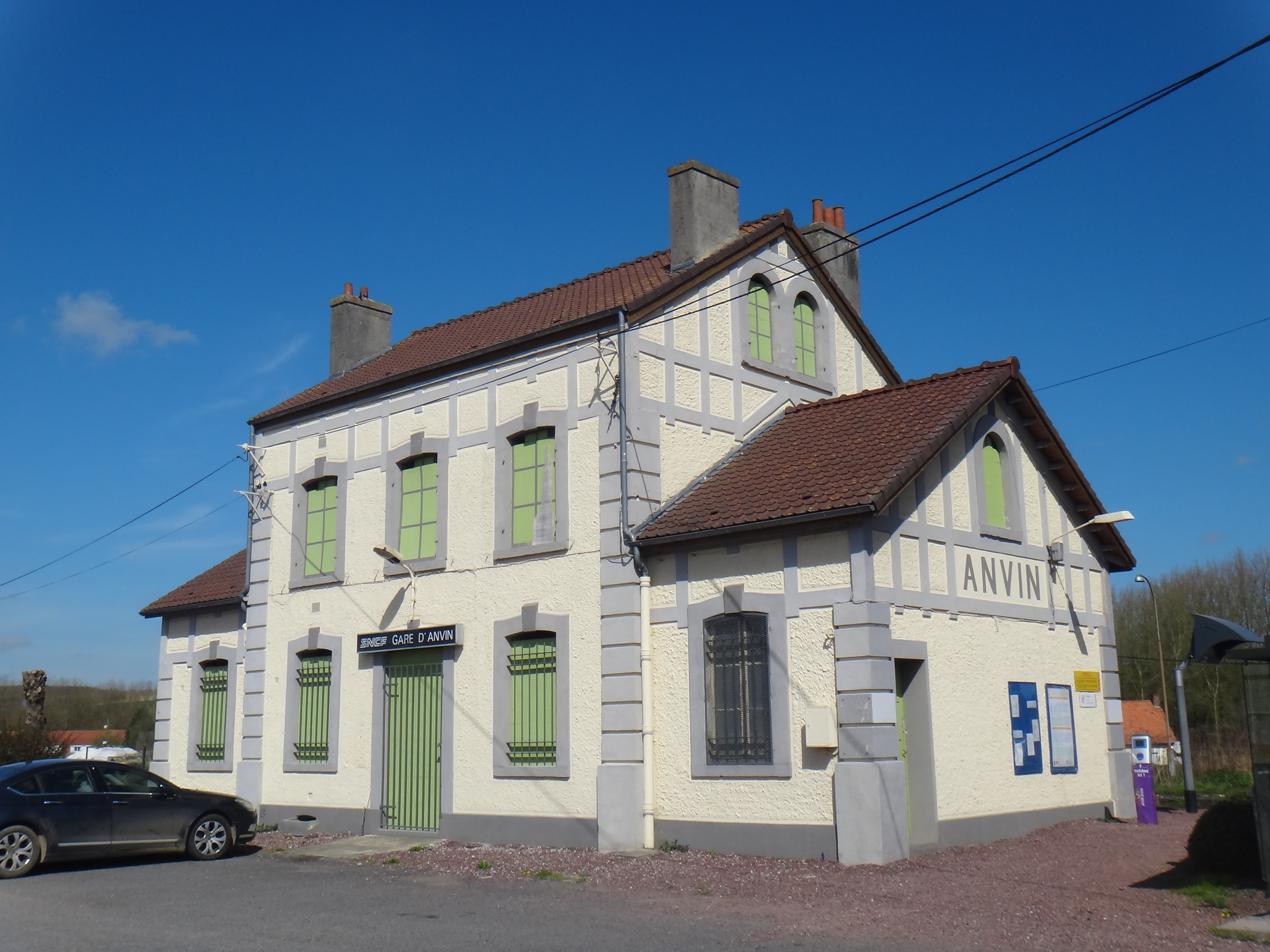
Anvin station

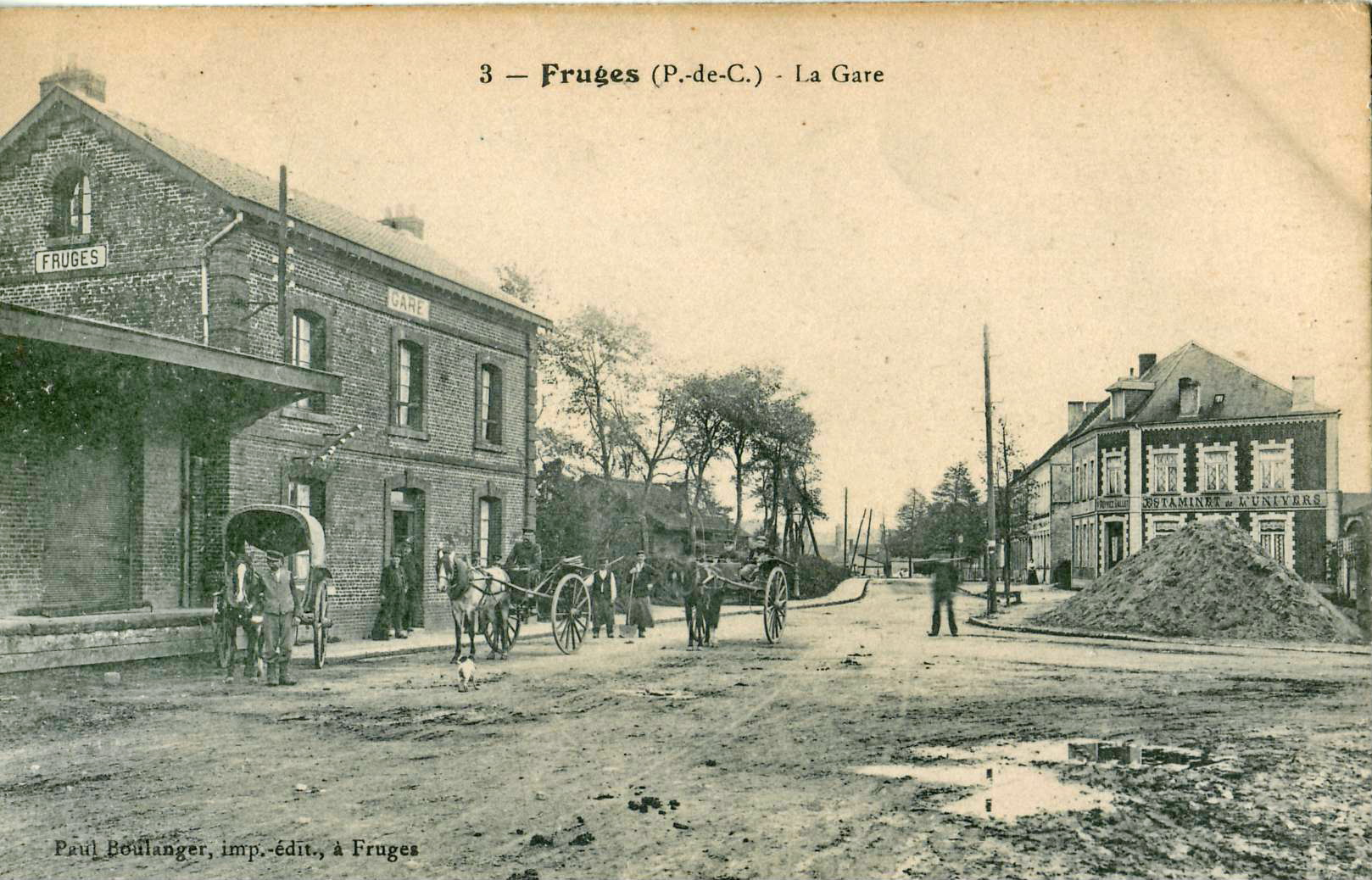
Fruges

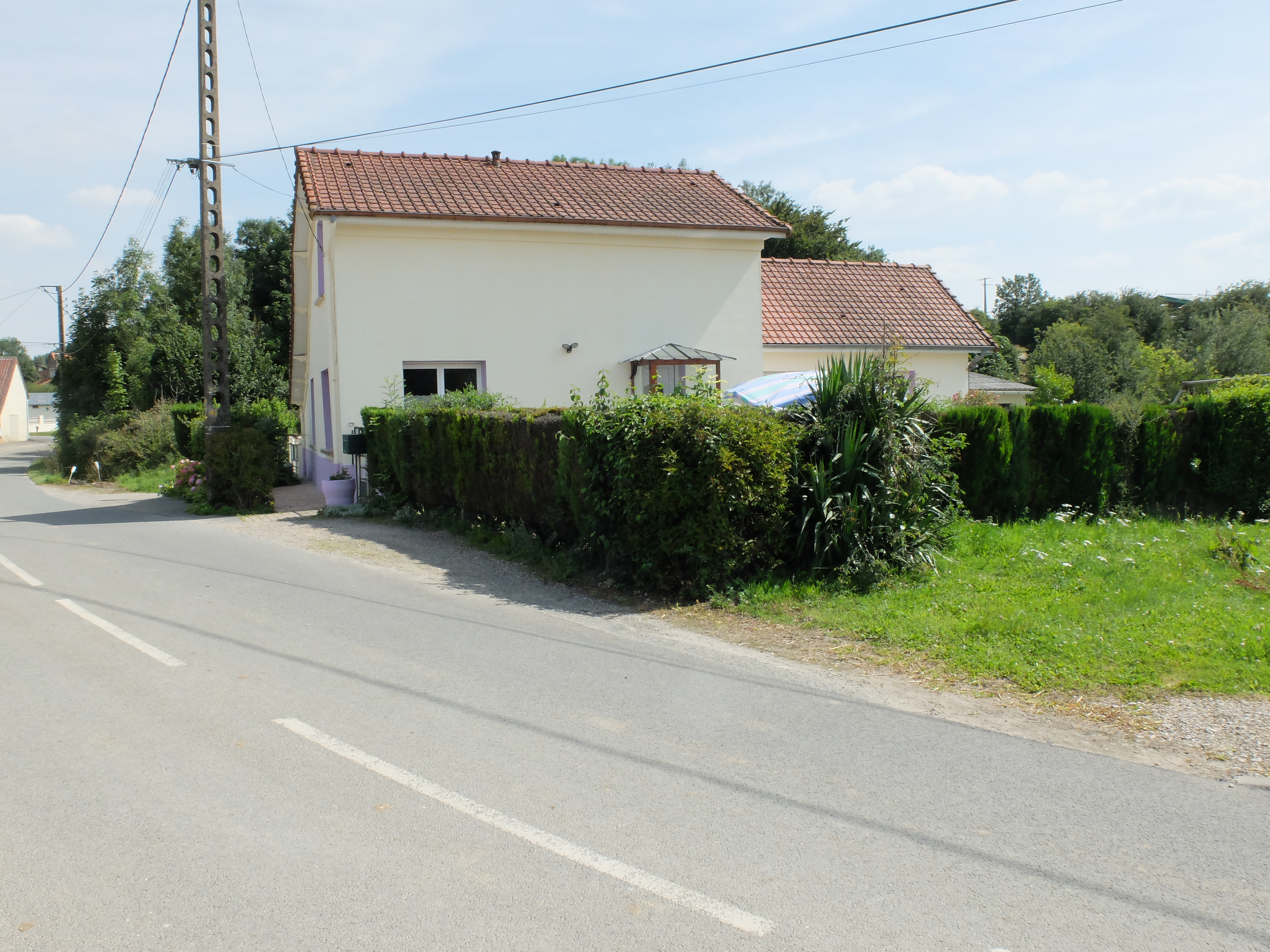
The surviving station building at Coupelle-Veille.

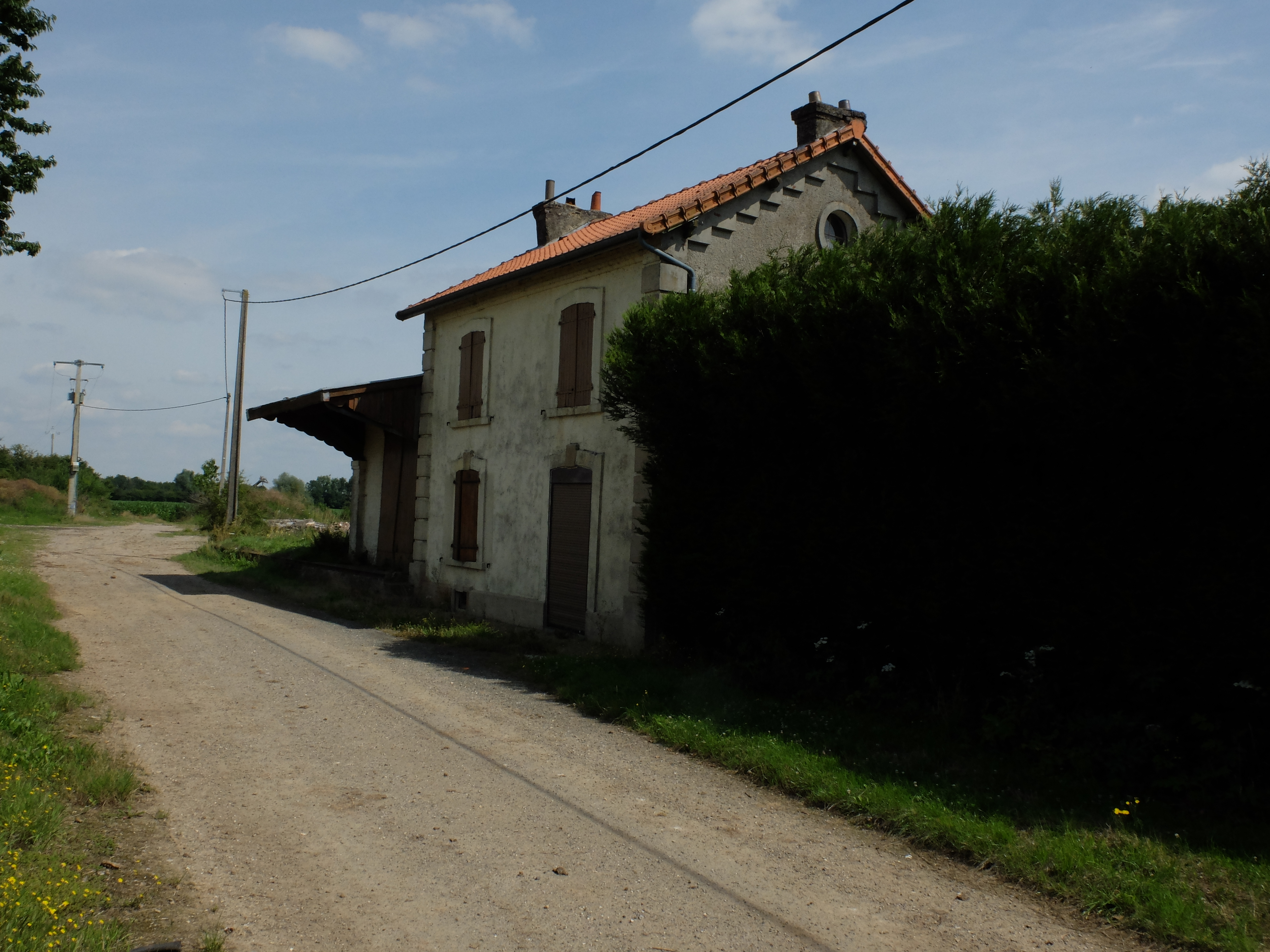
The surviving station building at Rimeux-Gournay.

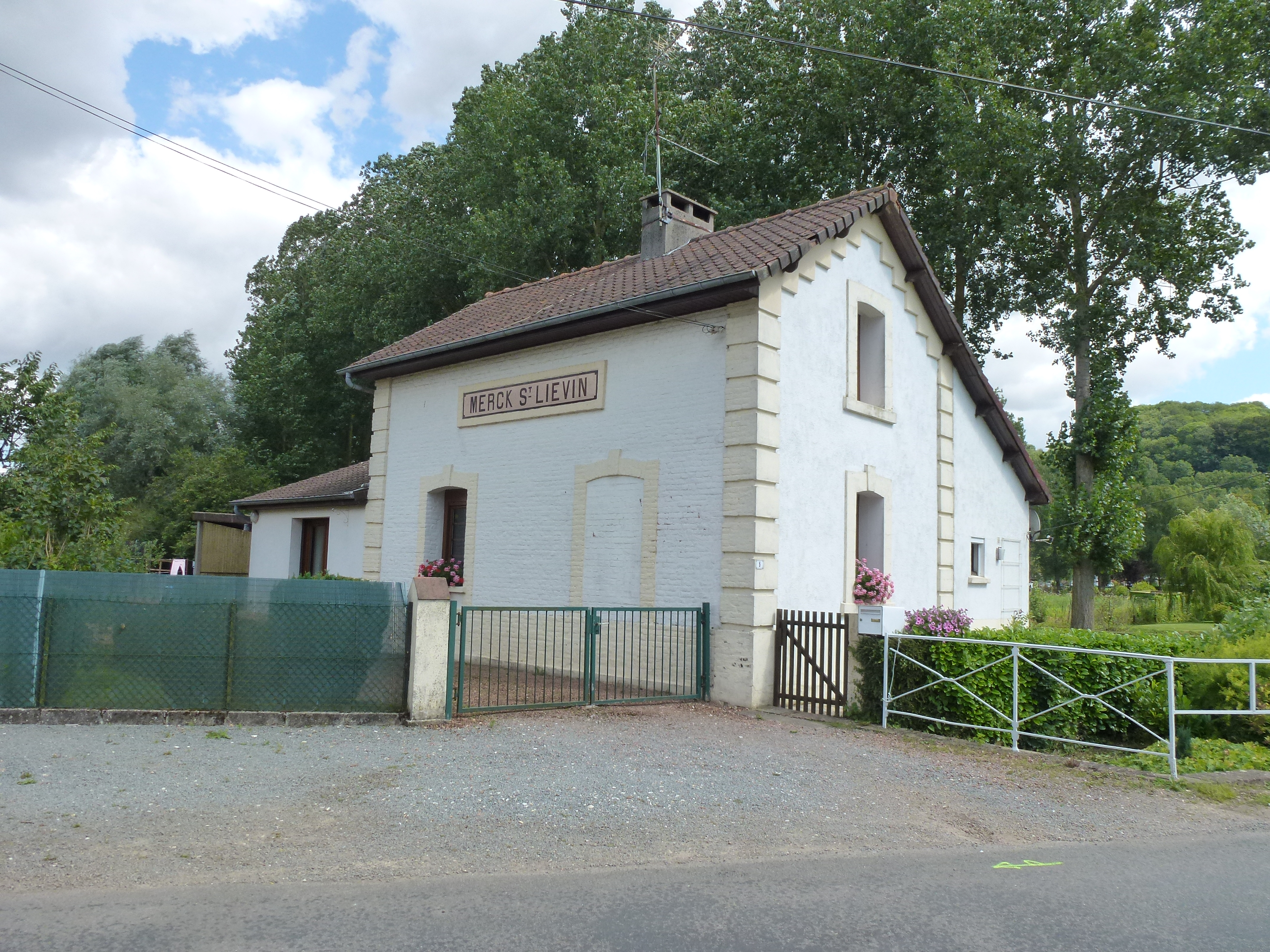
The surviving station building at Merck-Saint-Liévin.

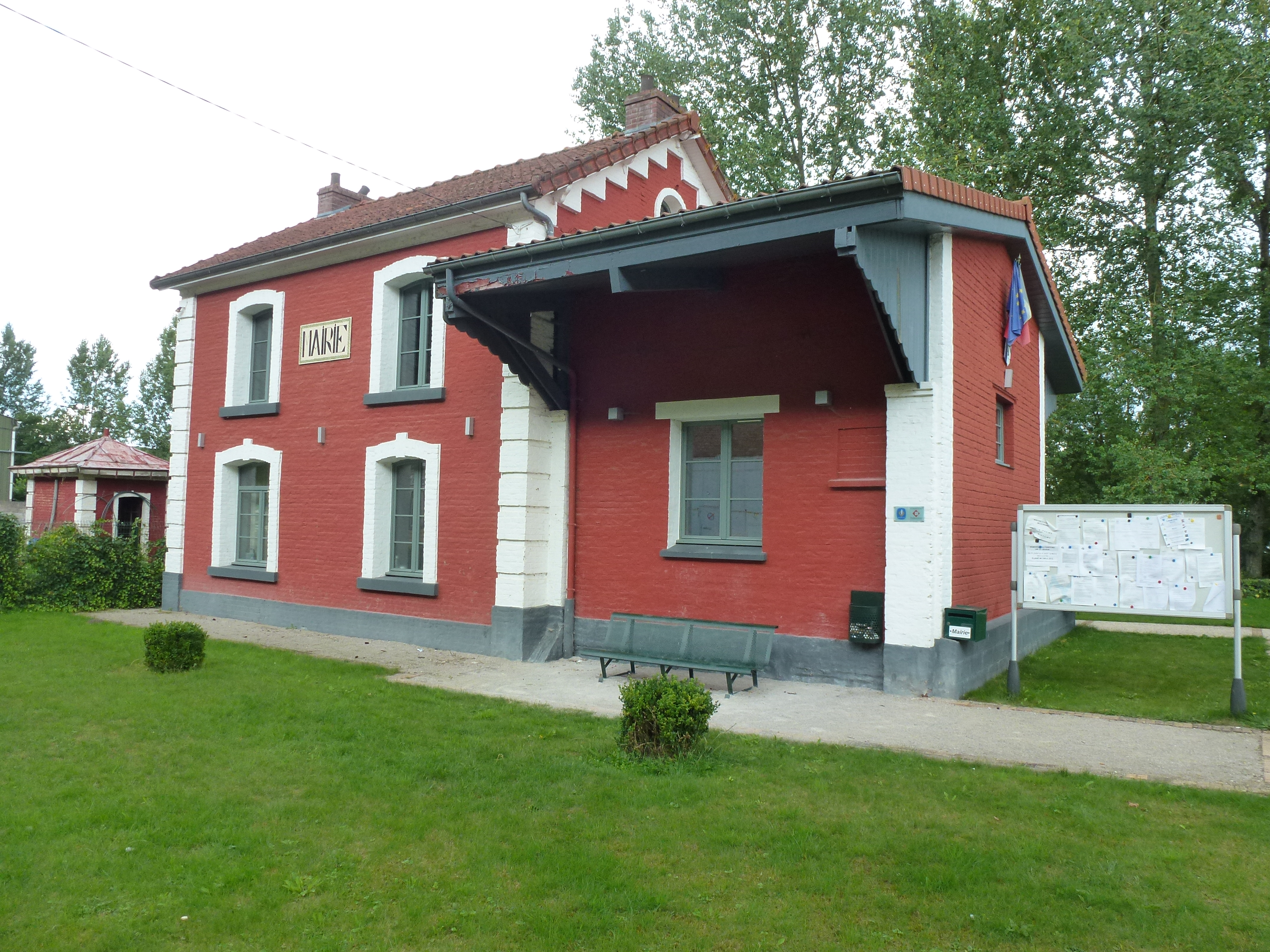
The surviving station building at Remilly-Wirquin.

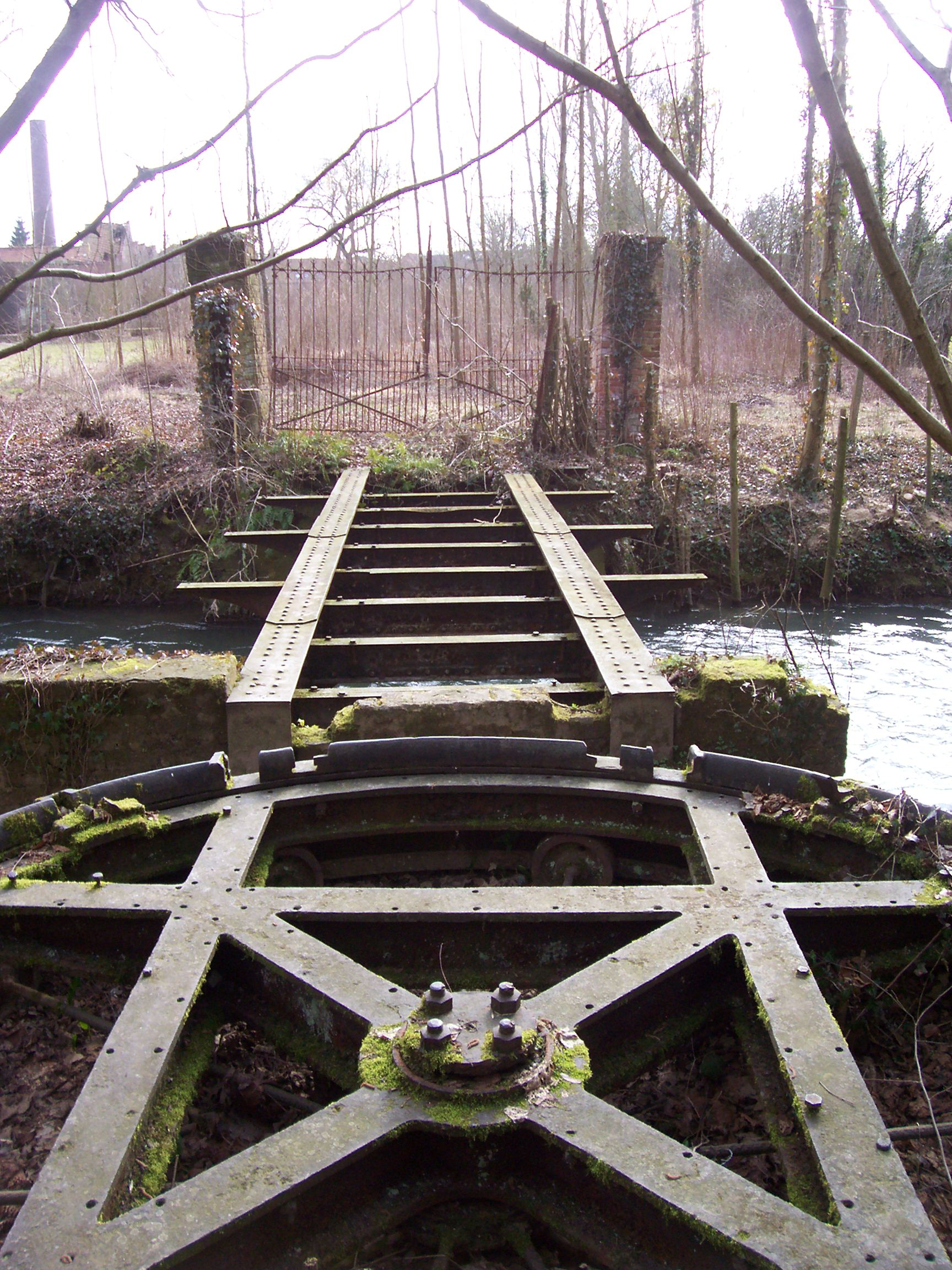
This bridge over the Aa and turntable once served Messrs Avot's paper mill at Wavrans,

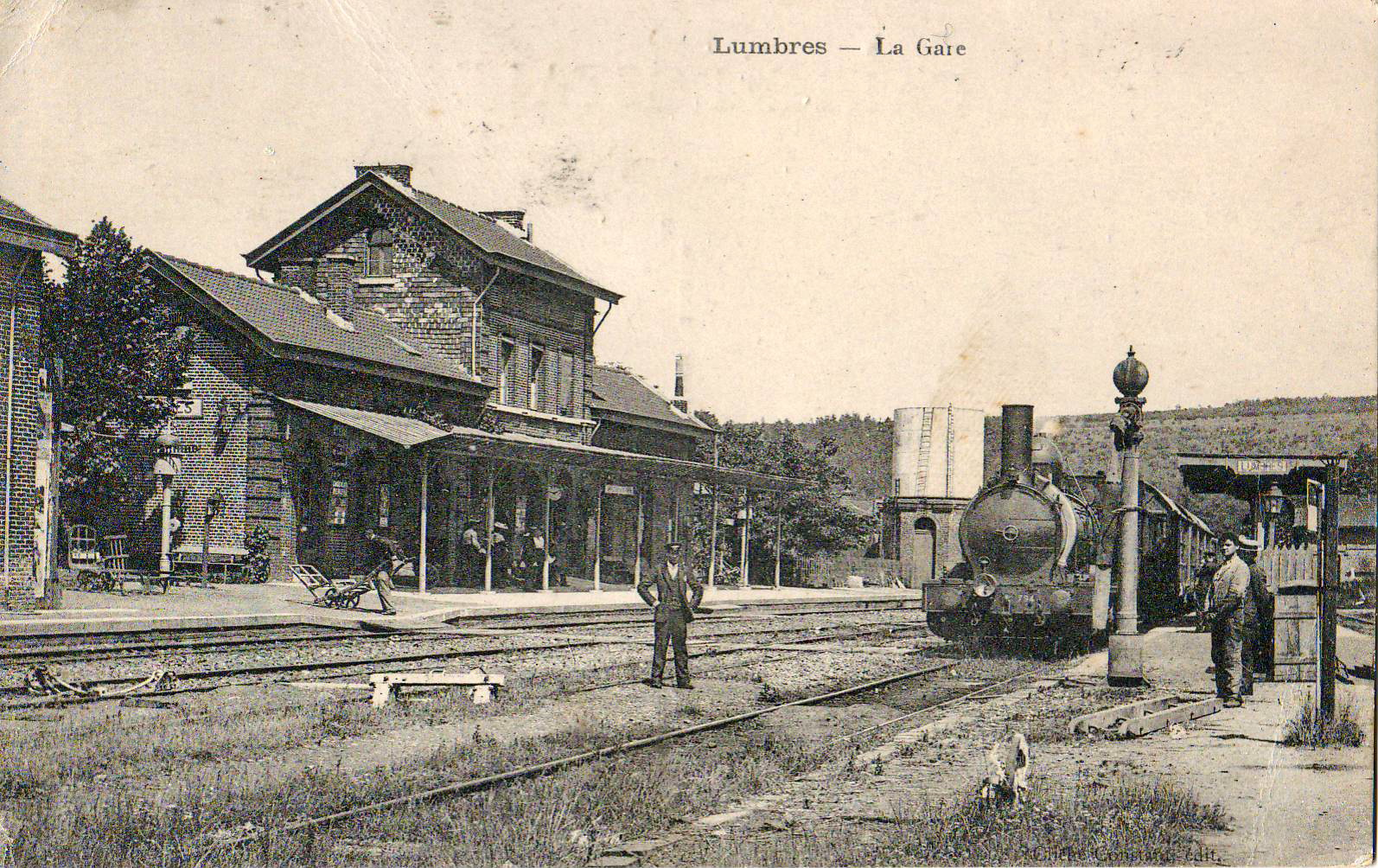
Lumbres station, metre gauge lines at extreme right.

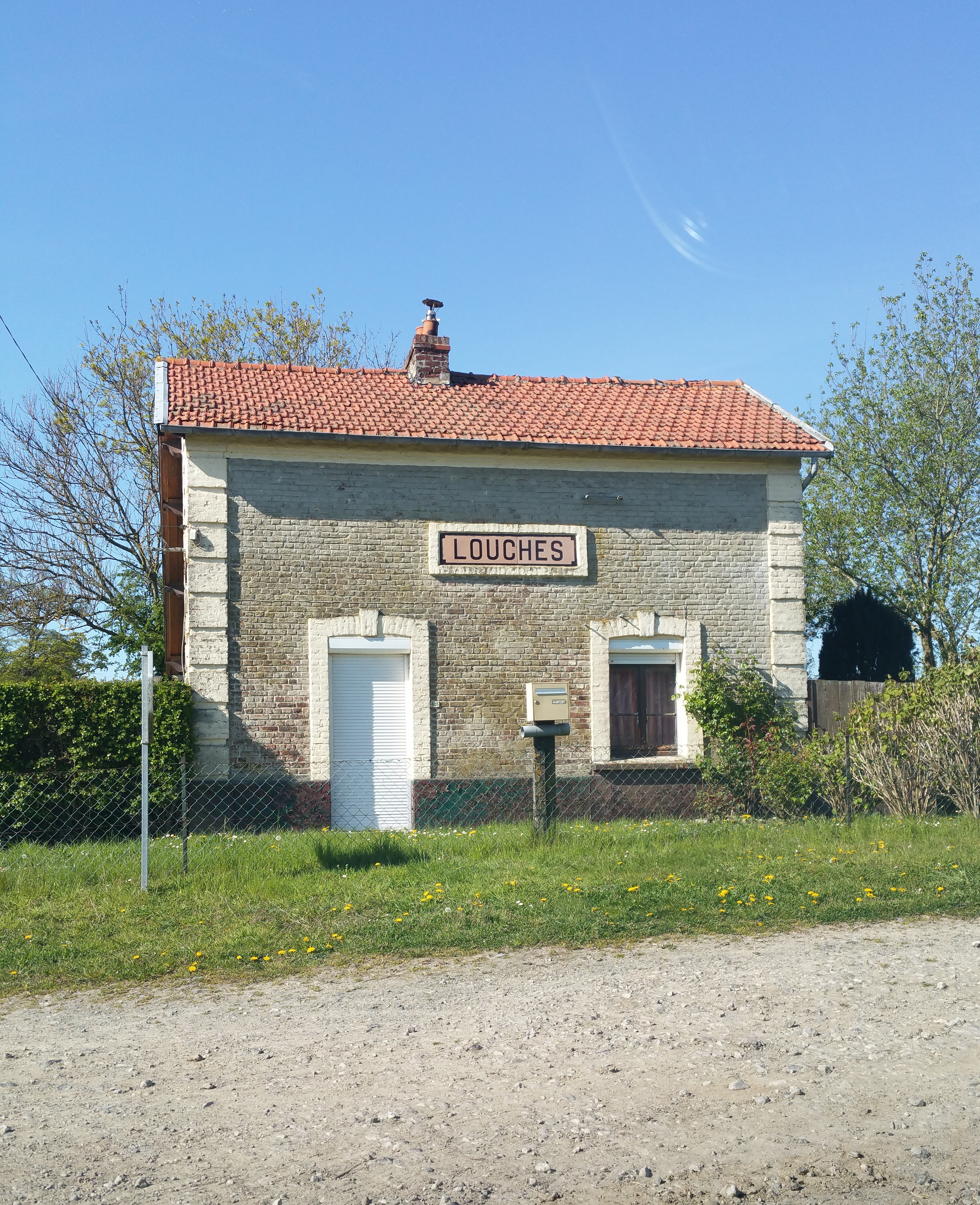
The surviving station building at Louches.

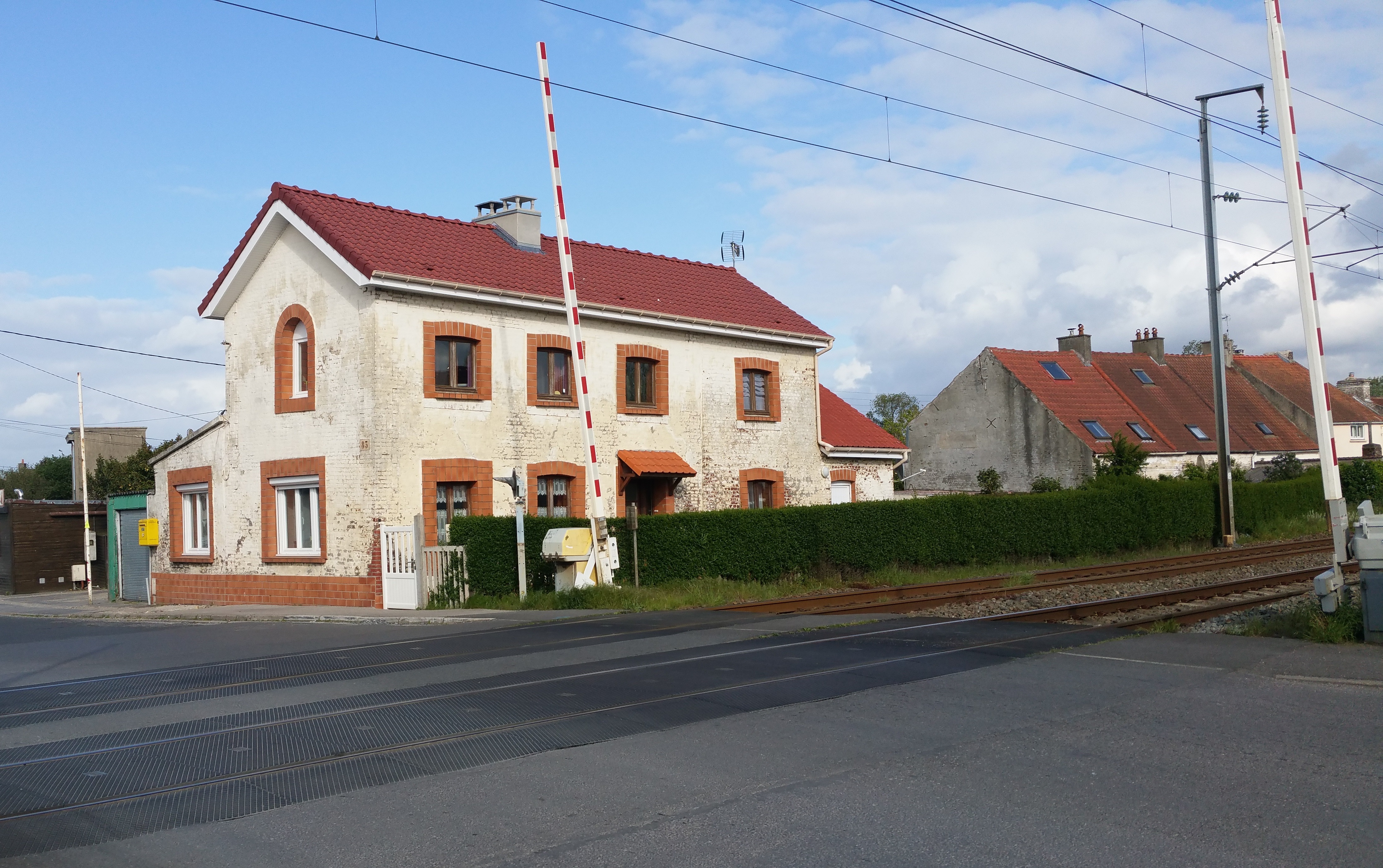
The surviving station building at Coulogne. The metre gauge line would have been nearest the station.

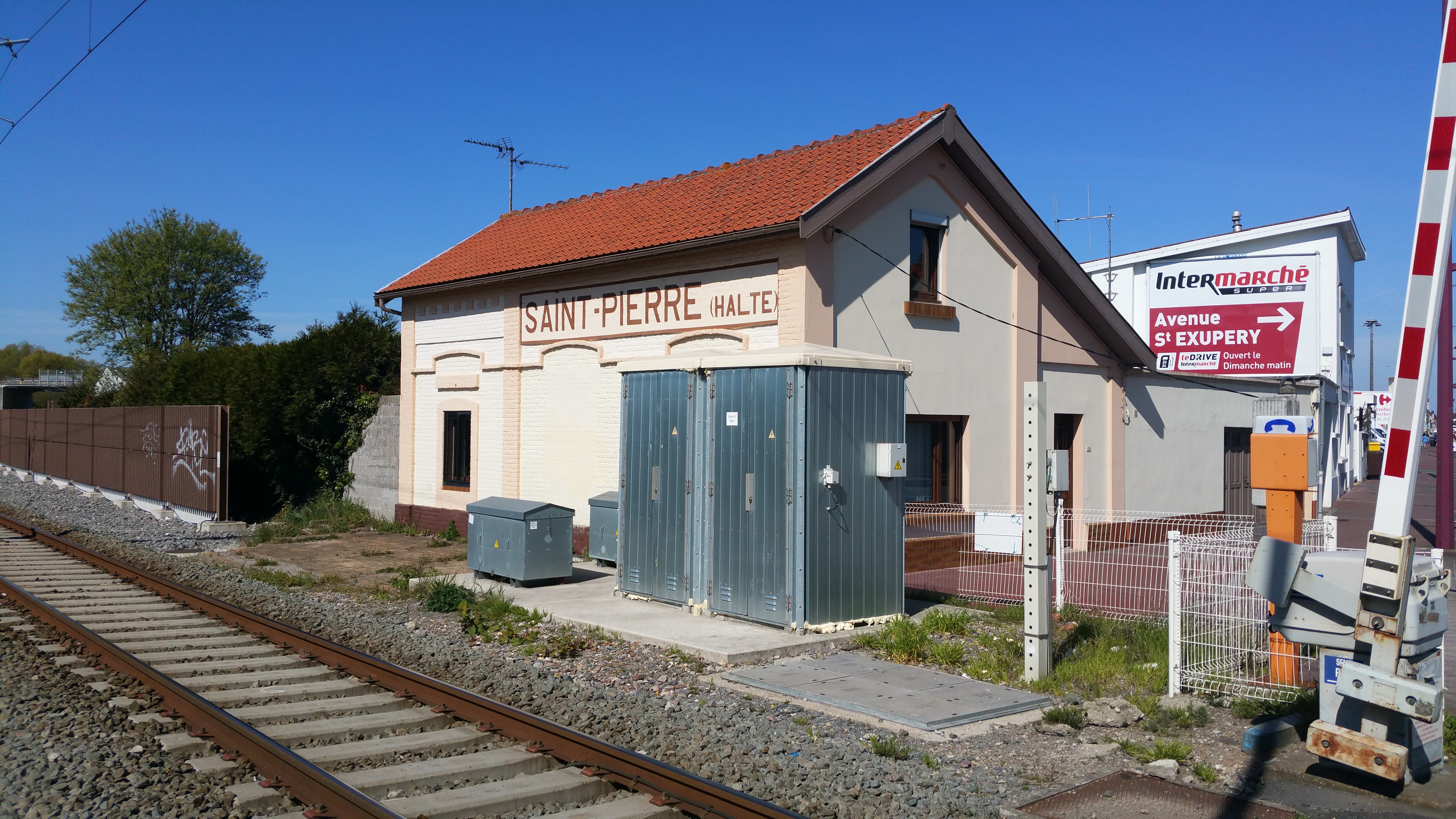
Calais Saint-Pierre.

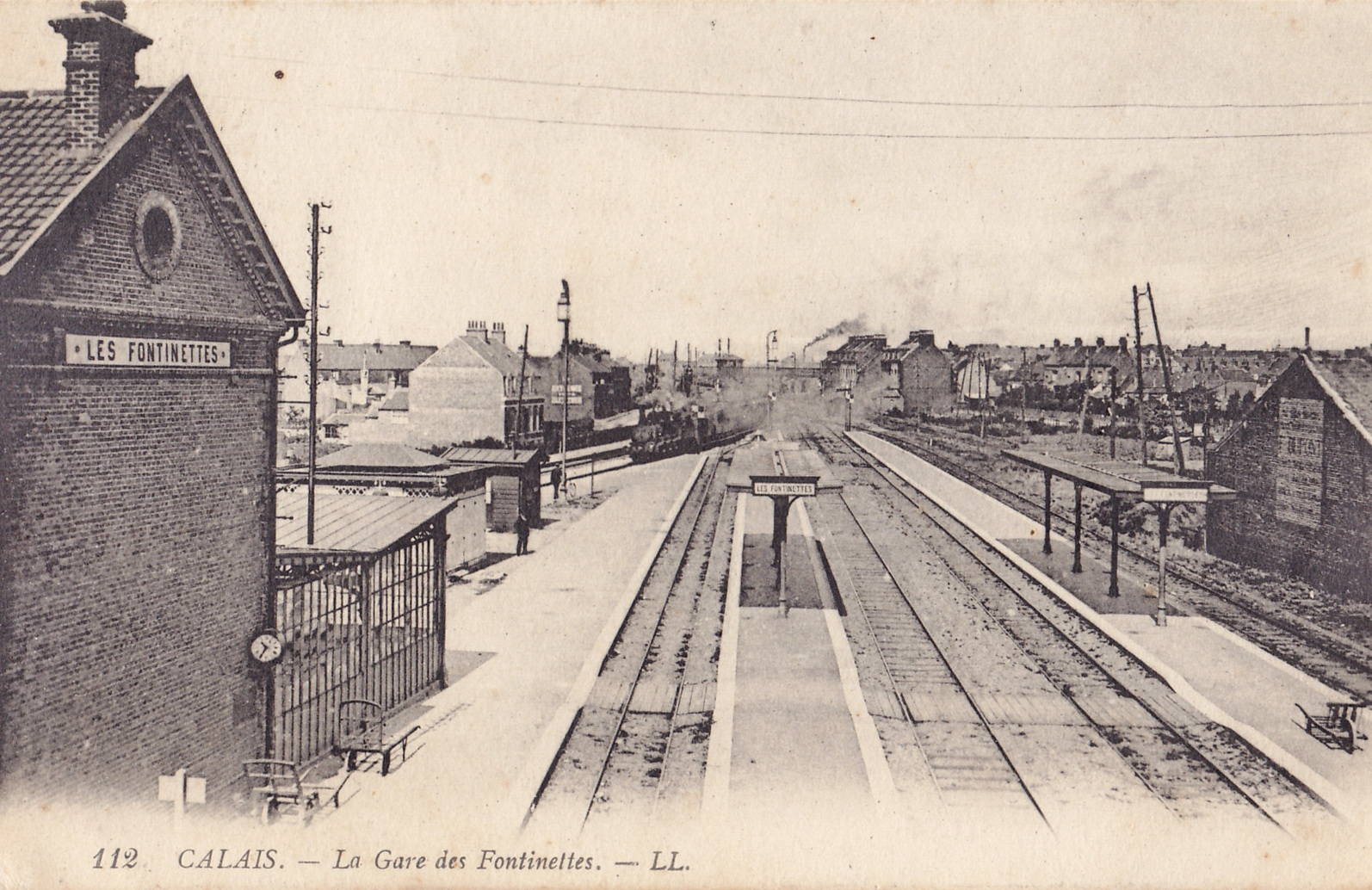
Calais-Fontinettes station, with a train entering.
- Anvin - Shared with Chemins de Fer du Nord station. 0 kilometres (0 mi) point. Elevation 60 metres (200 ft).
- Bergeneuse - 3 kilometres (1.86 mi) from Anvin. A type 2 station. Elevation 83 metres (272 ft).
- Équirre - 4.8 kilometres (2.98 mi) from Anvin. A halt. Elevation 106 metres (348 ft).
- Verchin - 9.3 kilometres (5.78 mi) from Anvin. A type 2 station. Elevation 105 metres (344 ft).
- Gourgesson - 12.6 kilometres (7.83 mi) from Anvin. An arrêt, which probably opened in 1893 with the opening of the CF du ARB. Elevation 95 metres (312 ft).
- Fruges - 15 kilometres (9.32 mi) from Anvin. A type 1 station. A workshops and depôt were located here, shared with the CF du ARB. A tannery was served via a siding. Elevation 96 metres (315 ft).
- Coupelle-Vielle - 17.1 kilometres (10.63 mi) from Anvin. A halt. Elevation 106 metres (348 ft).
- Rimeux-Gournay - 21.3 kilometres (13.24 mi) from Anvin. A type 2 station. Junction with CF du ARB. Elevation 162 metres (531 ft).
- Assonval - 23.4 kilometres (14.54 mi) from Anvin. An arrêt opened between 1892 and 1909. Elevation 137 metres (449 ft).
- Renty - 25.8 kilometres (16.03 mi) from Anvin. An arrêt opened between 1892 and 1909. Elevation 103 metres (338 ft).
- Fauquembergues - 28.6 kilometres (17.77 mi) from Anvin. A type 1 station. Elevation 76 metres (249 ft).
- Hervarre - 30.6 kilometres (19.01 mi) from Anvin. An arrêt opened between 1892 and 1909. Elevation 70 metres (230 ft).
- Merck-Saint-Liévin - 31.7 kilometres (19.70 mi) from Anvin. A halt. Elevation 66 metres (217 ft).
- Ouve - 34.6 kilometres (21.50 mi) from Anvin. A halt. Elevation 57 metres (187 ft).
- Wirquin - 36.6 kilometres (22.74 mi) from Anvin. An arrêt which was named Garage Avot until 1892. Messrs Avot's paper mill had a siding.
- Remilly-Wirquin - 37.9 kilometres (23.55 mi) from Anvin. A type 2 station, renamed Remilly in 1892. Elevation 53 metres (174 ft).
- Wavrans - 40.7 kilometres (25.29 mi) from Anvin. Originally a halt, downgraded to an arrêt by 1909. A siding served Messrs Avot's paper mill. Elevation 49 metres (161 ft).
- Elnes - 45 kilometres (27.96 mi) from Anvin. An arrêt opened between 1893 and 1909. A four rail dual gauge line ran from Lumbres to Messrs Avot's paper mill 520 metres (570 yd) towards Wavrans.
- Lumbres - 43.4 kilometres (26.97 mi) from Anvin. Shared with Chemin de fer du Nord station. Main workshops for the Anvin-Calais. Elevation 47 metres (154 ft).
- Acquin - 49.7 kilometres (30.88 mi) from Anvin. A type 2 station. Elevation 83 metres (272 ft).
- Bouvelinghem - 53.1 kilometres (32.99 mi) from Anvin. A halt. Elevation 132 metres (433 ft).
- Alquines-Buisson - 55.9 kilometres (34.73 mi) from Anvin. A halt which had opened by 1889 as Haut-Buisson. Upgraded to station status and renamed by 1909. Elevation 177 metres (581 ft).
- Journy - 58.1 kilometres (36.10 mi) from Anvin. A halt. Elevation 143 metres (469 ft).
- Bonningues - 63.2 kilometres (39.27 mi) from Anvin. A type 2 station. Junction with CF de BB. Elevation 68 metres (223 ft).
- Bonningues-Village - 65.2 kilometres (40.51 mi) from Anvin. An arrêt opened between 1892 and 1909. Elevation 42 metres (138 ft).
- Tournehen-sur-la-Hem - 67.5 kilometres (41.94 mi) from Anvin. A type 2 station. Elevation 40 metres (130 ft).
- Zouafques - 68.5 kilometres (42.56 mi) from Anvin. An arrêt opened between 1889 and 1892. Elevation 48 metres (157 ft).
- Louches - 72.8 kilometres (45.24 mi) from Anvin. A halt, with a siding serving a sucrerie. Elevation 17 metres (56 ft).
- Autingues - 74.9 kilometres (46.54 mi) from Anvin. An arrêt. Elevation 16 metres (52 ft).
- Ardres - 76.4 kilometres (47.47 mi) from Anvin. A type 1 station. Junction with TvAPA. Elevation 12 metres (39 ft).
- Brêmes - 77.6 kilometres (48.22 mi) from Anvin. An arrêt. Elevation 5 metres (16 ft).
- Balinghem - 79.5 kilometres (49.40 mi) from Anvin. A halt with a siding serving Messrs Say's sucrerie. Elevation 9 metres (30 ft).
- Andres - 81.6 kilometres (50.70 mi) from Anvin. A halt with a siding serving Messrs Says sucrerie. Elevation 13 metres (43 ft).
- Guînes - 84.1 kilometres (52.26 mi) from Anvin. A type 1 station.. Elevation 7 metres (23 ft).
- Banc-Valois - 86.6 kilometres (53.81 mi) from Anvin A halt, which had been downgraded to an arrêt by 1892. Renamed Banc Auguste Boulanger in 1945. Elevation 2 metres (7 ft).
- Écluse-Carée - 88.3 kilometres (54.87 mi) from Anvin. A halt. Elevation 2 metres (7 ft).
- Coulogne - 90.9 kilometres (56.48 mi) from Anvin. A halt. Elevation 3 metres (10 ft).
- Calais-Fontinettes - 92.9 kilometres (57.73 mi) from Anvin. Share with CF du Nord station. Elevation 3 metres (10 ft).
- Calais-St. Pierre - 94 kilometres (58.41 mi) from Anvin. A station, closed in 1900. Elevation 3 metres (10 ft).
- Calais-Ville - 95 kilometres (59.03 mi) from Anvin. Shared with CF du Nord Station from 1900. Elevation 5 metres (16 ft).

Other industries served by the line were a sandpit at Berthem, a quarry between Bonningues and Journy, a paper mill at Vedringhem and a sandpit at Zutkerque .

== Rolling stock ==
=== Locomotives ===
The following steam locomotives operated on the railway.

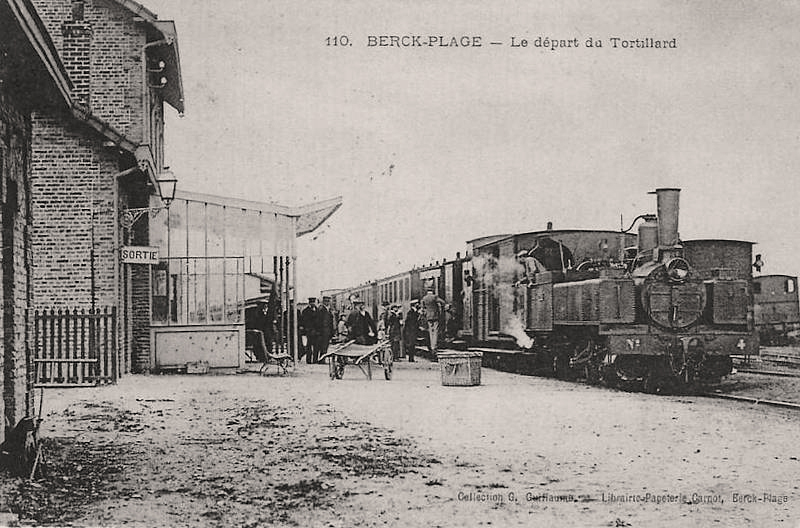
Locomotive No. 4, at Berck-Plage on the CF ARB.

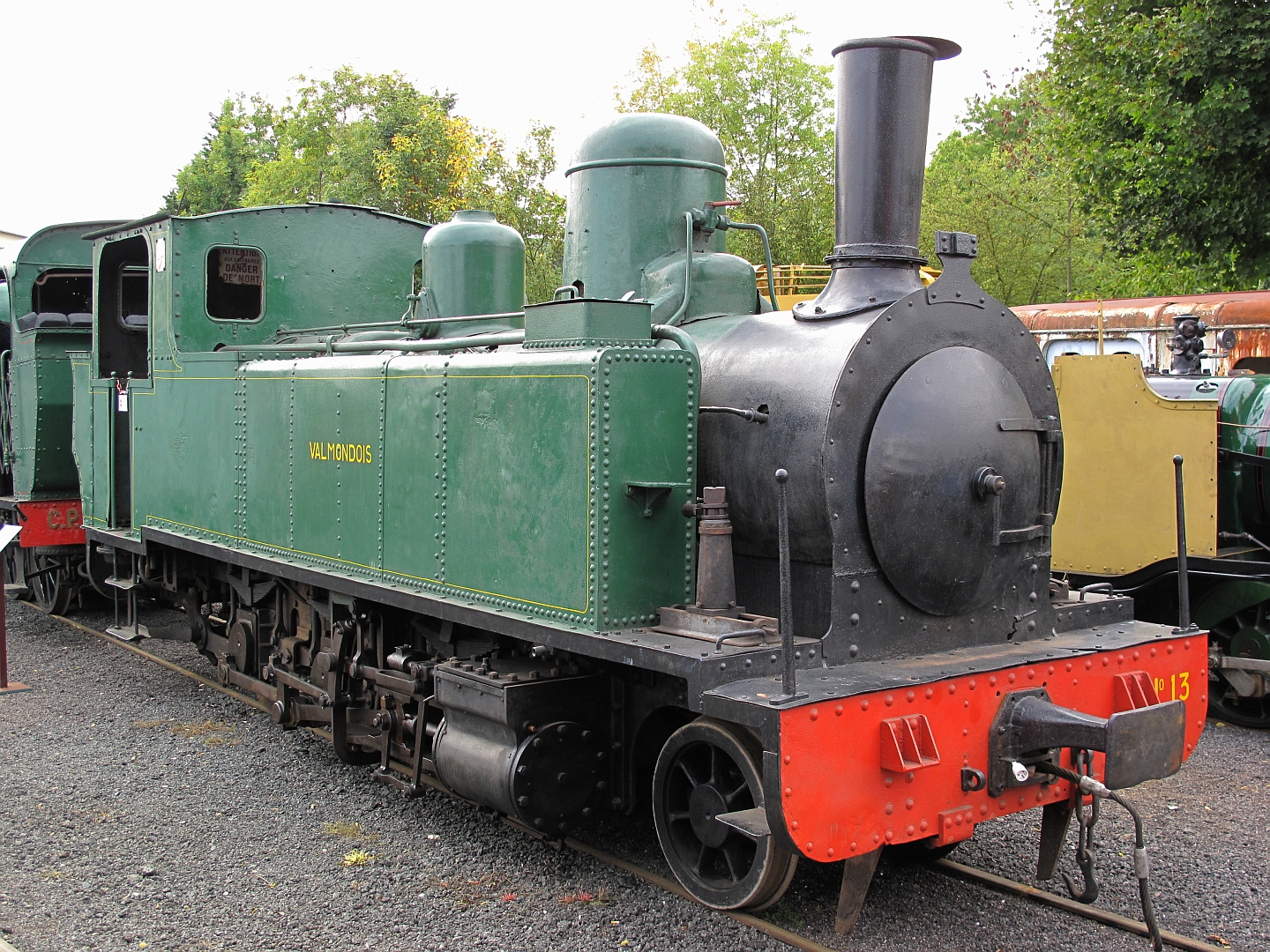
No. 13 as preserved at MTVS.

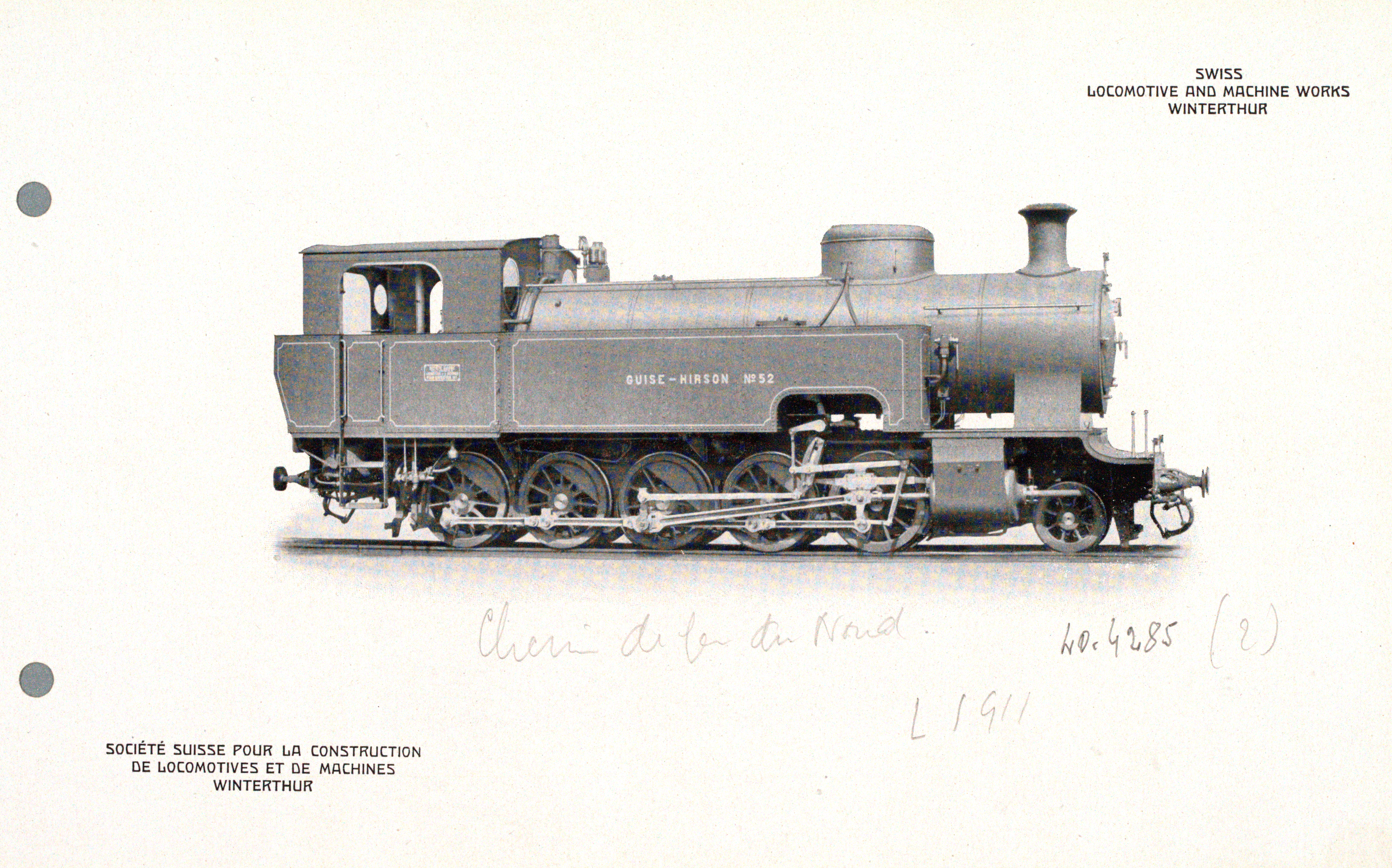
Locomotive No. 51, in CF Guise-Hirson livery.

| No. and name | Builder | Year | Wheel arrangement | Notes |
|---|---|---|---|---|
| 1 Fruges | SACM | 1880 | 0-6-2T | Entered service January 1882. Scrapped at Lumbres, 1956. |
| 2 Fauquembergues | SACM | 1880 | 0-6-2T | Entered service January 1882. |
| 3 Guînes | SACM | 1880 | 0-6-2T | Entered service August 1881. |
| 4 Calais | SACM | 1881 | 0-6-2T | Entered service August 1881. |
| 5 Ardres | SACM | 1881 | 0-6-2T | Entered service August 1881. Scrapped at Lumbres, 1956. |
| 6 Lumbres | SACM | 1881 | 0-6-2T | Entered service January 1882. Scrapped at Lumbres, 1956. |
| 7 Heuchin | SACM | 1882 | 0-6-2T | Entered service July 1882. Scrapped at Lumbres, 1956. |
| 8 Anvin | Batignolles | 1878 | 0-6-0T | Used during construction of line. To CF d'Allier in 1886. |
| 8 Saint Pierre | SACM | 1882 | 0-6-2T | Entered service May 1883. Scrapped at Lumbres, 1956. |
| 9 Tournehem | Pinguely | 1900 | 0-6-0T | Scrapped at Lumbres, 1956. |
| 10 Rimeux | SACM | 1924 | 0-6-0T | To CF ARB in 1900 |
| 13 | SACM | | 2-6-0T | Ex Sucrerie Trézennes and Ligne Berck-Plage à Paris-Plage No. 3. To CF de MF & NGL in 1947. Preserved at MTVS, Butry-sur-Oise. |
| 20 | ANB | 1906 | 2-6-0T | |
| 22 | ANB | 1909 | 2-6-0T | Ex CF Guise-Hirson No. 1. Entered service 1910, purchased in 1912. Scrapped at Lumbres, 1956. |
| 23 | ANB | 1909 | 2-6-0T | Ex CF Guise-Hirson No. 2. Entered service early 1920s. Scrapped at Lumbres, 1956. |
| 24 | ANB | 1909 | 2-6-0T | Ex CF Guise-Hirson No. 3. Entered service early 1920s. Scrapped at Lumbres, 1956. |
| 25 | ANB | 1909 | 2-6-0T | Ex CF Guise-Hirson No. 6. Entered service early 1920s. Scrapped at Lumbres, 1956. |
| 51 | SLM | 1911 | 2-10-0T | Ex CF Guise-Hirson. Entered service early 1920s. Scrapped at Lumbres, 1956. |
| 52 | SLM | 1911 | 2-10-0T | Ex CF Guise-Hirson. Entered service early 1920s. Scrapped at Lumbres, 1956. |
| 120 | ANB | 1924 | 2-6-0T | Scrapped at Lumbres, 1956. |
| 121 | ANB | 1924 | 2-6-0T | Scrapped at Lumbres, 1956. |
| 126 | ANB | 1924 | 2-6-0T | Scrapped at Lumbres, 1956. |
| 161 | Henschel | 1917 | 0-6-0+0-6-0T | Works No. 15161. Captured during World War I. Entered service c.1931. Scrapped 1940s. |

The following diesel locomotives operated on the railway.

| No. | Builder | Year | Wheel arrangement | Notes |
|---|---|---|---|---|
| 301 | VFIL, Lumbres | 1948 | 0-6-0 | To CF Ardennes 1955. Preserved at CFBS. |
| 650 | Ateliers CF Dordogne | 1946 | 0-6-0 | To CF Ardennes 1955 then Cimenterie d'Haubourdin 1961. Scrapped 1975. |
| 651 | Ateliers CF Dordogne | 1947 | 0-6-0 | To CF Ardennes 1955 then Cimenterie d'Haubourdin 1961. Scrapped 1975. |
| 652 | Ateliers CF Dordogne | 1947 | 0-6-0 | To CF Ardennes 1955 then Cimenterie d'Haubourdin 1961. Scrapped 1975. |

=== Railcars ===
The following railcars and trailers operated on the railway.

| No. | Builder | Type | Year | Notes |
|---|---|---|---|---|
| CGL 1 | VFIL, Lumbres | | 1930s | Rebuilt 1955. To CFBS 1957 as M 31. Preserved. |
| RS 1 | Renault-Scemia | | 1924 | Petrol engine. Rebuilt and shortened 1933/4 to become CGL11. |
| ARB 1 | VFIL, Lumbres | | 1932 | De Dion petrol engine. Scrapped post-1955 |
| RS 2 | Renault-Scemia | | 1925 | rebuilt 1934/5 as PdC 101 |
| ARB 3 | VFIL, Lumbres | | 1932 | Unic diesel engine. Scrapped post-1955. |
| ARB 4 | VFIL, Lumbres | | 1933/4 | Unic diesel engine. Scrapped post-1955. |
| ARB 5 | VFIL, Lumbres | | 1933/4 | Unic diesel engine. Scrapped post-1955. |
| CGL 6 | VFIL, Lumbres | | 1933/4 | Unic diesel engine. Scrapped post-1955. |
| CGL 7 | VFIL, Lumbres | | 1933/4 | Unic diesel engine. Scrapped post-1955. |
| CGL 11 | VFIL, Lumbres | | 1933/4 | Diesel engine |
| CGL 26 | Billard | A150D6 | 1947 | From Tramways Ille-et-Vilaine. To CFD du Tarn 1955. |
| CGL 27 | Billard | A150D6 | 1947 | From Tramways Ille-et-Vilaine. to CFD du Tarn 1955. |
| PdC 101 | VFIL, Lumbres | | 1934/5 | 85 horsepower (63 kW) Berliot diesel engine. |
| 608 | Billard | A80D1 | 1938 | From CF Dordogne in 1949/50. To CF Corrèze in 1955. |
| 610 | Billard | A80D1 | 1938 | From CF Dordogne in 1949/50. To CF Corrèze 1955. |
| 704 | Billard | A80D2 | 1939 | From CF de la Vendée in 1951. To VFIL Oise, 1955. |
| CGL Ra20 | Billard | R210 | 1938 | Trailer. From Tramways Ille-et-Vilaine. to CFD du Tarn 1955. |
| CGL Ra21 | Billard | R210 | 1938 | Trailer. From Tramways Ille-et-Vilaine. to CFD du Tarn 1955. |
| CGL Ra22 | Billard | R210 | 1938 | Trailer. From Tramways Ille-et-Vilaine. to CFD du Tarn 1955. |
| Ra 606 | Billard | A80D1 | | Trailer, former railcar with engine removed. From CF Dordogne in 1949/50. To CF Corrèze 1955. |

=== Passenger stock ===
An initial purchase of 32 four-wheel carriages and one bogie carriage was made for the commencement of services in 1881. The four-wheelers cost from ₣3,650 to ₣5,725 each and the bogie carriage cost ₣8,000. The four-wheelers consisted of 20 third class (24 seats) and 12 composite (5 first, second and third class, (19 seats) and 7 first and second class (22 seats)). The bogie coach seated 56. Three more bogie third carriages were purchased in 1886. By 1893, the railway had acquired at least one, and maybe three more bogie carriages. These seated 16 first class and 20 second class, plus baggage space which included a dog kennel. In 1912, four more bogie composite carriages were bought from Blanc-Misseron. Two were tri-composites, the others were second and third class only. Four flat wagons were capable of being converted to passenger carriages as required. Eight luggage vans were purchased for the opening of the line. Twelve bogie carriages and two luggage vans were bought from the CF Guise-Hirson in 1921.

=== Freight stock ===
By the time the line was completed in 1883, freight stock consisted of 30 ballast wagons, 40 open wagons, 42 flat wagons (of which 4 could be converted to passenger carriages) and 60 vans. Wagons cost from ₣1,123 to ₣2,350 each. In 1921, 22 vans and 40 open or flat wagons and a rail-mounted crane were bought from the CF Guise-Hirson. A further 29 wagons would be purchased at a later date.
