= Virgin Cinemas =

British cinema chain, 1995–2002

- Type: Private
- Industry: Movie theater
- Predecessor: MGM Cinemas
- Founded: 1995; 31 years ago United Kingdom
- Founder: Richard Branson
- Defunct: 2002; 24 years ago
- Fate: Sold to UGC
- Successor: UGC; Toho Cinemas
- Parent: Virgin Group

Virgin Cinemas was founded in 1995 when Richard Branson's Virgin Group acquired MGM Cinemas, the largest cinema operator in the United Kingdom. Virgin Group bought the cinemas for £195m, and subsequently sold 90 of the chain's smallest cinemas to Cinven and ABC for £70m to concentrate on multiplexes.

In late 1999, Virgin announced that it would sell its cinema interests in the UK and Ireland to UGC, in which French entertainment and utilities giant Vivendi has a 38% controlling share. Virgin sold the chain for £215m, making them a profit of £90m, and all the cinemas were to be rebranded to UGC. The company did strike a long-term deal, however, for UGC to continue to sell Virgin Cola.

The group continued to operate a Virgin Cinemas Japan unit, and announced, also in late 1999, that it would spend up to US$200 million to develop 20 multiplexes in Japan by the early 21st century; a number of Virgin multiplexes in the United States were also under consideration. Despite this, the company closed down in late 2002 as it was sold to Toho, forming Toho Cinemas.
