= Toho Cinemas =

Japanese cinema chain

Toho Cinemas Ltd.

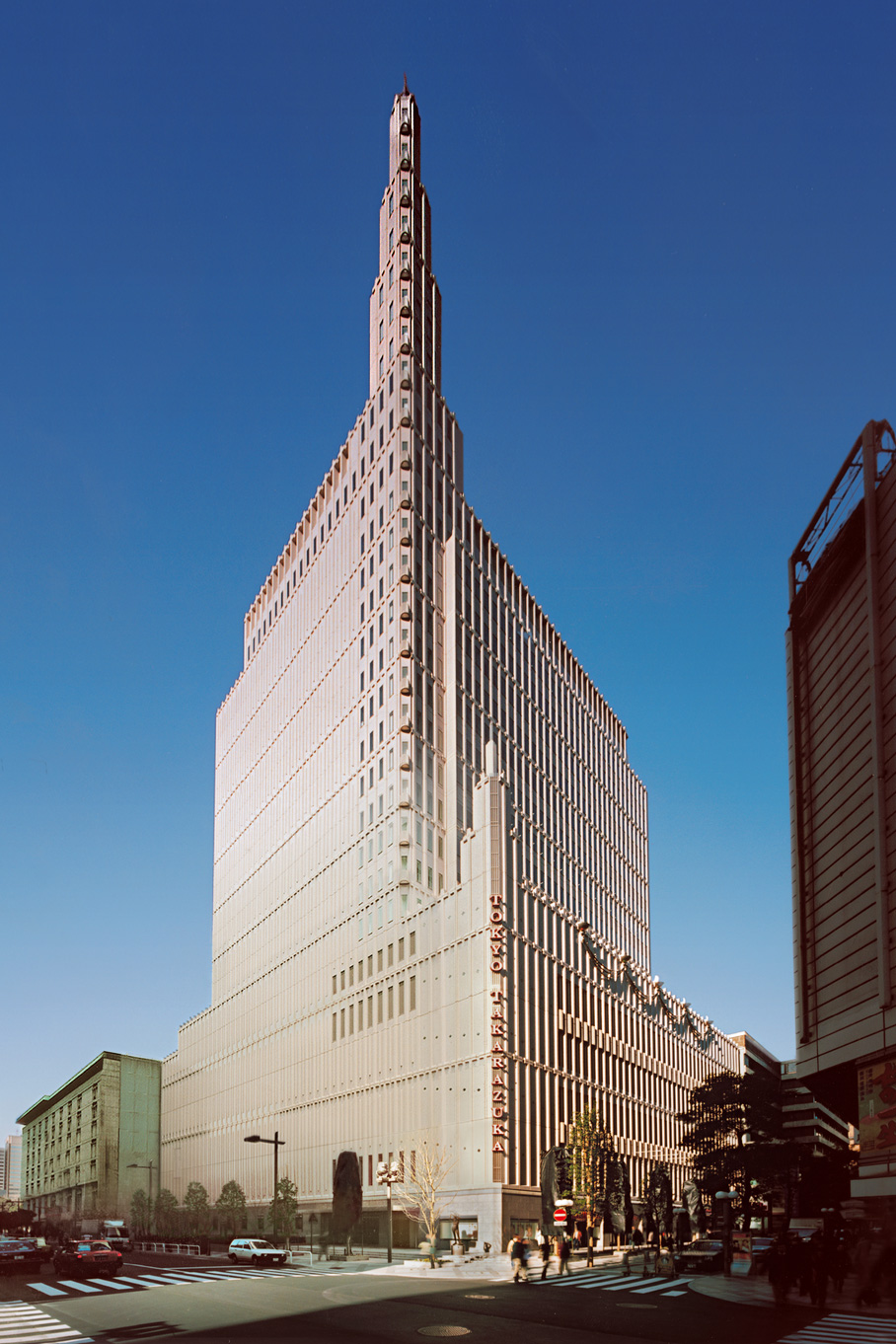
- Headquarters in Chiyoda, Tokyo
- Formerly: Virgin Cinemas Japan Ltd. (1997-2003)
- Type: Subsidiary
- Predecessor: Toho (movie theater division)
- Founded: 1997; 29 years ago
- Founder: Mark Yamamoto; Virgin Group
- Headquarters: Yurakucho, Chiyoda, Tokyo, Japan
- Key people: Kazuhiko Seta (president and representative director)
- Number of employees: 5,900 (September 2019)
- Parent: Toho Co., Ltd.
- Website: www.tohocinemas.co.jp

Toho Cinemas Ltd. (TOHOシネマズ, Tōhō Shinemazu) is a Japanese movie theater company. A wholly owned subsidiary of Toho Co., Ltd, it is the second-largest cinema chain in Japan by number of screens (after Aeon Cinemas). It was founded in 1997 as Virgin Cinemas Japan Ltd. and was acquired by Toho in 2003.

== Overview ==
Virgin Cinemas Japan Ltd. was founded by Japanese-American businessman Mark Yamamoto on September 12, 1997. Virgin Cinemas Trias Hisayama, their first theatre, opened in Fukuoka Prefecture on April 23, 1999. By the end of 2002, it expanded from 8 theatres to 81 and became Japan's sixth largest film entertainment company.

On April 4, 2003, Toho purchased Virgin Cinemas for 10.3 billion yen, renaming the company Toho Cinemas. Since then, Toho and other companies have developed cinema complexes under the new brand. In addition, many cinemas that the Toho Group had previously operated were renamed after the renewal. Toho Cinemas also integrated the ticketing system and point cards.

On October 1, 2006, Toho Cinemas succeeded Toho's cinema division as the parent company, due to the restructuring of the company's filmed entertainment division, to improve management efficiency as a wholly owned subsidiary of the company's film entertainment business. As a next step, Toho East Japan Kogyo Co., Ltd., Chubu Toho, Toho Kansai Koki Co., and Kyushu Toho merged into Toho Cinemas, Ltd. on March 1, 2008.

In 2007, the chain debuted a series of policy trailers featuring characters from the hit anime series Secret Society Eagle Talon.

After reorganizing, the chain began to operate several conventional pavilions and other cinemas under the name Cinema Media. In July 2013, Toho Cinemas had the second most movie theaters in Japan, after Ion Entertainment.

In May 2015, Toho started Dreampass, an online service that sells tickets for frequently requested movies.
