= Aniche =

- Commune
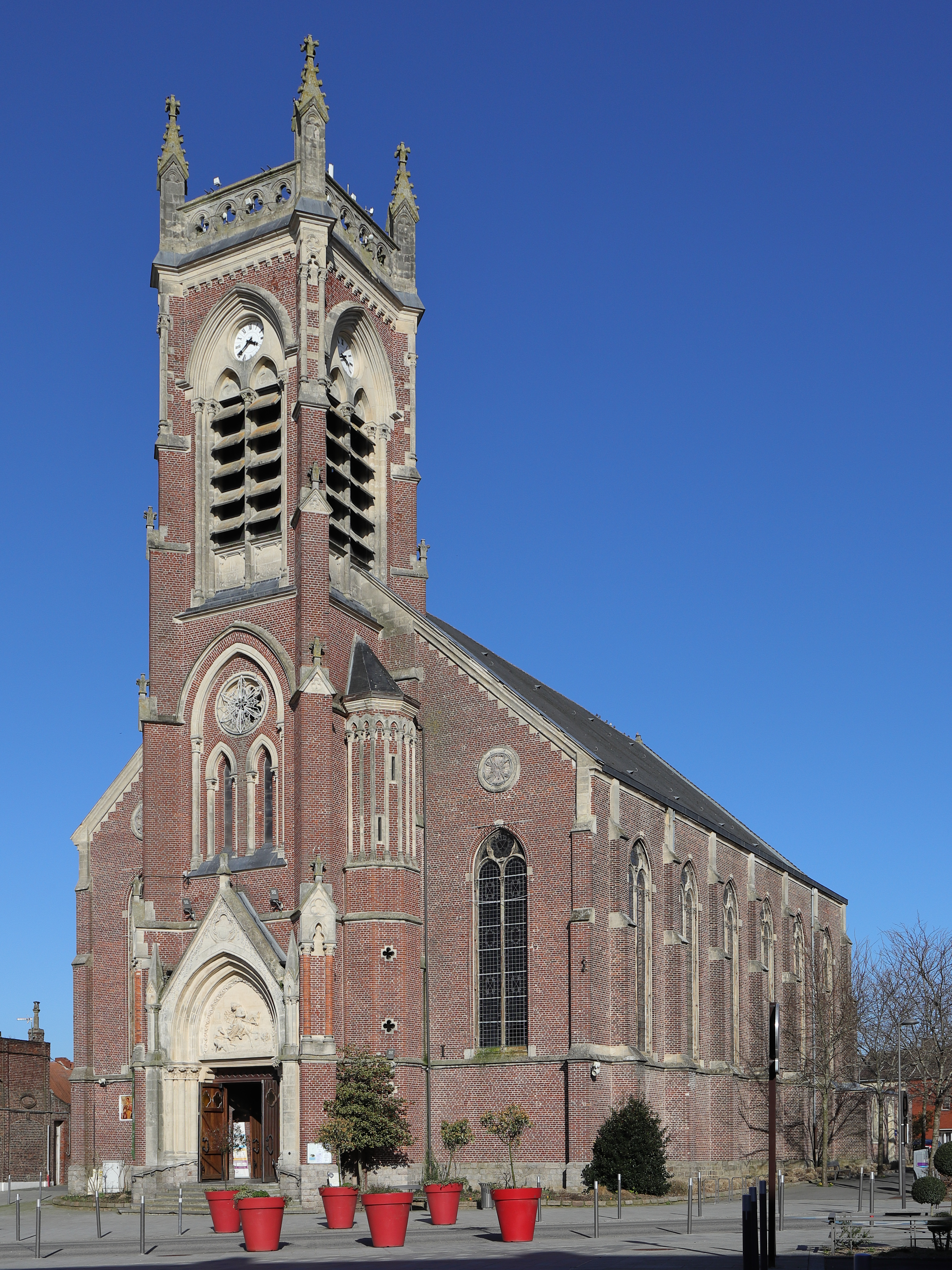
- The Church of Saint-Martin

- Coat of arms
- Location of Aniche
- Location within France Location within Hauts-de-France
- Coordinates: 50°19′50″N 3°15′07″E
- Country: France
- Region: Hauts-de-France
- Department: Nord
- Arrondissement: Douai
- Canton: Aniche
- Intercommunality: CC Cœur d'Ostrevent

Government
  - Mayor (2020–2026): Xavier Bartoszek
- Area^{1}: 6.52 km^{2} (2.52 sq mi)
- Elevation: 65 m (213 ft)
- Highest elevation: 71 m (233 ft)
- Lowest elevation: 26 m (85 ft)
- Population (2023): 9,963
  - Density: 1,530/km^{2} (3,960/sq mi)
- Time zone: UTC+01:00 (CET)
  - Summer (DST): UTC+02:00 (CEST)
- INSEE/Postal code: 59008 /59580
- ^{1} French Land Register data, which excludes lakes, ponds, glaciers > 1 km^{2} (0.386 sq mi or 247 acres) and river estuaries.

Aniche (French pronunciation: [aniʃ]; Picard: In-niche) is a commune in the Nord département in the Hauts-de-France region of northern France.

The commune, located in the Nord-Pas-de-Calais mining area, long lived on the mining of coal with fourteen pits on its territory. Eleven pits were owned by the Aniche Mining Company and three by the Compagnie des mines d'Azincourt (Agincourt Mining Company).

== History ==
=== Middle Ages ===
- In the early 12th century, Marchiennes Abbey owned the altar and tithes which had previously been owned by Anselm le Barbu, Count of Ostrevant, and his successors
- On 27 April 1181, Philippe, Count of Flanders and Vermandois, was at the Saint-Martin of Aniche basilica in the presence of the relics of the Virgin Eusebia. He regulated the rights of the Abbey on tithing.
- In 1209, Bauduin of Obrechicourt, knight, waived his rights for tithes from Aniche.
- In 1219, Robert, sire of Aniche, made an award in favour of the Abbey for land that he contested with Jean le Mirail d'Aniche.
- In 1340, during the Hundred Years War, the people of Douai, France's allies, burned the village which was considered pro-British.

Aniche and Auberchicourt long had the same lords.

=== Cartulary of Duke Charles de Croy ===
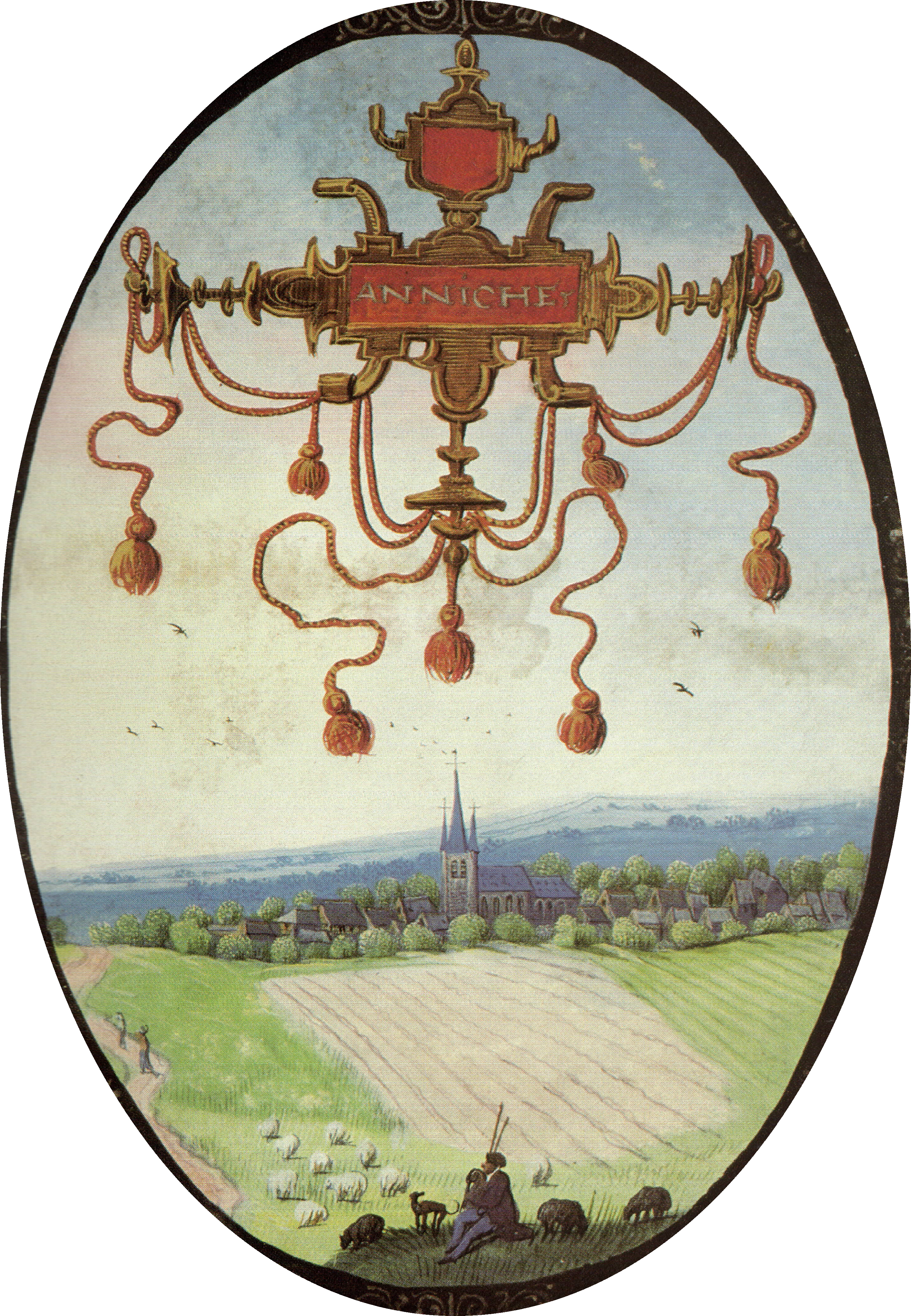
The Cartulary

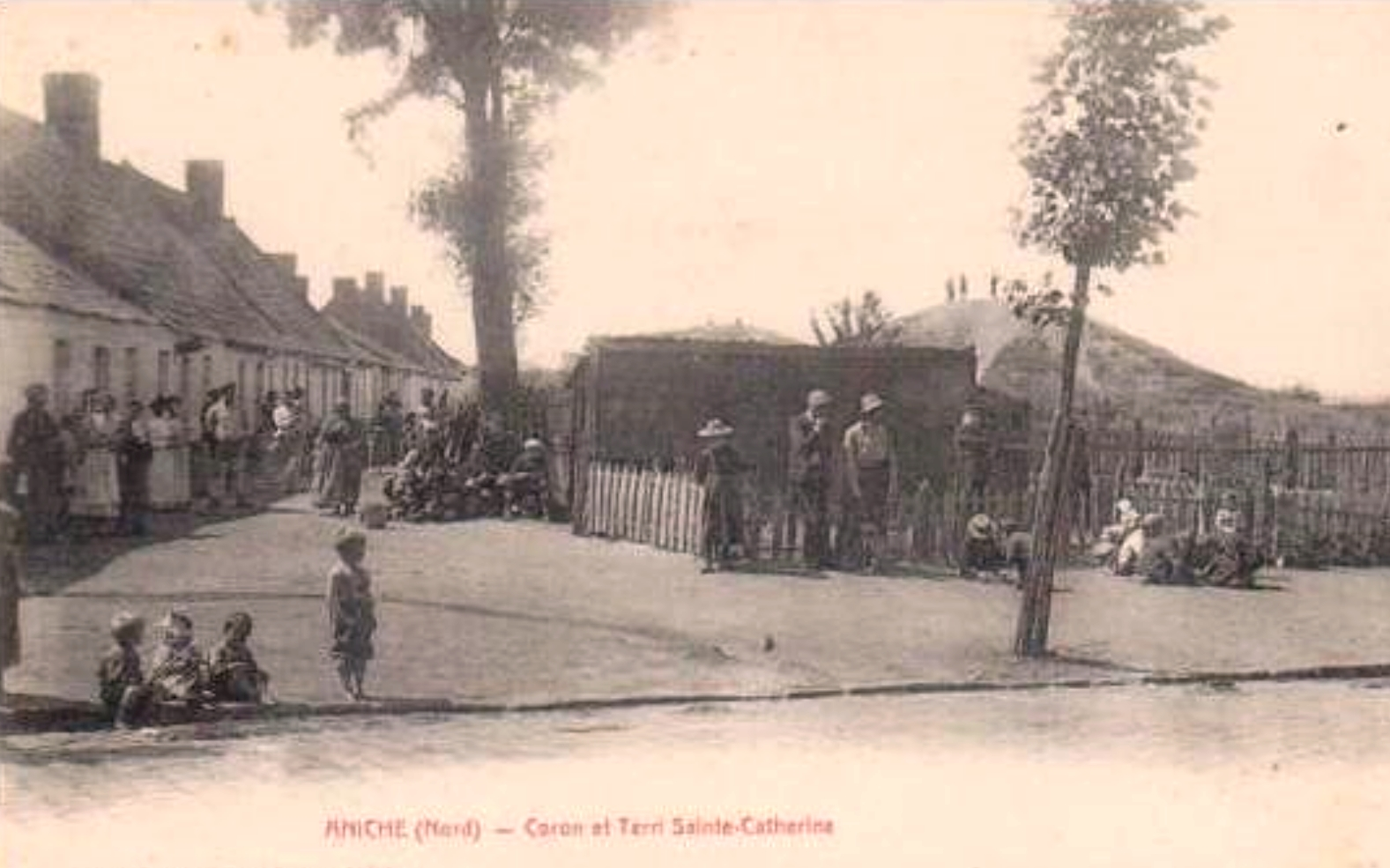
Aniche and the slag heap of Sainte-Catherine at the beginning of the 20th century

The Gouache painting (opposite) was probably painted in 1603 and appears in the Albums de Croÿ. It is part of a wide range of topographical paintings made at the request of the Duke of Croy: an oval with a bird's-eye view of the landscape is framed in the four corners by four naked male figures with those at the top facing and the lower ones facing to the rear. The oval medallion contains a cartouche with the name of the village over a representation of the landscape seen from the south in late summer (see the plowed field and leaves on the trees).

In the foreground

- A road on the left with two figures. This road would be the way from Bouchain to Auberchicourt and Douai.
- In the centre bottom a shepherd on a hill with four sheep with a further ten sheep between the path and the plowed field.

In the background

- The village houses grouped around the church on the edge of the plowed field. Note that the artist has featured hooks on the church roof which trapped snow and also allowed the hanging of ladders for maintenance of the slates. Two turrets are visible on the side of the church with spires covered with slate.
- Seven buildings to the left of the church, eleven to the right all with 2 sided roofs.
- The church dominates the centre of the medallion with the bell tower on the left with a spire and four Fléchons covered with slate, angled and louvred, the choir on the right with four high bays whose roof is lower than the nave. The nave seems be made of four bays without an aisle. The choir appears to be of Roman style, narrower and lower and unusually elongated (with three spans). This church differs from the present church which was rebuilt from 1857 to 1859 and the tower rebuilt in 1872.
- Another impressive building is located on the right.

In the far background

- A dominant hill on the right.

=== From the 16th century to the Revolution ===
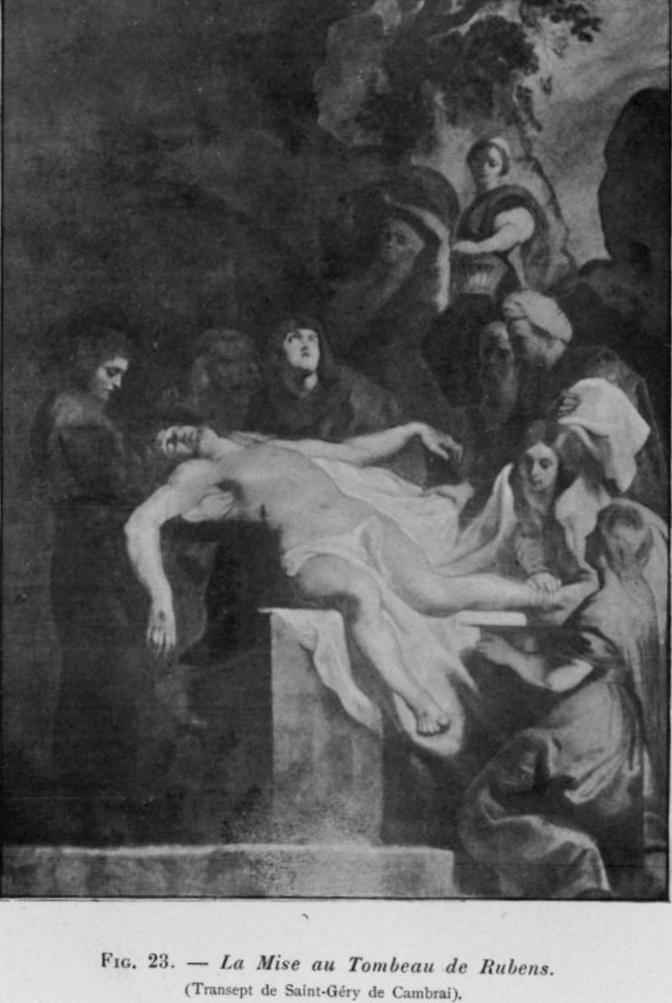
Peter Paul Rubens The Entombment in the Church of Saint-Géry of Cambrai.

- In 1616, Peter Paul Rubens came to Cambrai from his Rubenshuis in Antwerp and, in passing Lille, stopped at Aniche and left three paintings including The Entombment and two smaller ones: a Saint Francis and a Saint Clare. For The Entombment (also called the Descent from the Cross), Rubens painted the Christ naked. According to Eugéne-Bouly de Lesdain it is no longer intact: "A foreign hand cast a veil of decency on the painting which he felt obliged to impose". An alien hand that may be attributed to Anonymous of Antwerp.

The Entombment by Rubens is always visible in the Church of Saint-Gery of Cambrai.

- Under Charles V Aniche became a possession of the King of Spain until the Treaty of Nijmegen in 1678 when the Chatellenie of Bouchain returned to Louis XIV, King of France.
- In 1686, Eugène de Sainte-Adelgonde, Baron of Bours and Rieulay held the right of high justice in the land of Aniche under letters patent of engagement (lettres-patentes d'engagière).
- In 1778, on the night of 11 to 12 September, the discovery of coal in the Sainte Catherine pit caused the expansion and transformation of village society. The Marquis de Traisnel Company and Claude-Constant Juvénal d'Harville des Ursins, then the owner of the manor, became the Aniche Mining Company - the second largest coal company in France after the Anzin Mining Company.

=== 18th century ===
On the morning of 7 February 1827 at the Saint Hyacinthe pit, fire broke out in an access passage for the workers to descend into the pit. Thick smoke spread inside the mine and asphyxiated 46 workers employed in the coal extraction tunnels. Seven young men and two fathers were found dead.

- 50°20′4.71″N 3°14′43.47″E Location of the Saint Hyacinthe pit

=== From the 19th century to the present day ===
After the creation of the first glassworks in 1823, Aniche became, from the middle of the 19th century, the French capital of the window glass industry and went from 4,000 to 7,500 inhabitants in 1900. The Antoine Lumière & son plates and photographic papers Company (Lyon) were supplied by the Glassworks of the Station, better known under the name "Belotte Glass".

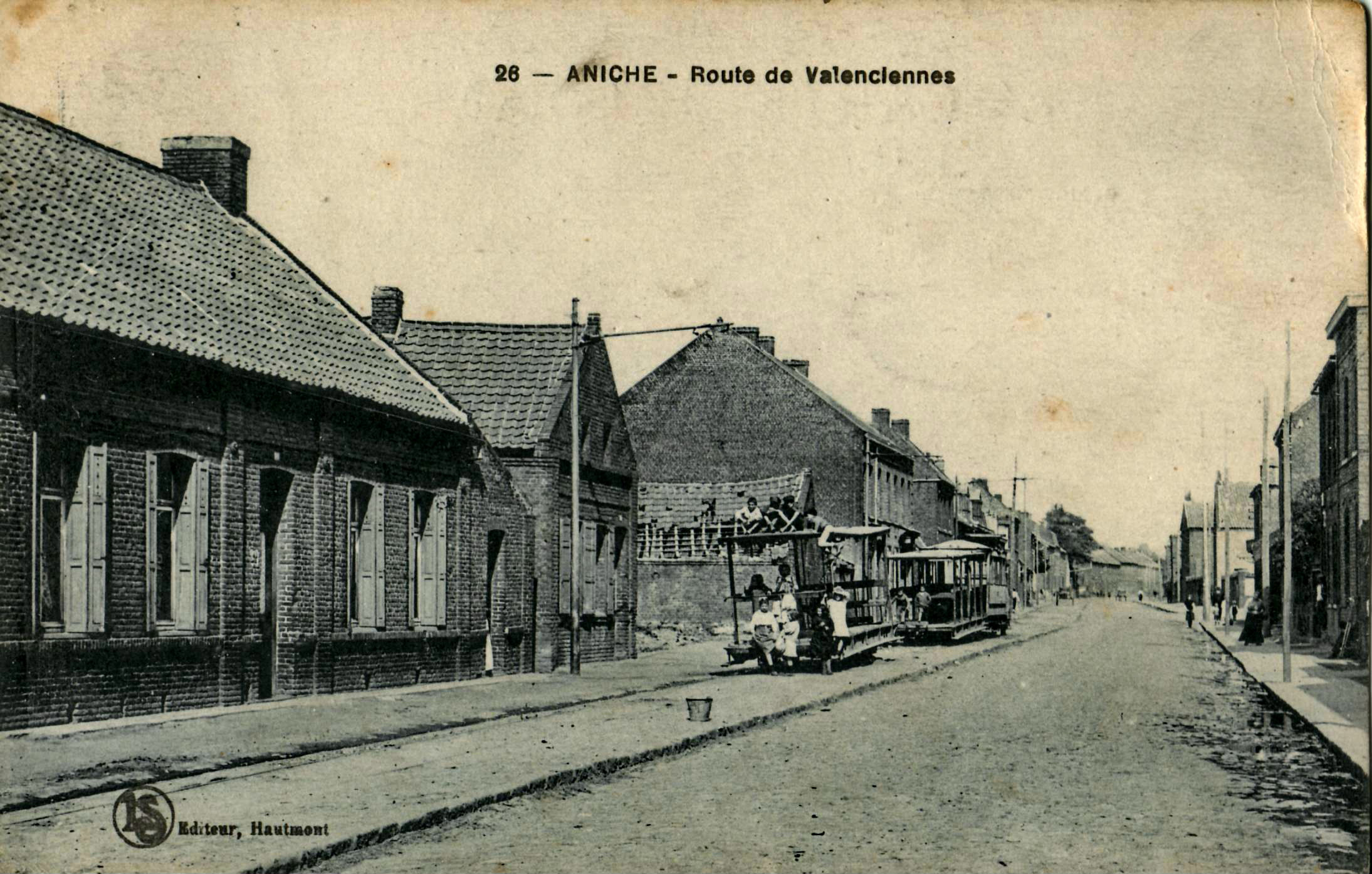
Aniche was served by the former Tramway of Douai, seen here on the Route de Valenciennes in the late 1910s

On 28 November 1900, 21 workers were killed by the explosion of 148 kg of dynamite in the Fenelon pit owned by the Aniche Mining Company.

The First World War caused a sharp slowdown in industrial activity and led to the destruction by the occupying power of the majority of installations before their departure in October 1918.

The occupation lasted 49 months from September 1914 to 20 October 1918 when the village was liberated by British forces. There were 314 war victims from Aniche: 299 at the front or from injuries and 15 civilian victims.

The period between the wars saw the decline of the mining industry with the cessation of operations of the last pit in 1938 and the final closure of the glassworks at the beginning of the Second World War.

=== Heraldry ===
Arms of Aniche	The arms of Aniche are blazoned : Ermine, on a cross gules, 5 roses Or. (Aniche, Bugnicourt, and Rieulay use the same arms.)

== Geography ==
Aniche is located some 15 km south-east of Douai and some 7 km north-west of Douchy-les-Mines in the heart of the old Ostrevent region. Access is by the D943 road from Bouchain in the south-east passing through the commune to the town. There is also the D645 from Auberchicourt in the west passing through the town and continuing east to Abscon. The D47 road comes from Bruille-lez-Marchiennes in the north passing through the town and continuing south-west to Monchecourt. More than half of the commune consists of the urban area of Aniche town with the rest of the commune in the east and south farmland.

=== Geology and terrain ===
On 27 December 1893, an earthquake occurred in the glass-making district which indicated a seismic risk that the coal mines then more or less took into account.

=== Communications and transport ===
Aniche is connected to Douai by bus route 1 (Aniche-Guesnain) which connects with Tram A (Guesnain-Douai) of the SMTC of Douai, as well as routes 211 (Guesnain-Denain via Aniche), 210 (Aniche-Somain), and 201 (Aniche-Villeneuve d'Ascq) operated by the Arc-en-Ciel network.

Phase 3 of Route A will link Aniche on the Évéole network of autobuses to Douai. The line will link the Champ de la Nation in the centre of town and pass along the Rue Henri-Barbusse.

The commune was served by rail transport through Aniche station which was demolished in 2010.

=== Neighbouring communes and villages ===
Source:

== Toponymy ==
The name of Aniche (Anic) was mentioned for the first time in 1103 in a list of the possessions of the abbey of Marchiennes, then as Enice in 1113 and Henice in 1181. It was in 1219 that the name Aniche appears under the seal of Robert, Lord of Aniche and of Auberchicourt.

In Flemish, the commune is called Anik.

== Administration ==
List of Successive Mayors

Mayors from 1615 to 1942

From	To	Name	Party	Position
1615		Nicolas Dufour		
1630		Jean-Crépin Vallet		
1661		Nicolas Dufour		
1705		Jean Guilmo		
1706		Jean Vallet		
1716		Jean-Robert Cannesson		
1729		Jean-Jacques Danchin		
1731		Gille Marouzet		
1736		François Caron		
1737		Maurand Guilmo		
1744		Alexis Lanseau		
1756		Anselme Lefebvre		
1790	1791	Nicolas François Joseph Quennesson		
1791	1792	Philippe Antoine Clery		
1791		Jean-Louis Quennesson		
1792	1795	Nicolas François Guillemot		
1795	1800	Nicolas Joseph Guillemot		
1799		Toussaint Caron		
1800	1817	Auguste Louis Lanvin		Lieutenant
1812		Ambroise Olivier		
1818	1824	Louis Joseph Stanislas Hayez		
1824	1831	Jacques Joseph Dubois		
1831	1854	Edouard Auguste Lanvin		
1848	1875	Adolphe Achille Aristide Patoux		
1875	1876	Charles Ducret		
1878	1881	Alexandre Fogt		
1881	1884	Charles Ducret		
1884	1886	Jean Louis Dewez		
1886	1889	Edouard Alexandre Joseph Lefebvre		
1889	1900	Victor Adolphe Bastin		
1900	1902	Charles Adolphe Scelles		
1902	1910	Pierre Joseph Richard Bertinchamps		
1910	1919	Eloi Joseph Lanoi		
1919	1925	Pierre Olivier Humez		
1925	1929	Emile Germain Léon Danchin		
1929	1931	Louis Pol		
1931	1932	Philippe Descamps		
1932	1933	Louis Pol		
1933	1939	Jules Agile Domisse	PCF	
1939	1942	Albert Betrema		

Mayors from 1930

From	To	Name	Party
1942	1944	Gaston Lefort	
1944	1959	Jean Schmidt	
1959	1971	François Longelin	
1971	1989	Jean Charles François Quiquempois	
1989	2014	Michel Meurdesoif	PCF
2014	2020	Marc Hémez	
2020	2026	Xavier Bartoszek	

== Twin towns – sister cities ==
Aniche is twinned with:

- Bobingen, Germany (1969)
- Nový Bor, Czech Republic (1990)

== Demography ==
The inhabitants of the commune are known as Anichois or Anichoises in French. According to historians, in 1540 Aniche had 47 fires of which 7 were of ploughmen (the others had no horse & carts or other animals).

Historical population

Year	Pop.	±% p.a.
1793	840	—
1800	804	−0.62%
1806	1,064	+4.78%
1821	1,733	+3.31%
1831	1,926	+1.06%
1836	1,807	−1.27%
1841	2,030	+2.35%
1846	2,537	+4.56%
1851	3,057	+3.80%
1856	3,826	+4.59%
1861	4,156	+1.67%
1866	4,501	+1.61%
1872	4,922	+1.50%
1876	5,484	+2.74%
1881	5,861	+1.34%
1886	6,253	+1.30%
1891	6,765	+1.59%
1896	6,924	+0.47%
1901	7,434	+1.43%

Year	Pop.	±% p.a.
1906	8,321	+2.28%
1911	8,603	+0.67%
1921	8,808	+0.24%
1926	9,348	+1.20%
1931	9,105	−0.53%
1936	9,037	−0.15%
1946	8,836	−0.22%
1954	9,421	+0.80%
1962	10,419	+1.27%
1968	10,190	−0.37%
1975	9,690	−0.72%
1982	9,533	−0.23%
1990	9,672	+0.18%
1999	9,768	+0.11%
2007	10,023	+0.32%
2012	10,558	+1.05%
2017	10,244	−0.60%
2023	9,963	−0.46%

Source: EHESS and INSEE

=== Distribution of age groups ===
Percentage Distribution of Age Groups in Aniche and Nord Department in 2023

Population by age of Aniche, 2023 (%)

80+	3.7
65–79	11.9
55–64	10.8
40–54	18.2
25–39	18.8
15–24	14.4
0–14	22.1

Total: 99.9

male

female

Source: INSEE

Population by age of Nord, 2023 (%)

90+	4.8
75–89	13.3
60–74	11.8
45–59	19
30–44	18.7
15–29	13.9
0–14	18.4

Total: 99.9

male

female

Source: INSEE

== Culture and heritage ==
=== Sites and monuments ===
- L'Idéal Cinéma Jacques Tati. Its first show was on 23 November 1905. Demolished and rebuilt in 1995.
- The Théodore Monod College is the largest college of the Academy of Lille
- The Church of Saint Martin built in 1855-1859 by the architect Charles Leroy
- The War Memorial 1914-1918 located in the Berrioz Square and opened on 9 November 1924 (314 victims from Aniche).
- The College of Saint Joseph, a former hospital during the war.
- Saint Joseph School
- The pyramid
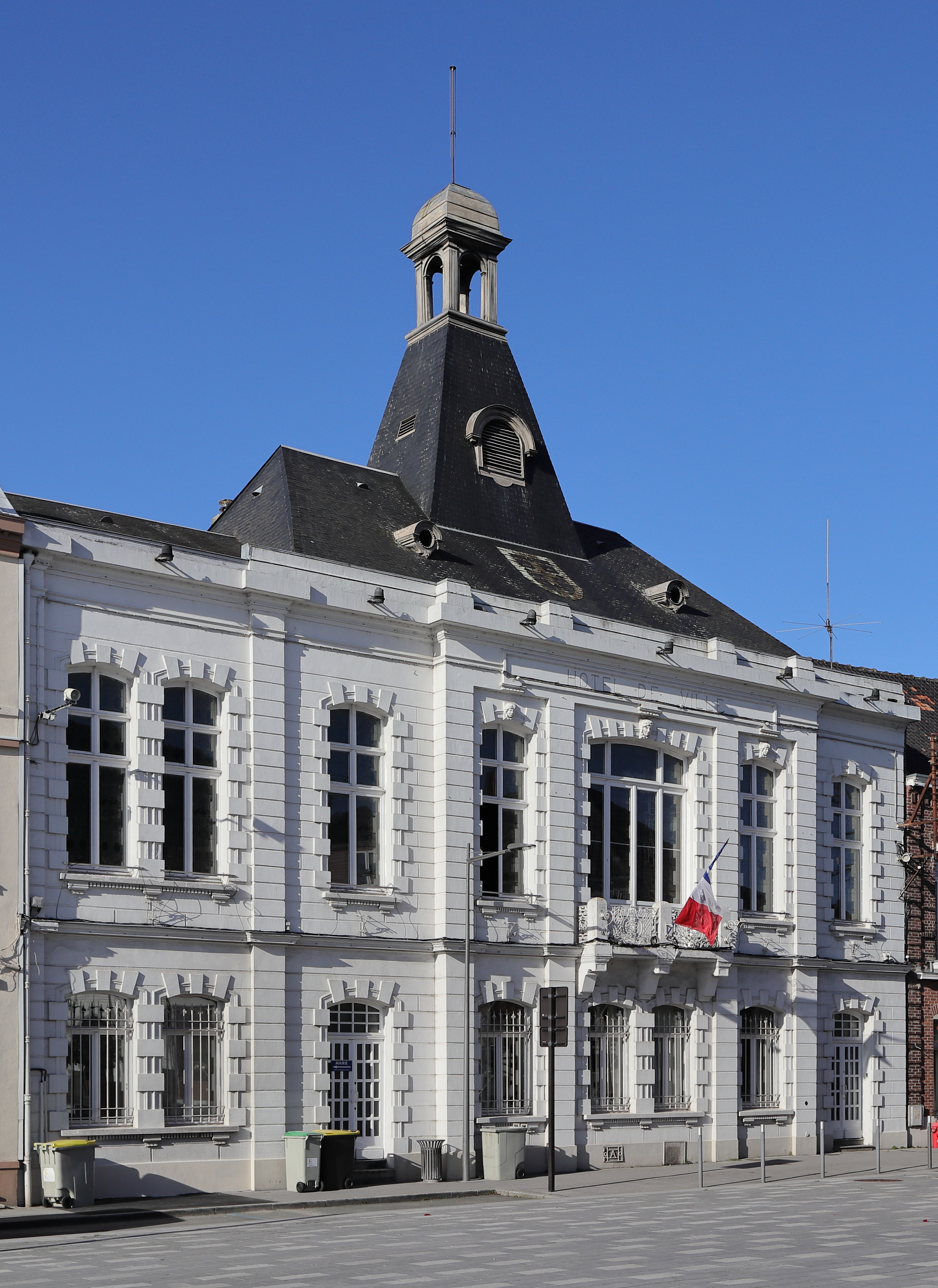
The town hall

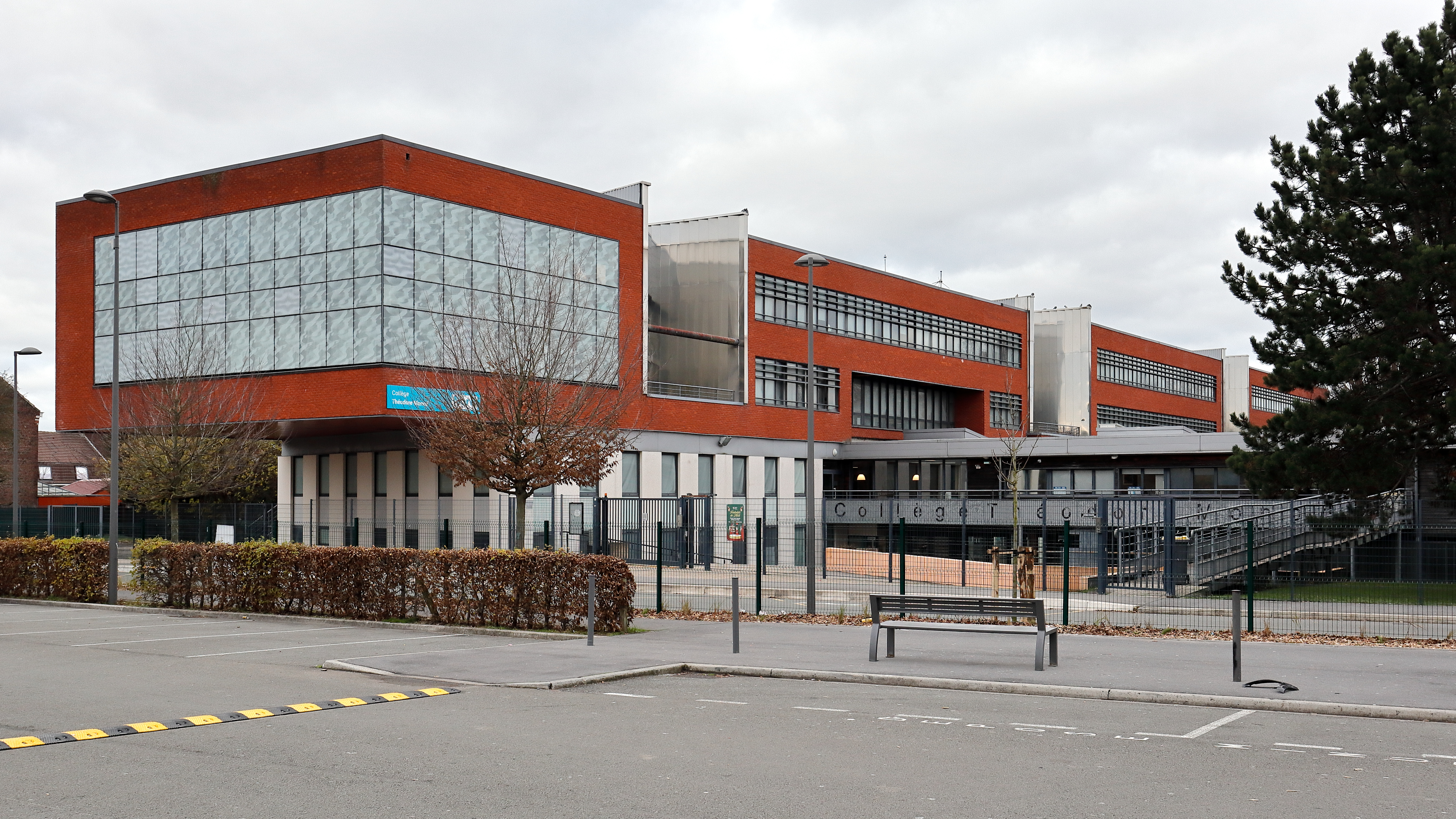
Théodore Monod Secondary School

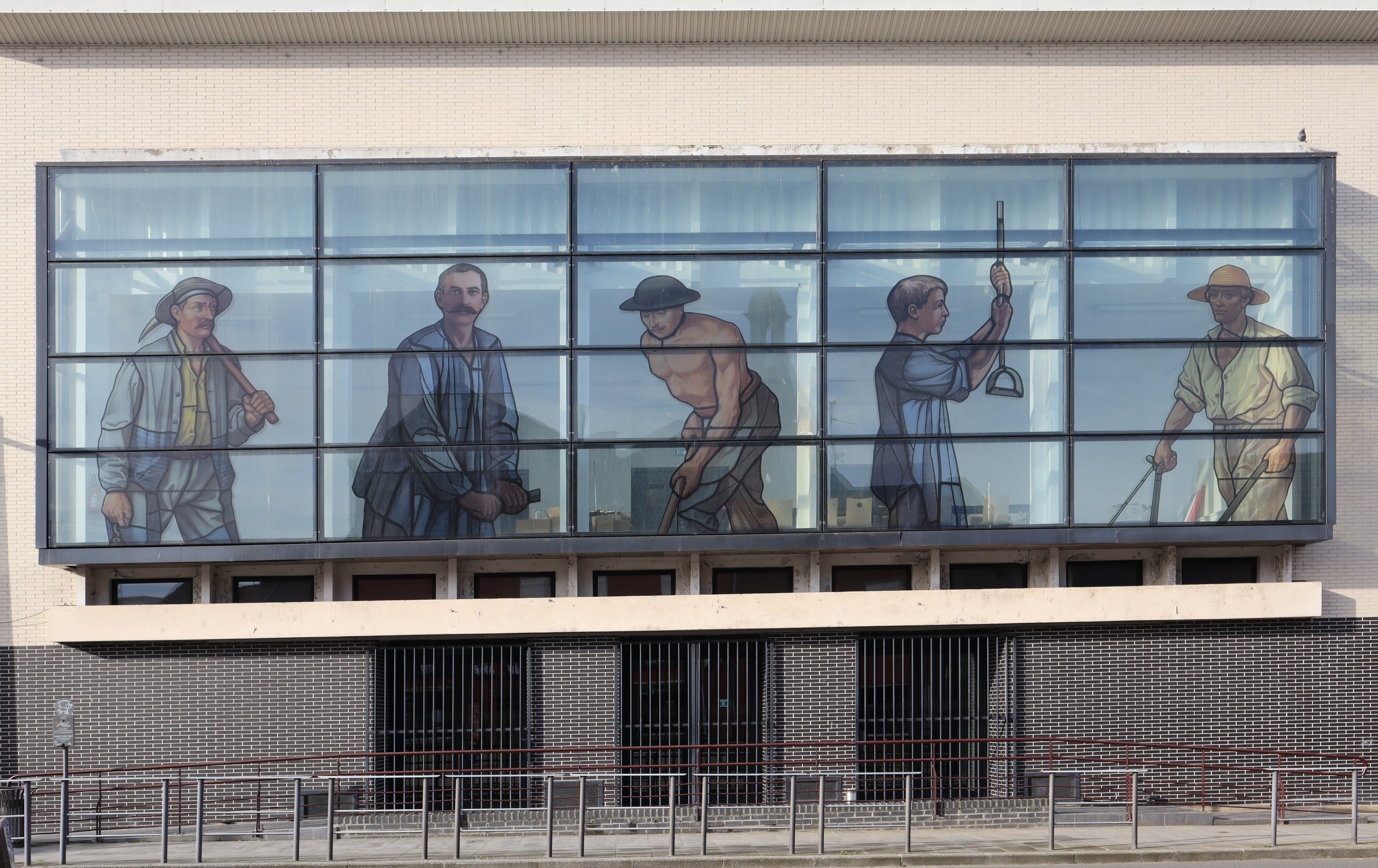
Claudine Normand Room

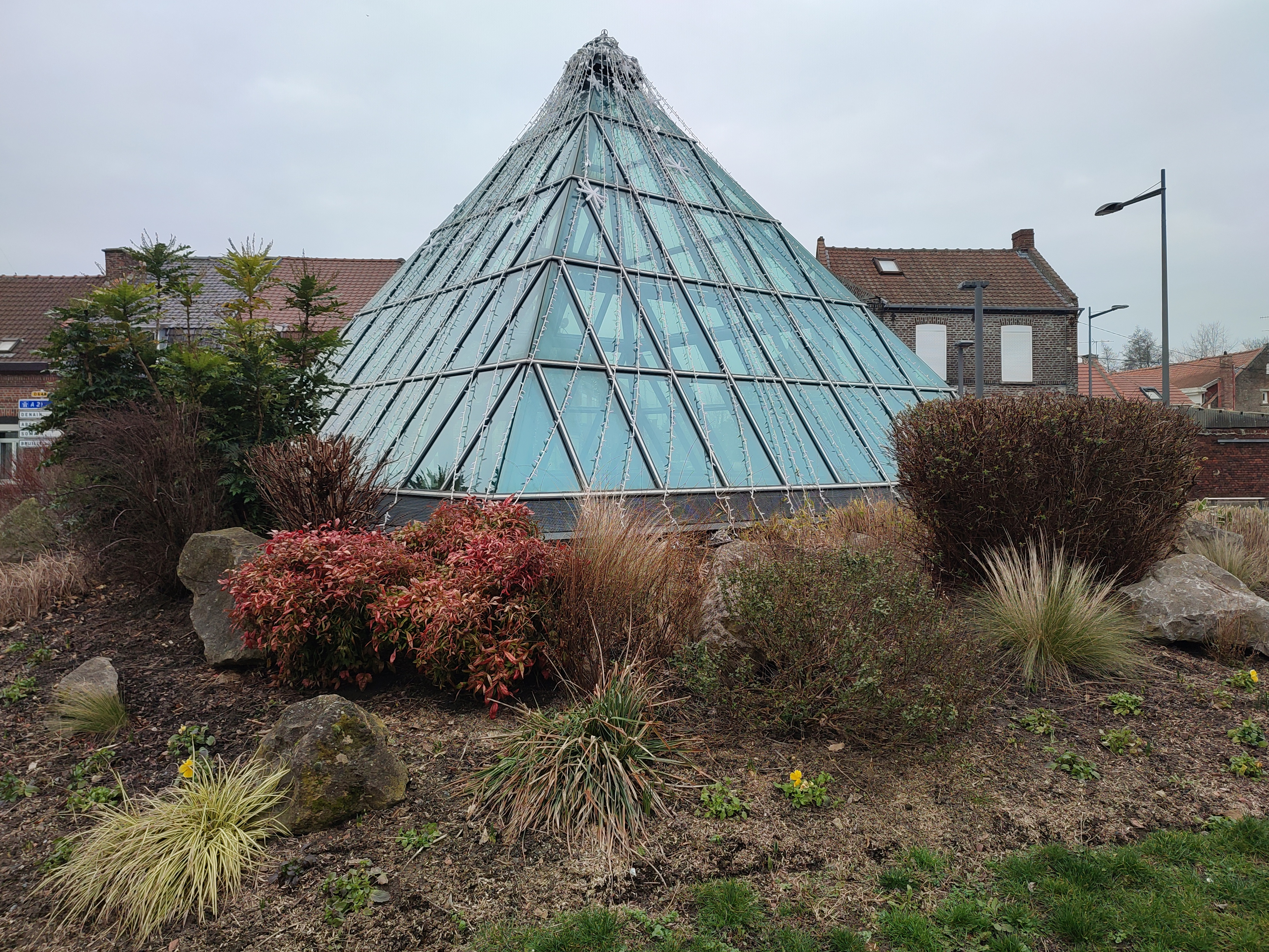
The pyramid

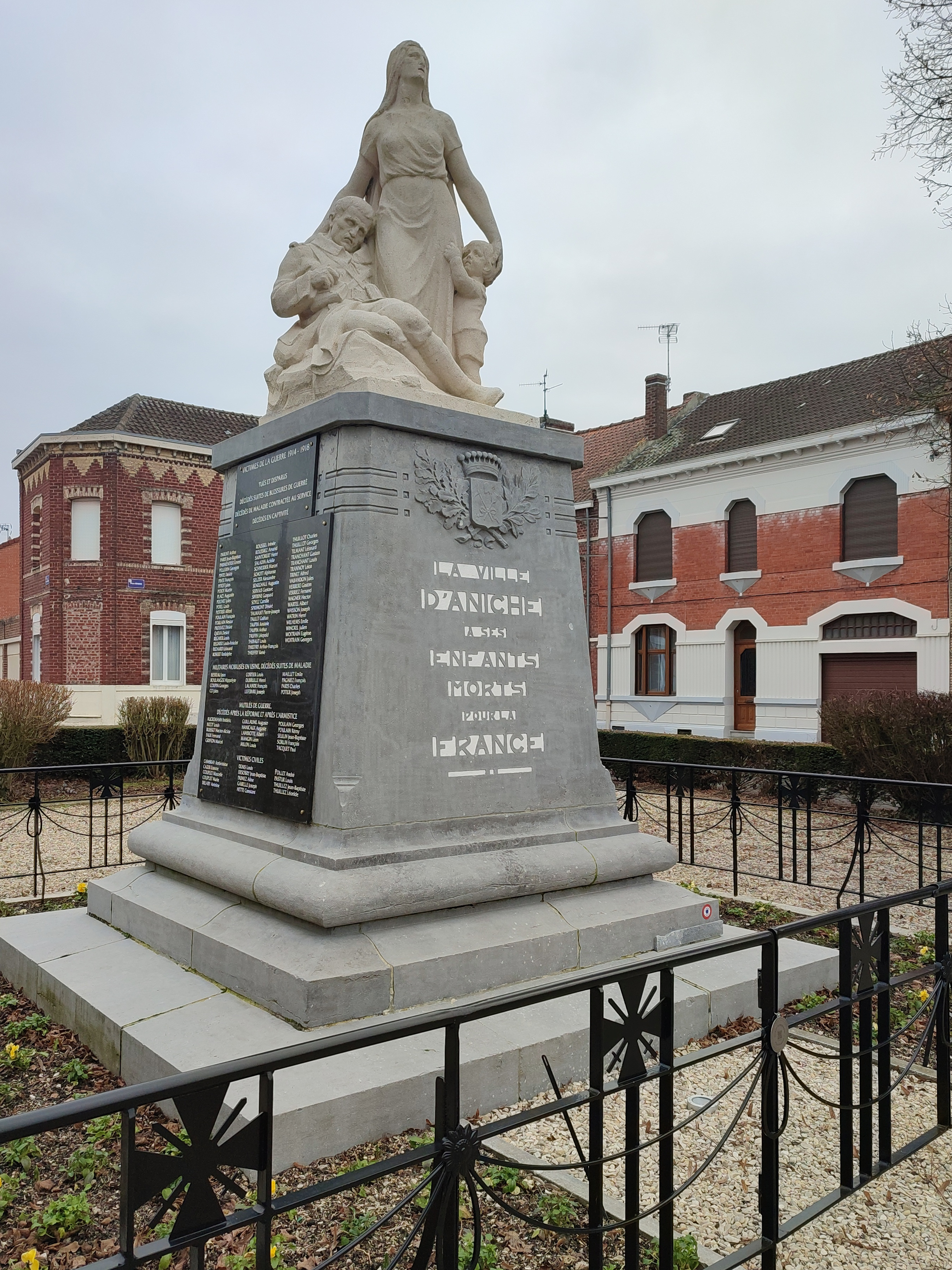
The war memorial

== Notable people linked to the commune ==
- 1770: Auguste-Louis Lanvin
- 1780: Joseph-François Désiré born in Aniche on 19 September 1780, decorated with the Legion of Honour
- 1784: Joséphine Rostkowska, Polish heroine
- 1787: Napoléon Bonaparte (1769–1821), then a junior officer billeted in the Douai barracks. He passionated about the project of Lapérouse in his expedition around the world.
- 1810: Adolphe Patoux, native of Saint-Hilaire-lez-Cambrai, former glass blower, founded a glassworks at Aniche in 1864
- 1833: Robert Eugène des Rotours, Baron of Rotours (of Chaulieu), born at Aniche on 23 October 1833, died at Paris on 28 March 1895, a lawyer, counsellor for the préfecture (1861), Mayor of Avelin (1868-1888), Member of the Legislative Chamber from 2 February 1868 to 28 March 1895, municipal councillor then Mayor of Mérignies, and general counsel for the Canton of Orchies; married in Paris on 10 May 1859 to Emma Joséphine Ghislaine van den Hecke de Lambeke; buried in the church of Avelin with his wife.
- 1835: Charles Patoux, born at Aniche on 2 February 1835. Former Mayor of Aniche, Chevalier of the Legion of Honour with Adolphe Patoux, both buried in the family vault in the central aisle of the cemetery in Aniche.
- 1885: Léon Lehuraux, Méhariste officer, writer, and ethnologist, born at Aniche on 29 December 1885, died on 8 June 1956.

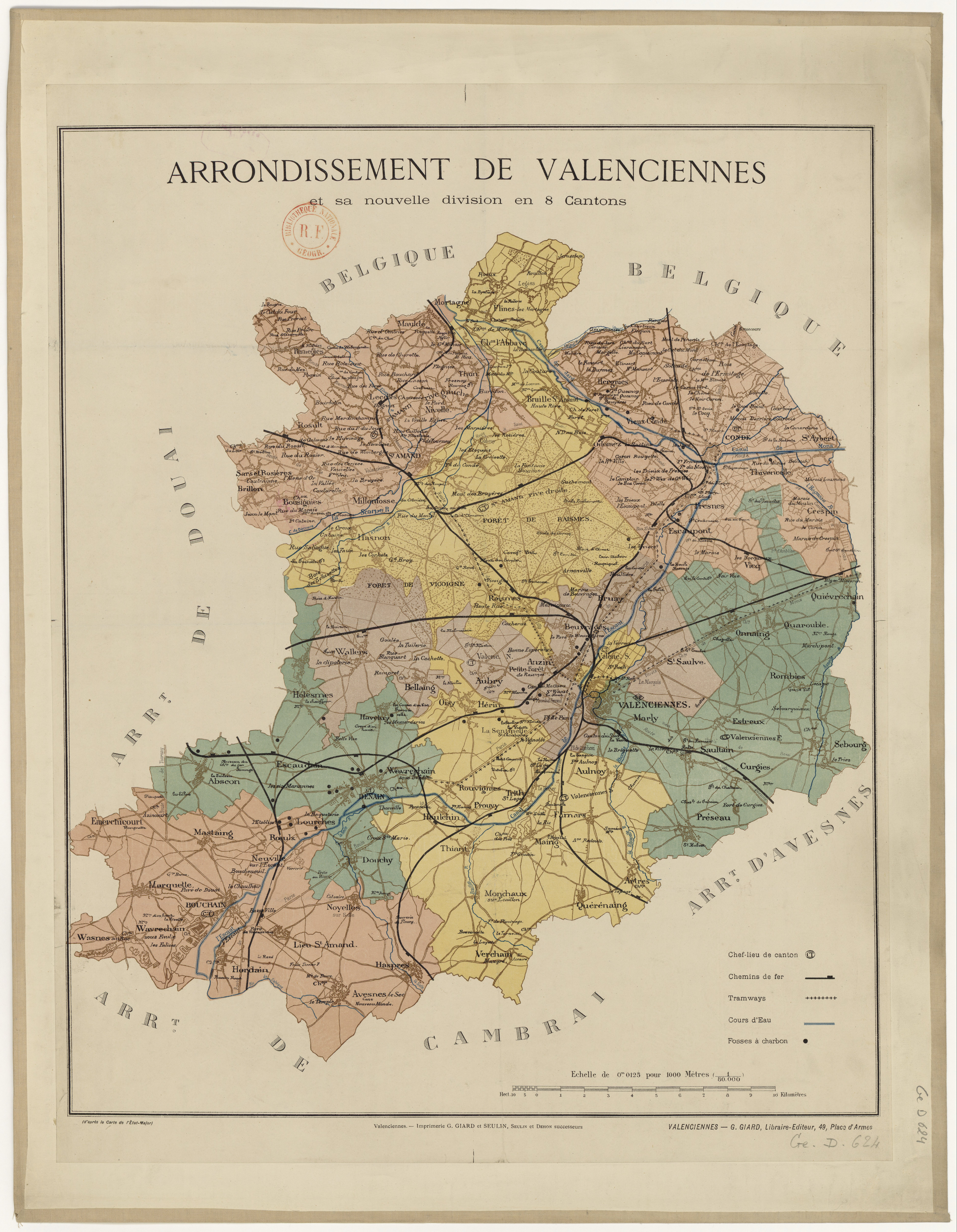
Map of the Arrondissement of Valenciennes, 1887

- 1880: Vincent van Gogh beginning in March 1880 he took his suitcase under his arm with some drawings and 10 francs to meet the painter Jules Breton who practiced at Courrières in the Pas-de-Calais. He took the train from Mons to Valenciennes, arriving in heavy rain and hurricane winds. To avoid the Forest of Raismes-Saint-Amand-Wallers, he travelled via Denain possibly by the horse-drawn tram shown on the map of the Arrondissement of Valenciennes then by Escaudain, Auberchicourt, Lewarde, then Douai to arrive at Courrières. Jules Breton was not there. His house and his workshop seemed too plush. The return trip was completely on foot in difficult conditions with a pilgrimage to Borinage. He sold some drawings for subsistence. On 24 September 1880 he wrote to his brother Theo that on the way back he finally found his way: painting. "It is for me to learn to draw or to be master of my pencil, or my charcoal, or my brush and once I got that I can do good work almost anywhere. Borinage is as picturesque as old Venice, Arabia, Brittany, Normandy, Picardy, or Brie". He still had ten years of life to achieve some 2,000 works.
- 1888: Louis Pol born at Aniche on 9 September 1888 and died there on 24 June 1958. A Glass worker; glassblower at the Union glassworks. From 1921-1955 he was Director of L'Idéal Cinéma Jacques Tati; secretary of the rescue unit of glassworkers of Aniche from 1922 to reunification in 1935. As a member of the Communist Party, he was elected mayor in December 1932 but was revoked in February 1933 because of the virulence of his public actions at the head of the municipality. Elected deputy mayor in 1935, he was removed from office in 1939 under the Daladier Decree.
- 1909: Michel Leduc, born at Aniche on 12 March 1909, died at Six-Fours-les-Plages near Toulon (Var) on 15 November 1986. Artistic Director of the Opéra de Marseille for 12 years and Director of the Municipal theatre of Avignon for 17 years.
- 1922: Georges Hugot (1922–2000), artist and sculptor, professor at the School of Fine Arts of Douai. He was the creator of numerous sculptures installed in Aniche such as the Monument of Glass and of Coal. Deputy Mayor of Aniche from 1983 to 1995, he initiated and developed cultural policy in the commune. He was responsible for the reconstruction of the "Ideal" cinema which was named L'Idéal Cinéma Jacques Tati in 1995.
- 1925: Lazare Gianessi, born in Aniche on 9 November 1925 and died on 11 August 2009 in Concarneau, a former international footballer
- 1950: Roger Facon, born in Monchecourt on 20 January 1950; was a police investigator before publishing detective novels largely inspired by his professional experience
- 1957: Michel Sanchez, musician
- 1970: Valérie Bonneton, born at Somain, actress, ex-wife of François Cluzet

== Folklore ==
Alexandre-Joseph Consil known as Kopierre was born in Auberchicourt, the neighbouring commune, on 25 May 1834 and died at the Aniche Hospice on 28 December 1909. He was Drum Major of the Saint-Cyr school during the 14 July parade in Paris in 1879. He was a picturesque character in Nord department.

== See also ==
- Communes of the Nord department
