= Rieulay =

- Commune
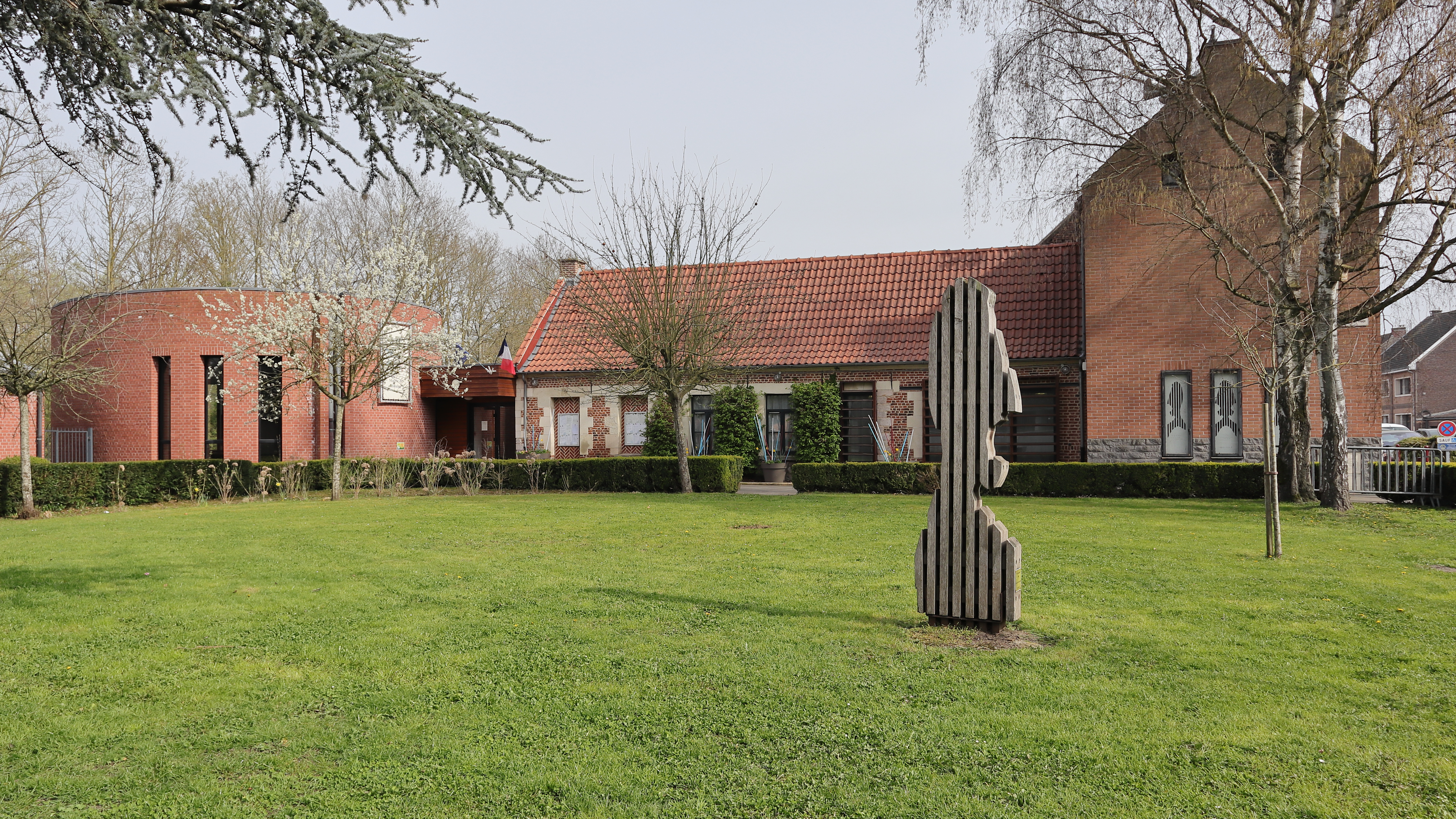
- The town hall in Rieulay

- Coat of arms
- Location of Rieulay
- Location within France Location within Hauts-de-France
- Coordinates: 50°22′50″N 3°15′28″E
- Country: France
- Region: Hauts-de-France
- Department: Nord
- Arrondissement: Douai
- Canton: Sin-le-Noble
- Intercommunality: CC Cœur d'Ostrevent

Government
  - Mayor (2020–2026): Marc Delécluse
- Area^{1}: 7.29 km^{2} (2.81 sq mi)
- Elevation: 19 m (62 ft)
- Highest elevation: 27 m (89 ft)
- Lowest elevation: 16 m (52 ft)
- Population (2023): 1,261
  - Density: 173/km^{2} (448/sq mi)
- Time zone: UTC+01:00 (CET)
  - Summer (DST): UTC+02:00 (CEST)
- INSEE/Postal code: 59501 /59870
- ^{1} French Land Register data, which excludes lakes, ponds, glaciers > 1 km^{2} (0.386 sq mi or 247 acres) and river estuaries.

Rieulay (French pronunciation: [ʁjœlɛ]) is a commune in the Nord department in northern France.

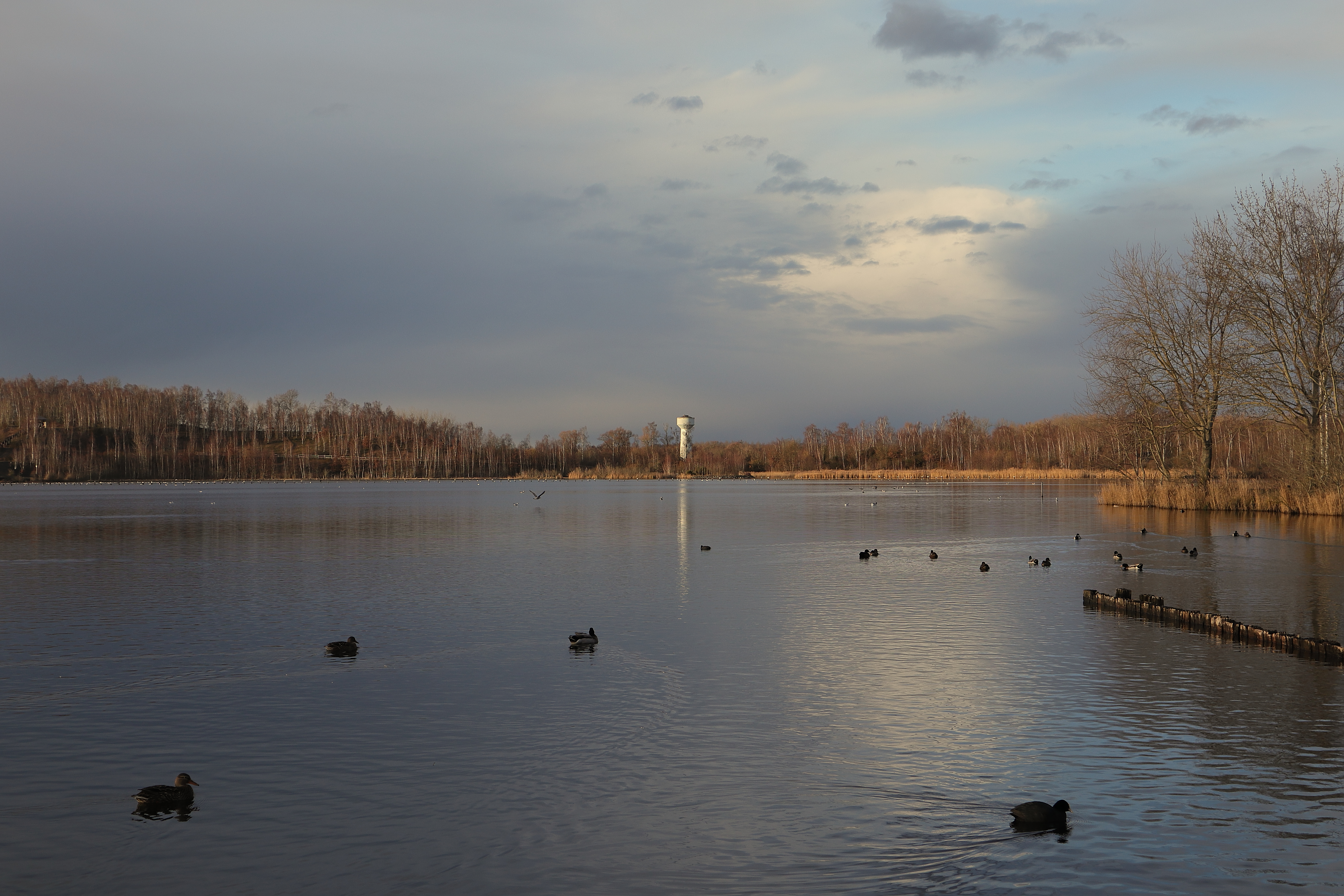
Sunset over the Argales site

== Heraldry ==
Arms of Rieulay	The arms of Rieulay are blazoned : Ermine, on a cross gules, 5 roses Or. (Aniche, Bugnicourt, and Rieulay use the same arms.)

== See also ==
- Communes of the Nord department
