= Bugnicourt =

- Commune
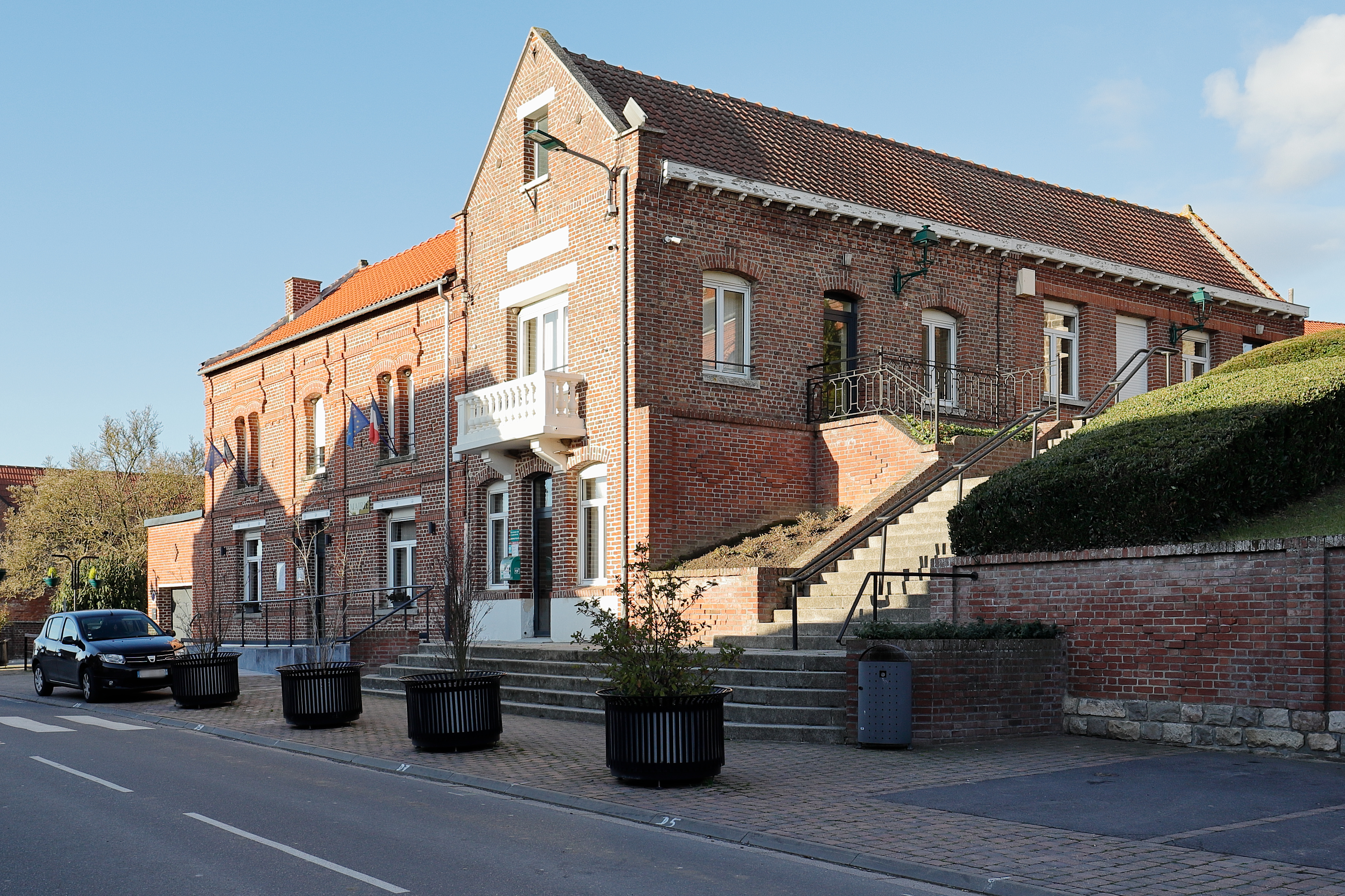
- The town hall in Bugnicourt

- Coat of arms
- Location of Bugnicourt
- Location within France Location within Hauts-de-France
- Coordinates: 50°17′30″N 3°09′24″E
- Country: France
- Region: Hauts-de-France
- Department: Nord
- Arrondissement: Douai
- Canton: Aniche
- Intercommunality: Douaisis Agglo

Government
  - Mayor (2020–2026): Christian Dordain
- Area^{1}: 6.28 km^{2} (2.42 sq mi)
- Elevation: 57 m (187 ft)
- Highest elevation: 84 m (276 ft)
- Lowest elevation: 36 m (118 ft)
- Population (2023): 1,095
  - Density: 174/km^{2} (452/sq mi)
- Time zone: UTC+01:00 (CET)
  - Summer (DST): UTC+02:00 (CEST)
- INSEE/Postal code: 59117 /59151
- ^{1} French Land Register data, which excludes lakes, ponds, glaciers > 1 km^{2} (0.386 sq mi or 247 acres) and river estuaries.

Bugnicourt (French pronunciation: [byɲikuʁ]) is a commune in the Nord department in northern France. It is located south east of Douai and east of Arras.

== Economy and culture ==
There is a small business park, Parc d'activités de la Tuilerie, which hosts a number of creative and manufacturing enterprises.

Each August, the town celebrates the annual "Fete du Boeuf" (Beef Festival).

== Population ==
Historical population
Year	Pop.	±% p.a.
1968	811	—
1975	765	−0.83%
1982	928	+2.80%
1990	934	+0.08%
1999	870	−0.79%
2007	908	+0.54%
2012	931	+0.50%
2017	1,030	+2.04%
2023	1,095	+1.03%
Source: INSEE

== Heraldry ==
Arms of Bugnicourt	The arms of Bugnicourt are blazoned : Ermine, on a cross gules, 5 roses Or. (Aniche, Bugnicourt, and Rieulay use the same arms.)

== Gallery ==
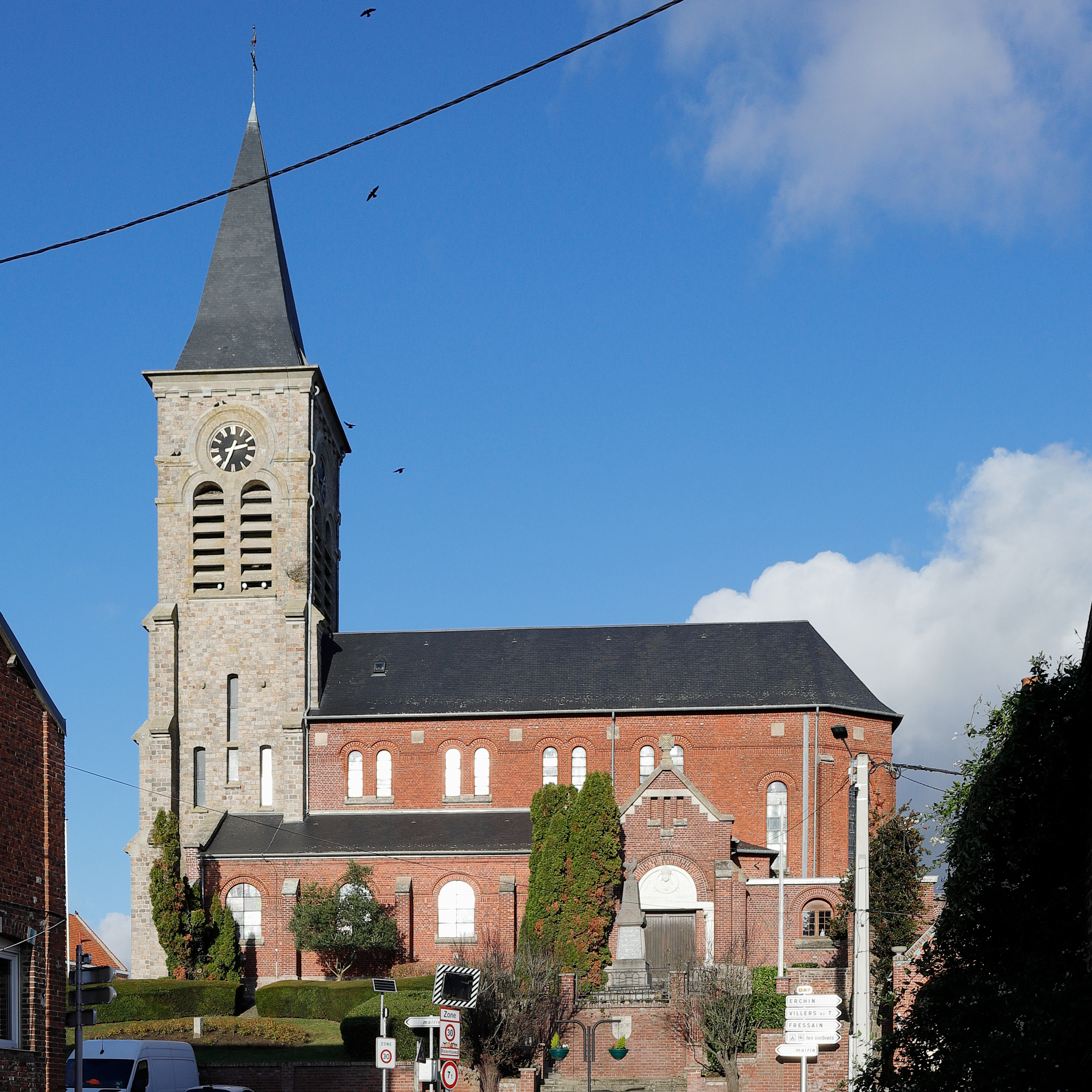
The church

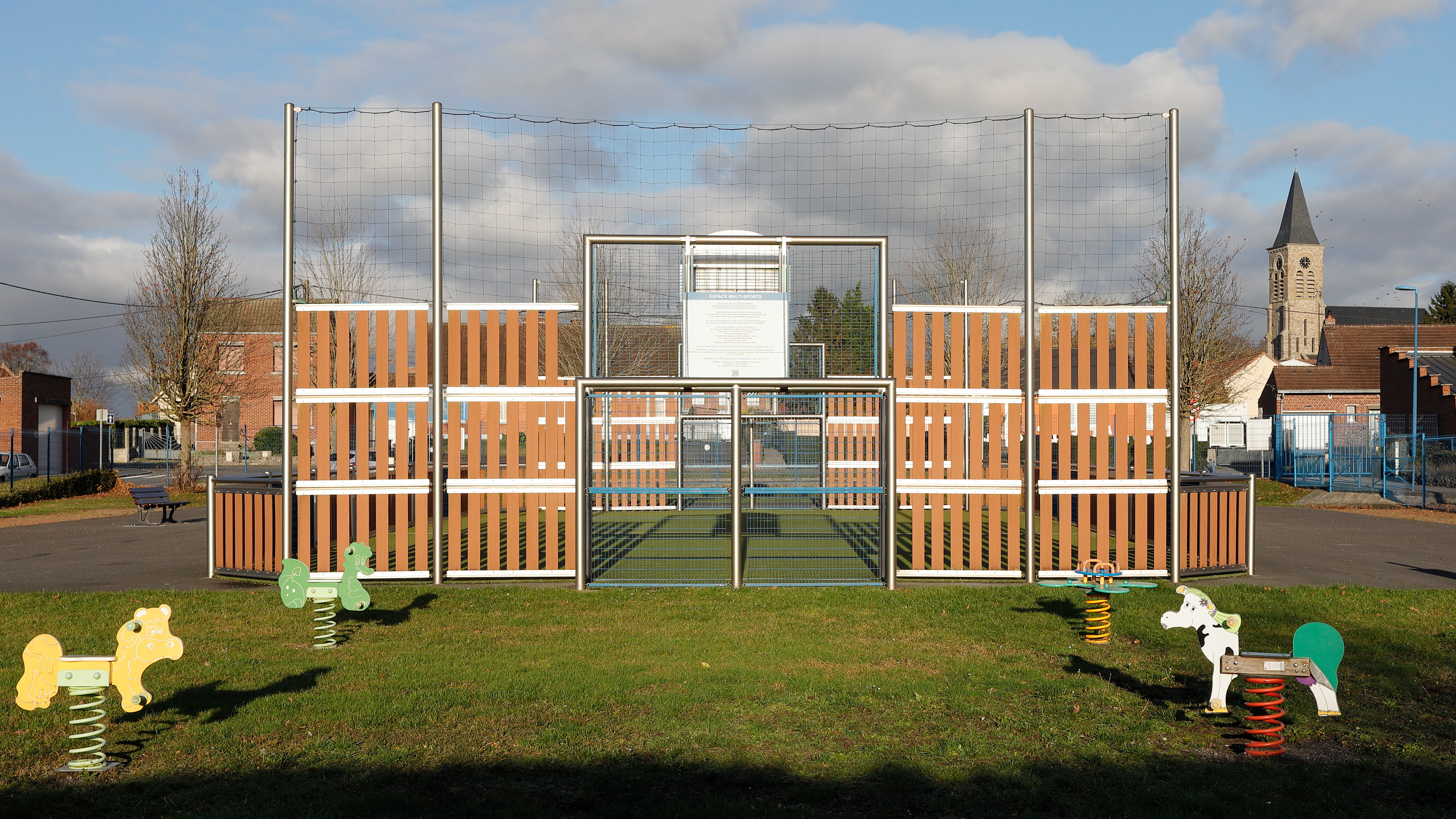
The city stadium

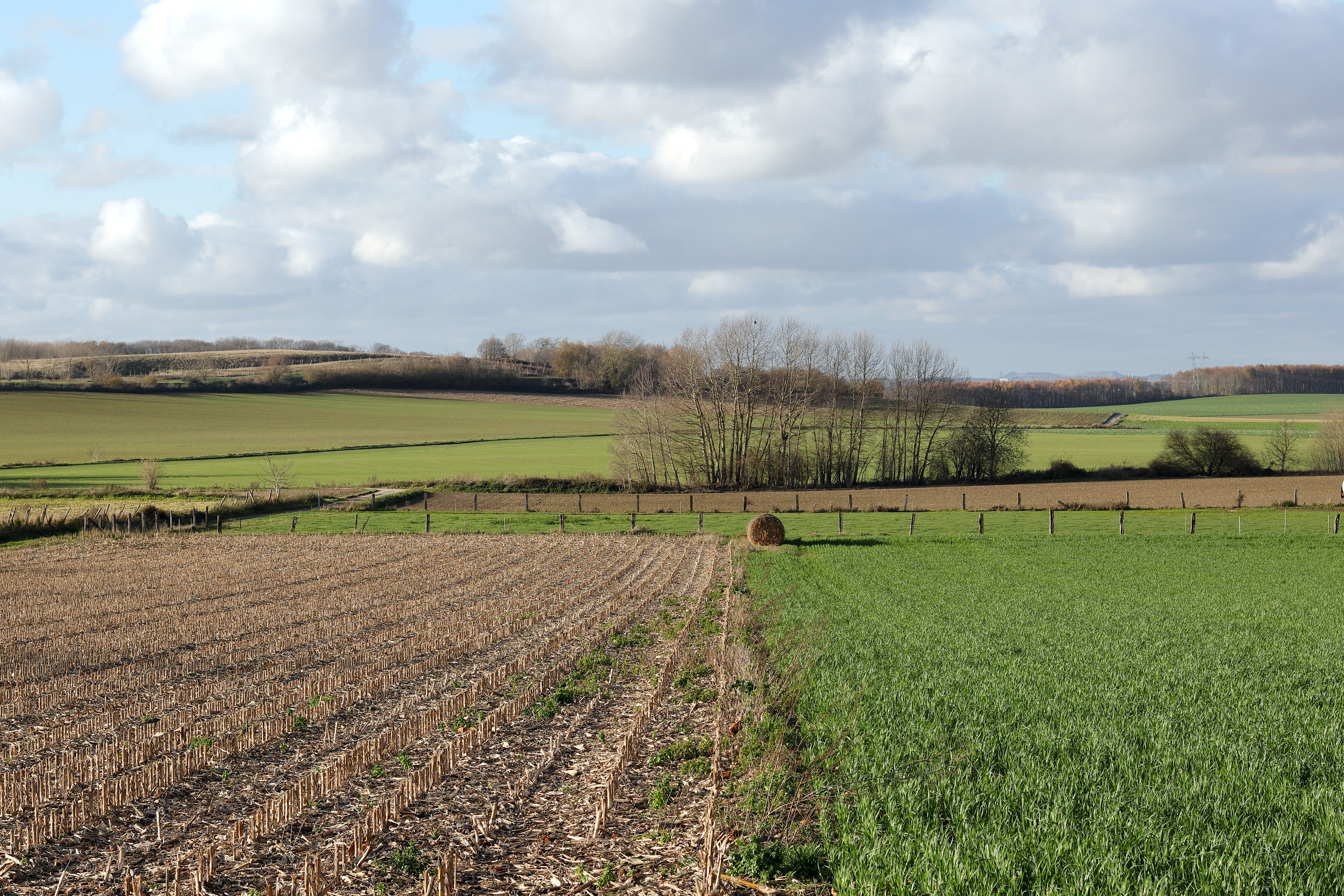
The countryside

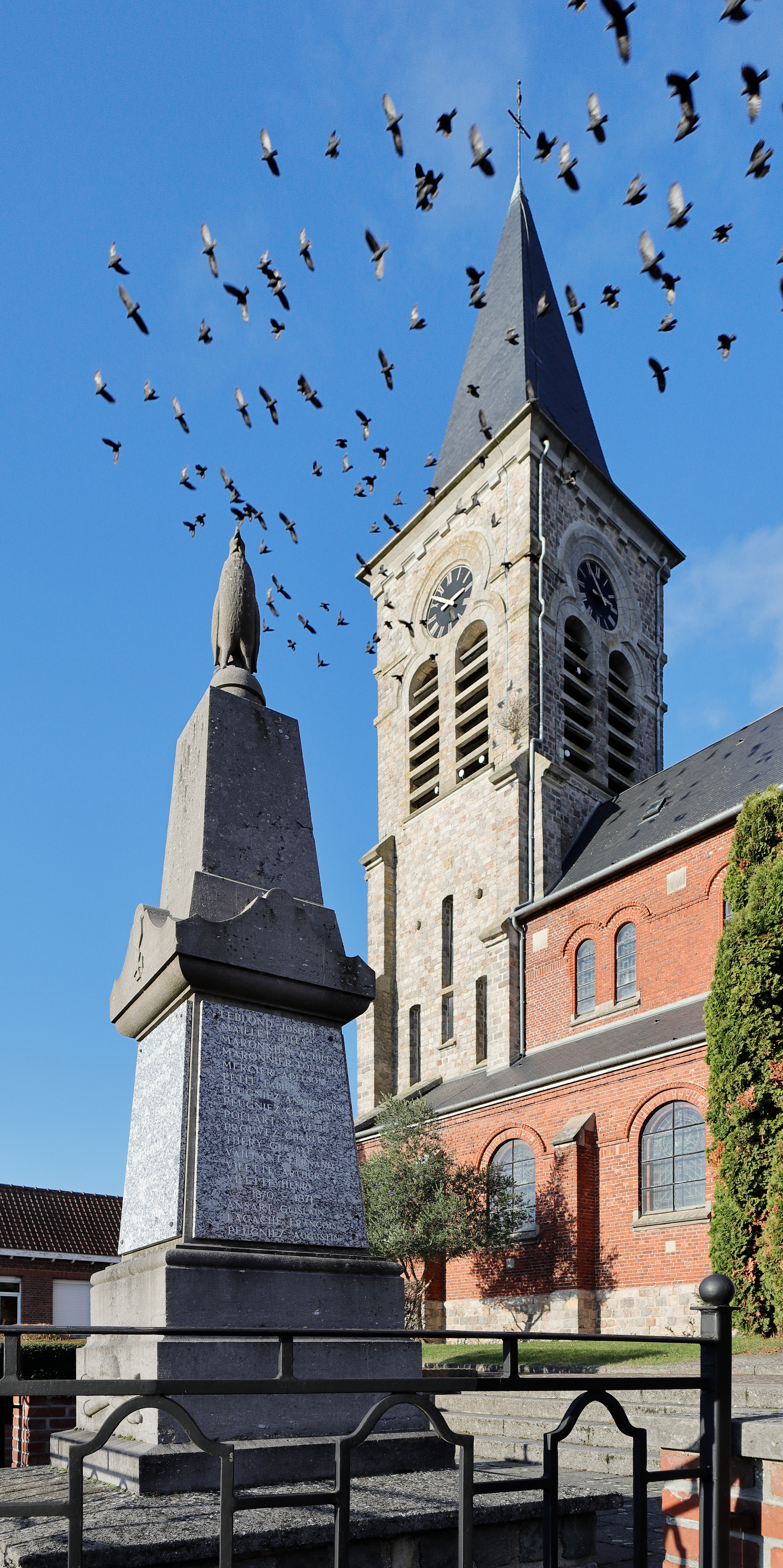
The war memorial

== See also ==
- Communes of the Nord department
