= Aniche Mining Company =

French coal mining company

Compagnie des mines d'Aniche
- Industry: Coal mining
- Founded: 11 November 1773
- Founder: Claude-Constant Juvénal d'Harville des Ursins
- Defunct: 1946
- Successor: Groupe de Douai
- Headquarters: Auberchicourt, France
- Products: Bituminous coal
- Number of employees: Up to 15,000, pre-World War II

The Aniche Mining Company (compagnie des mines d'Aniche) was a French company that operated coal mines in the Nord-Pas de Calais. The company was founded in 1773 and became part of the Groupe de Douai in 1946. Prior to World War II, the Aniche Mining Company produced over 3 million tons of coal per year, and employed 15,000 workers.
