= L'Idéal Cinéma Jacques Tati =

Idéal cinéma Jacques Tati
- Centre culturel Claude Berri
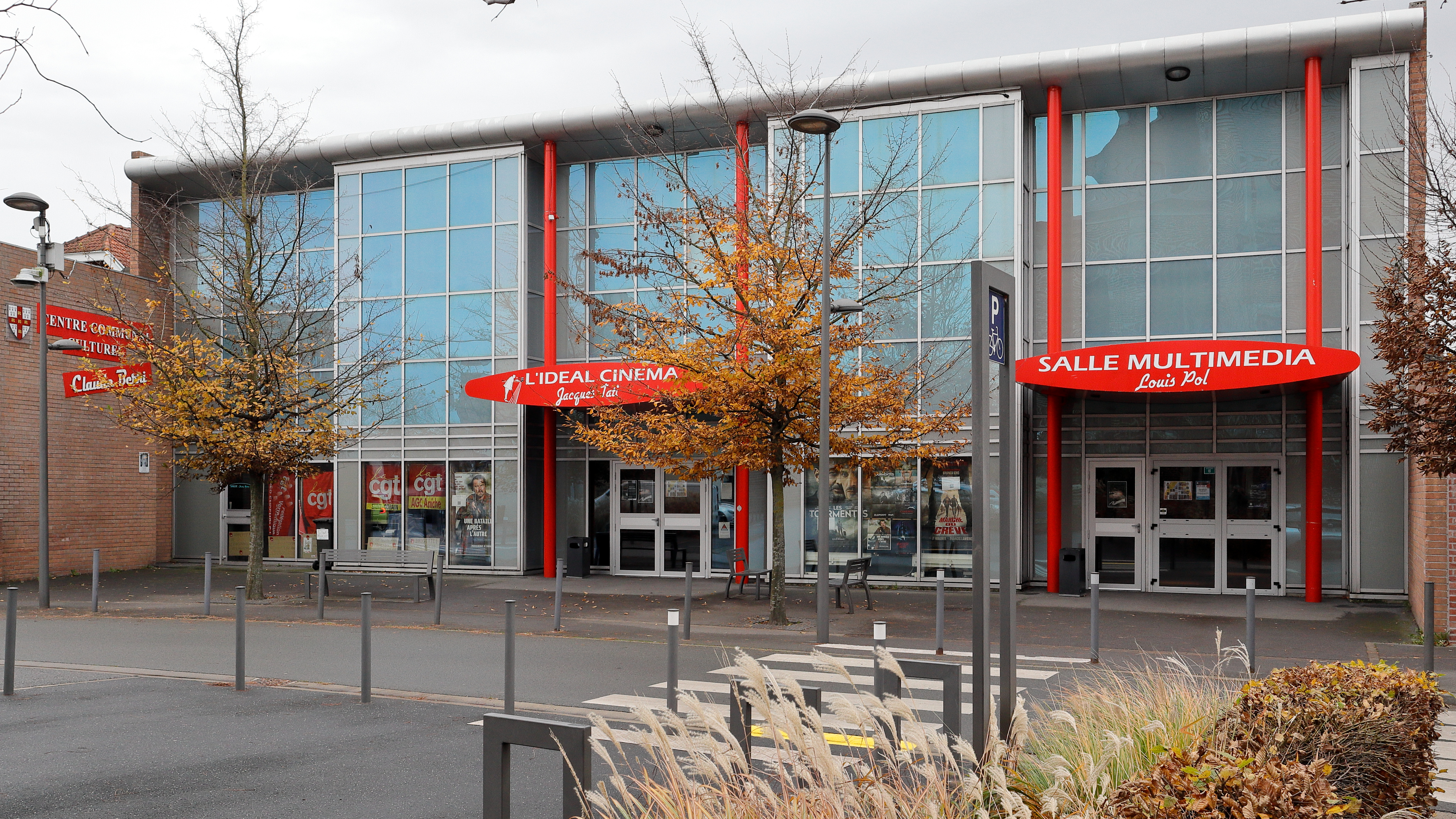
- L'Idéal Cinéma Jacques Tati and the Louis Pol room
- Interactive map of Idéal cinéma Jacques Tati
- Former names: La Salle de L’Hôtel du Syndicat CGT, Splendid Cinéma, Hôtel du Syndicat, L'Idéal Cinéma
- Address: 10 Rue Wambrouck
- Location: Aniche, France
- Coordinates: 50°19′50″N 3°15′07″E
- Owner: City of Aniche
- Capacity: 187
- Type: cinema

Construction
- Built: 1994-1995
- Opened: June 3, 1995
- Renovated: 2012
- Demolished: Idéal Cinema (original) demolished in 1993

L'Idéal Cinéma Jacques Tati is a cinema in Aniche, France, built in 1995 on the site of the old L'Idéal Cinéma demolished in 1993. It is named in honor of the French filmmaker Jacques Tati.

The original building was constructed for La Chambre Syndicale des Verriers (Glass Workers' Union), and inaugurated as the local headquarters of the General Confederation of Labour (CGT) on 26 January 1902. The cinema's first public film performance took place on 23 November 1905. Since then, the building has been renovated several times, and its former names include La Salle de L’Hôtel du Syndicat CGT and Splendid Cinéma à L'Hôtel du Syndicat. The old building was demolished in 1993 and it was replaced with the Centre Culturel Claude Berri including the movie theatre L'Idéal Cinéma Jacques Tati in 1995.

== History ==
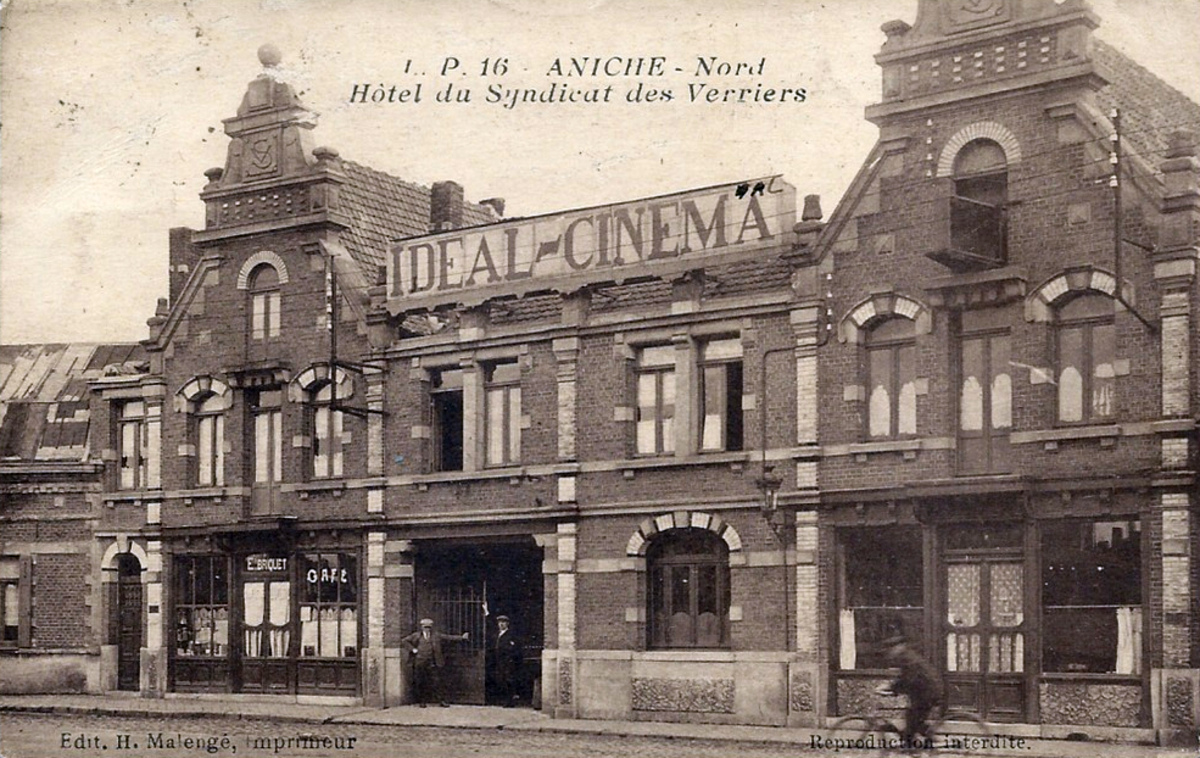
L'Idéal Cinéma (demolished in 1993

=== 1900–1903: Construction and opening ===
At the turn of the 20th century, Aniche was a town with a population of about 8000 that was centered around the coal and glass industry. La Chambre Syndicale des Verriers (Glass Workers Union), which had at its peak about 1800 members, was part of the General Confederation of Labour (CGT). In 1900, under the chairmanship of Albert and Paul Gallet Quévy, the union purchased land on Rue de la Pyramide (later named Rue Wambrouck) for sixteen thousand francs, for the purpose of constructing a new headquarters and to have a large multi-purpose hall for meetings and events. Construction took place from 1900 to 1901 for L’Hôtel du Syndicat CGT. On 26 January 1902, the building was inaugurated with Charles Adolphe Scelles as mayor. Besides meetings, the hall had its first cinema performance on 18 January 1903. This makes it the oldest workers' (publicly run) cinema in the world.

On 23 November 1905, the meeting hall had its first film viewing. The film showcased was the 1902 French silent film A Trip to the Moon by Georges Méliès, just 14 minutes long. The seat capacity at the time was 600. The management frequently welcomed Pathé and Gaumont, but signed with the Splendid Cinéma company. It would showcase performances in three parts; each part would contain three different films. The cinema's manager was Eloi Joseph Lanoy, who became mayor of Aniche in 1910. When Splendid Cinéma withdrew in 1911, the management worked with Excelsior-Rehauss and Rex Cinema to continue showing films. On 21 December 1912, the management responded to a decree to separate the projection room from the seating, and to attach the seats to the floor. Louis Pol took over as a manager. The cinema was renamed to L'Idéal Cinéma.

=== World Wars ===
During World War I, the cinema was used by the Hispano-American Committee, under the auspices of the Red Cross, to deliver food supplies to the region until 31 March 1919. In 1922, the management purchased a projector for 22,915 francs. The union's numbers dropped to about 400 members in 1925, and had to deal with a crisis in the glass industry in 1927. The union eventually recovered, and in 1936, the cinema seating grew to 850. The cinema also faced competition from Royal Cinéma. In May 1940, when the Germans occupied Aniche, the building's ownership was transferred to the town. During World War II, the management was required to keep the lights on during the projection of propaganda newsreels produced by Die Deutsche Wochenschau, in order to identify disruptors and demonstrators.

=== 1950–1977 (closure) ===
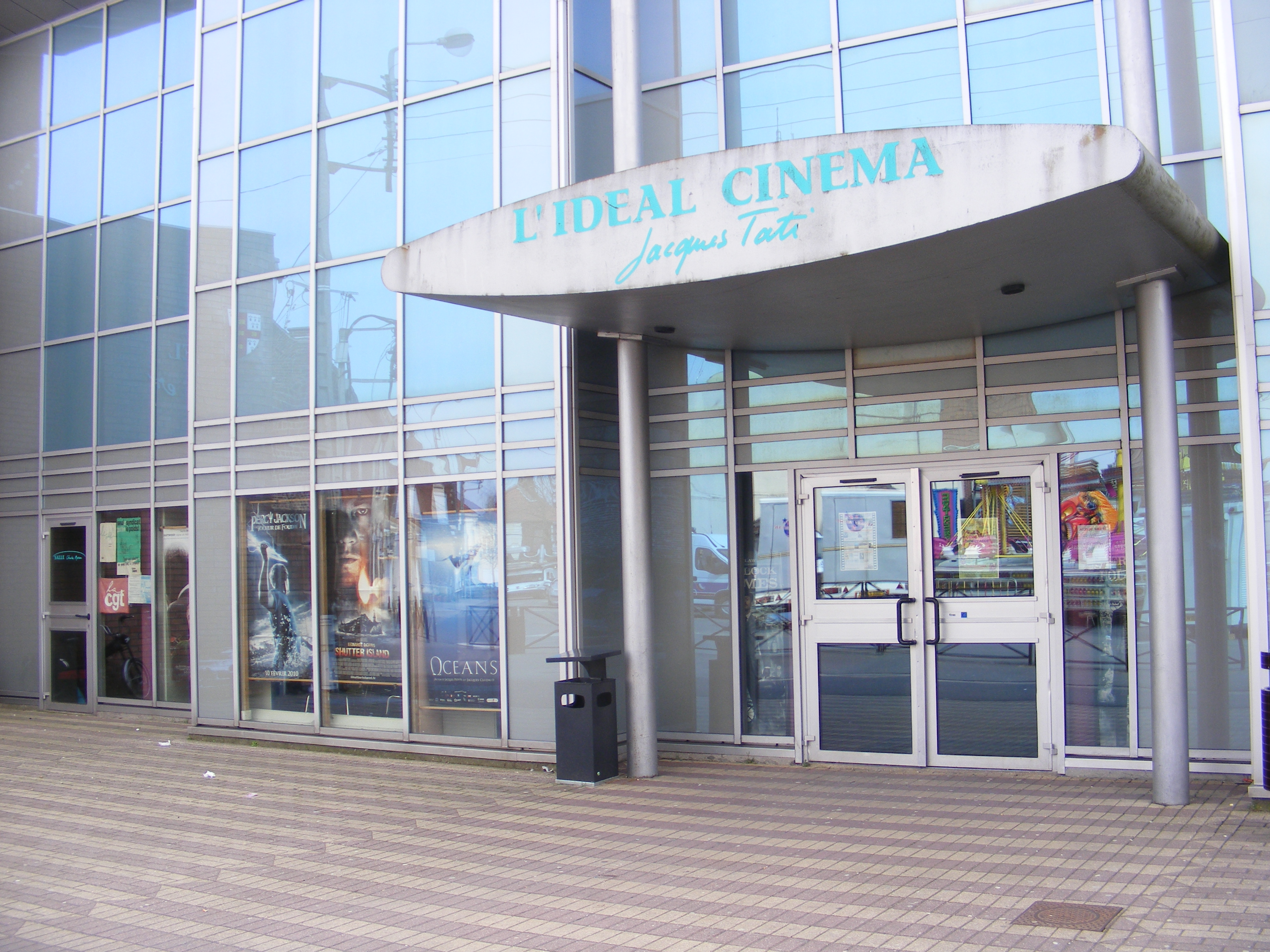
L'Idéal Cinéma Jacques Tati in 2011

After World War II, the cinema enjoyed increased activity with the influx of American films that had been banned during the occupation, but had a decline in the 1950s as moviegoers began watching television. In 1955, Pol retired, and the cinema hired Charles Moreau, who planned a renovation of the lower facade of the building in 1960. On 30 June 1967, the Royal Cinéma closed its doors, making L'Idéal Cinéma the sole cinema in town. In 1976, Alain Moret succeeded Moreau as manager of the cinema. On 4 February 1977, the cinema was forced to close for not complying with municipal security regulations. In 1981, there were brief negotiations to reopen the building.

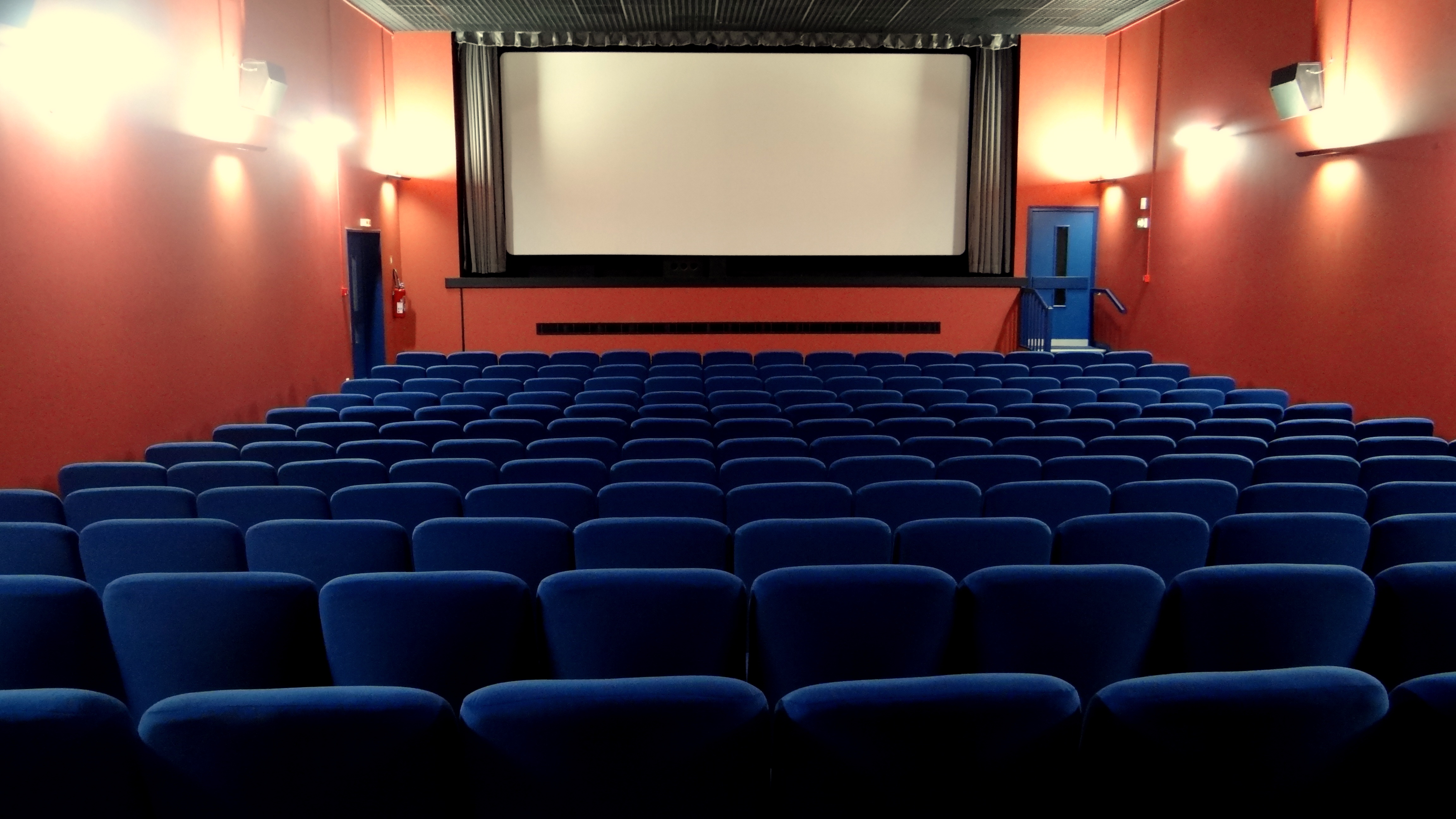
Inside L'Idéal Cinéma Jacques Tati

=== 1991–1995: Demolition and construction of a new cinema ===
On 28 January 1991, Mayor Michel Meurdesoif and Rene Gumez, the secretary general of the Union des Syndicats CGT des Verriers d'Aniche, signed a lease agreement to build a Cultural Center including a new movie theater. With manager Alain Moret, they commissioned artist and sculptor Georges Hugot to design a cultural establishment including a new cinema. On June 3, 1995, the Centre culturel Claude-Berri is inaugurated. It's made up of the Ideal Cinema Jacques Tati cinema room and the Louis Pol multipurpose room.

On 31 December 2012, the cinema celebrated the arrival of a 3D digital system, as well as new seats and decor. It accommodates 187 seats and provides access for those with reduced mobility.
