= Monchecourt =

- Commune
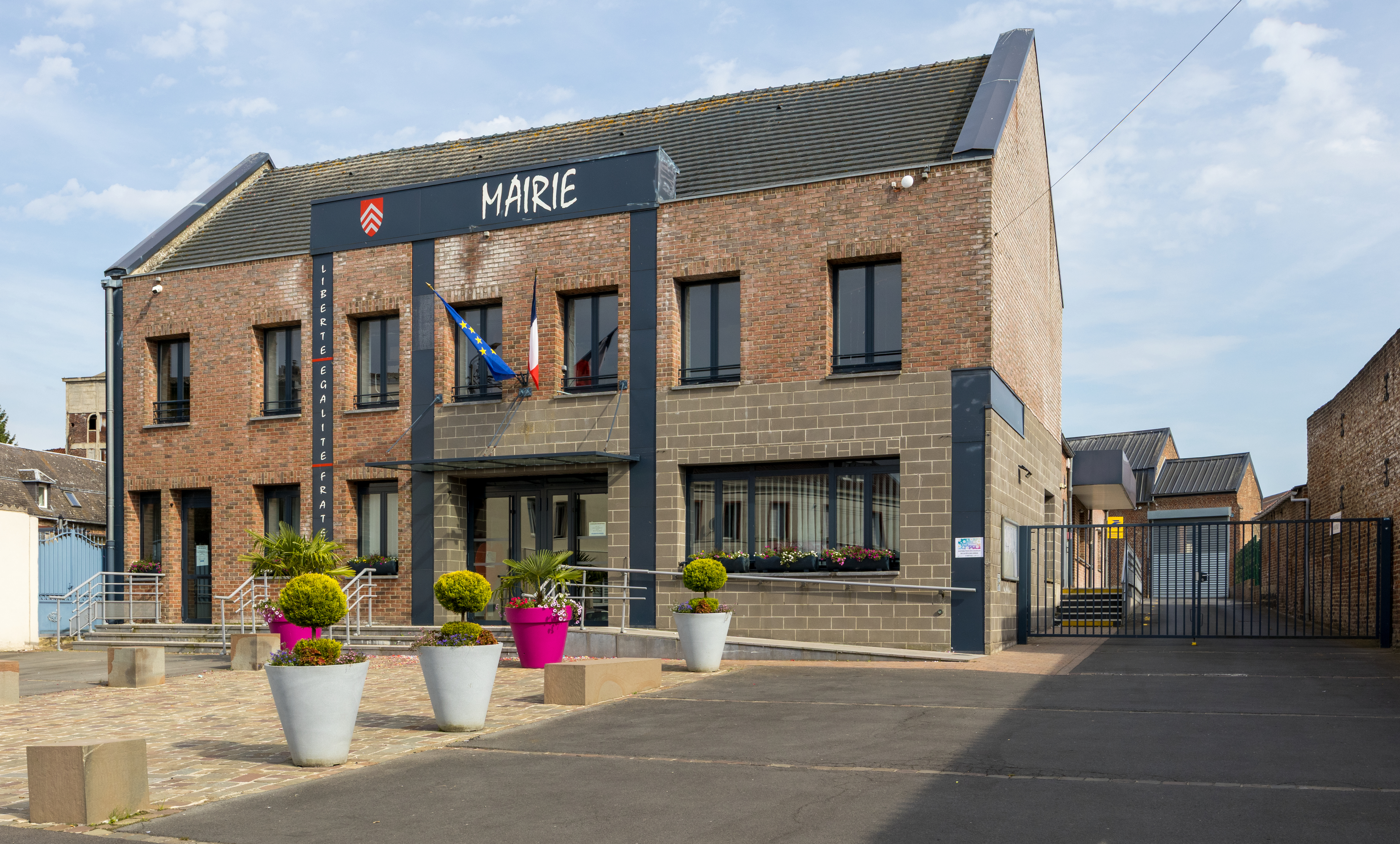
- The town hall in Monchecourt

- Coat of arms
- Location of Monchecourt
- Location within France Location within Hauts-de-France
- Coordinates: 50°18′16″N 3°12′37″E
- Country: France
- Region: Hauts-de-France
- Department: Nord
- Arrondissement: Douai
- Canton: Aniche
- Intercommunality: Cœur d'Ostrevent

Government
  - Mayor (2023–2026): Jeanne Roman
- Area^{1}: 6.77 km^{2} (2.61 sq mi)
- Elevation: 58 m (190 ft)
- Highest elevation: 66 m (217 ft)
- Lowest elevation: 48 m (157 ft)
- Population (2023): 2,516
  - Density: 372/km^{2} (963/sq mi)
- Time zone: UTC+01:00 (CET)
  - Summer (DST): UTC+02:00 (CEST)
- INSEE/Postal code: 59409 /59234
- ^{1} French Land Register data, which excludes lakes, ponds, glaciers > 1 km^{2} (0.386 sq mi or 247 acres) and river estuaries.

Monchecourt (French pronunciation: [mɔ̃ʃkuʁ]) is a commune in the Nord department in northern France.

== Population ==
Historical population
Year	Pop.	±% p.a.
1968	2,068	—
1975	1,790	−2.04%
1982	2,051	+1.96%
1990	2,599	+3.00%
1999	2,900	+1.23%
2007	2,674	−1.01%
2012	2,536	−1.05%
2017	2,502	−0.27%
2023	2,516	+0.09%
Source: INSEE

== The Saint Roch mine slag heap ==
The Saint Roch mine site has been converted into a natural space by the Department of the North.

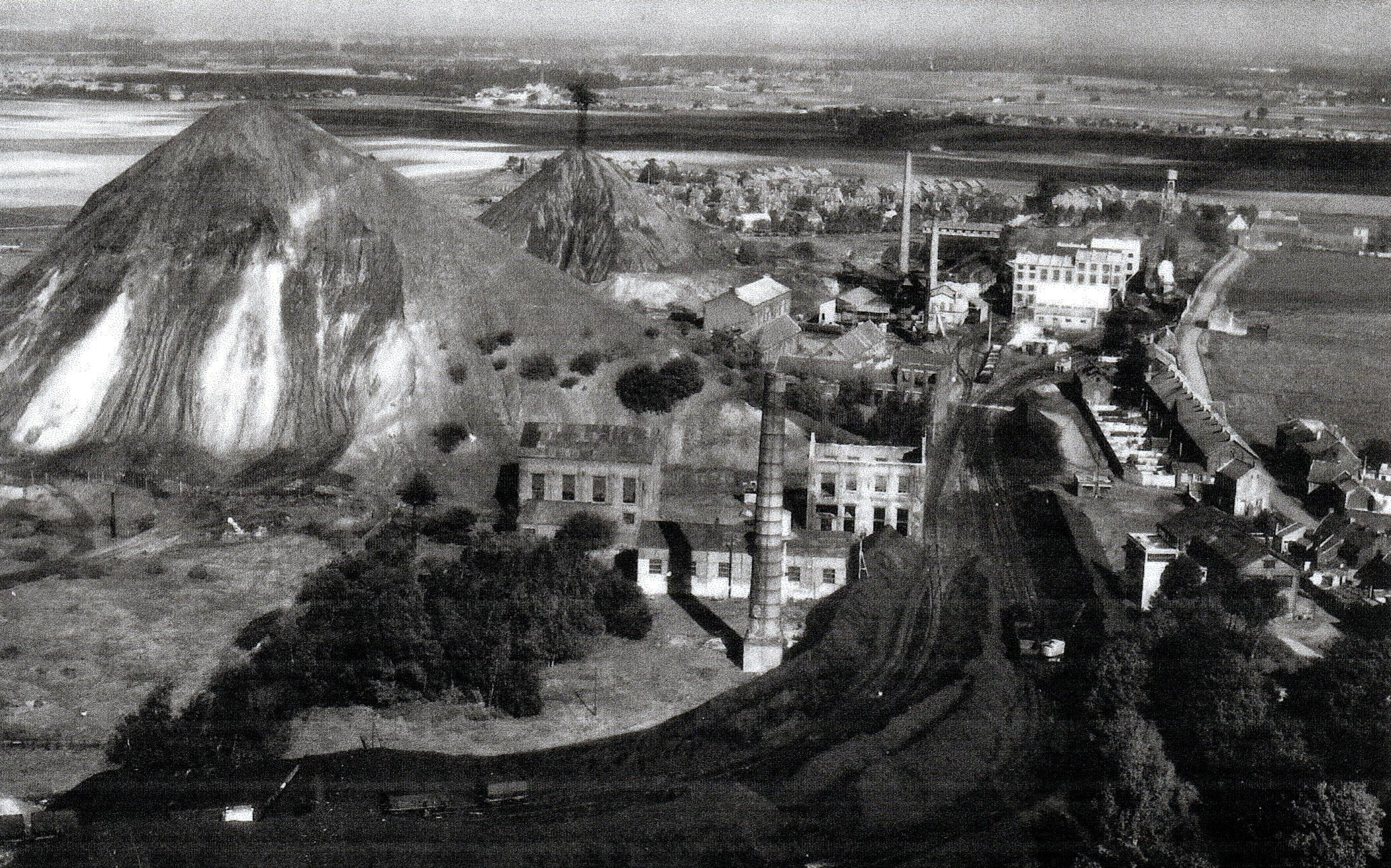
The pit around 1950

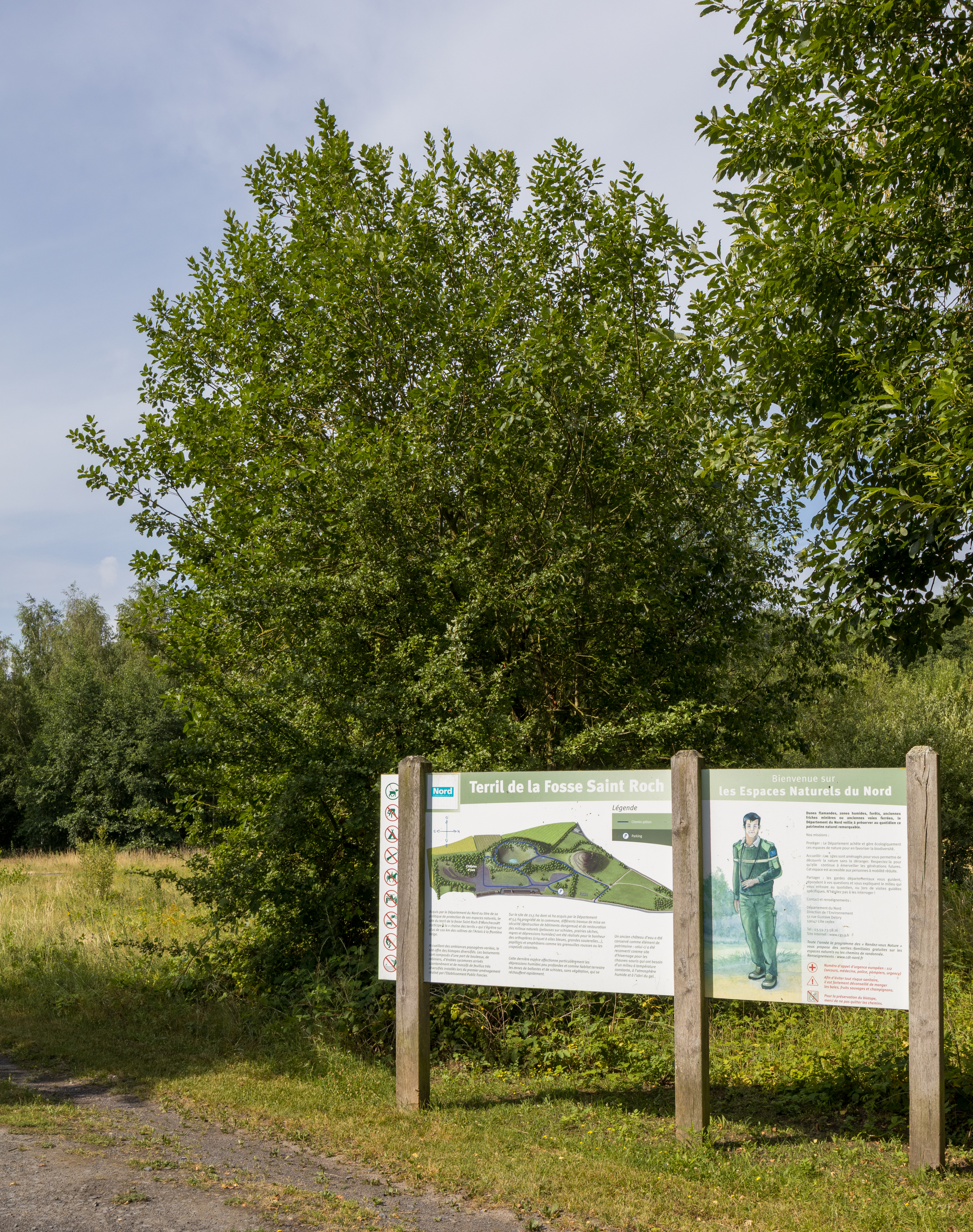

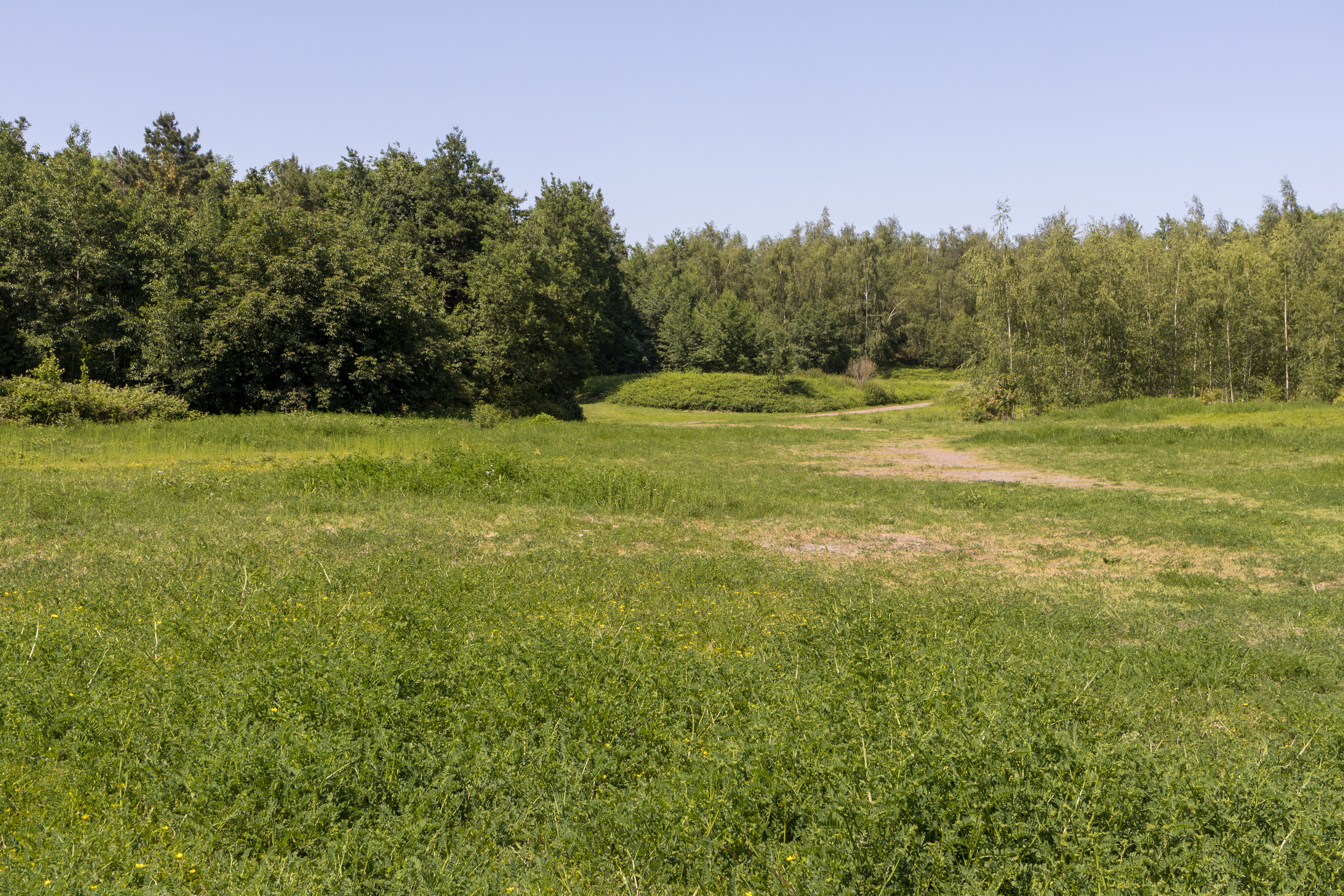

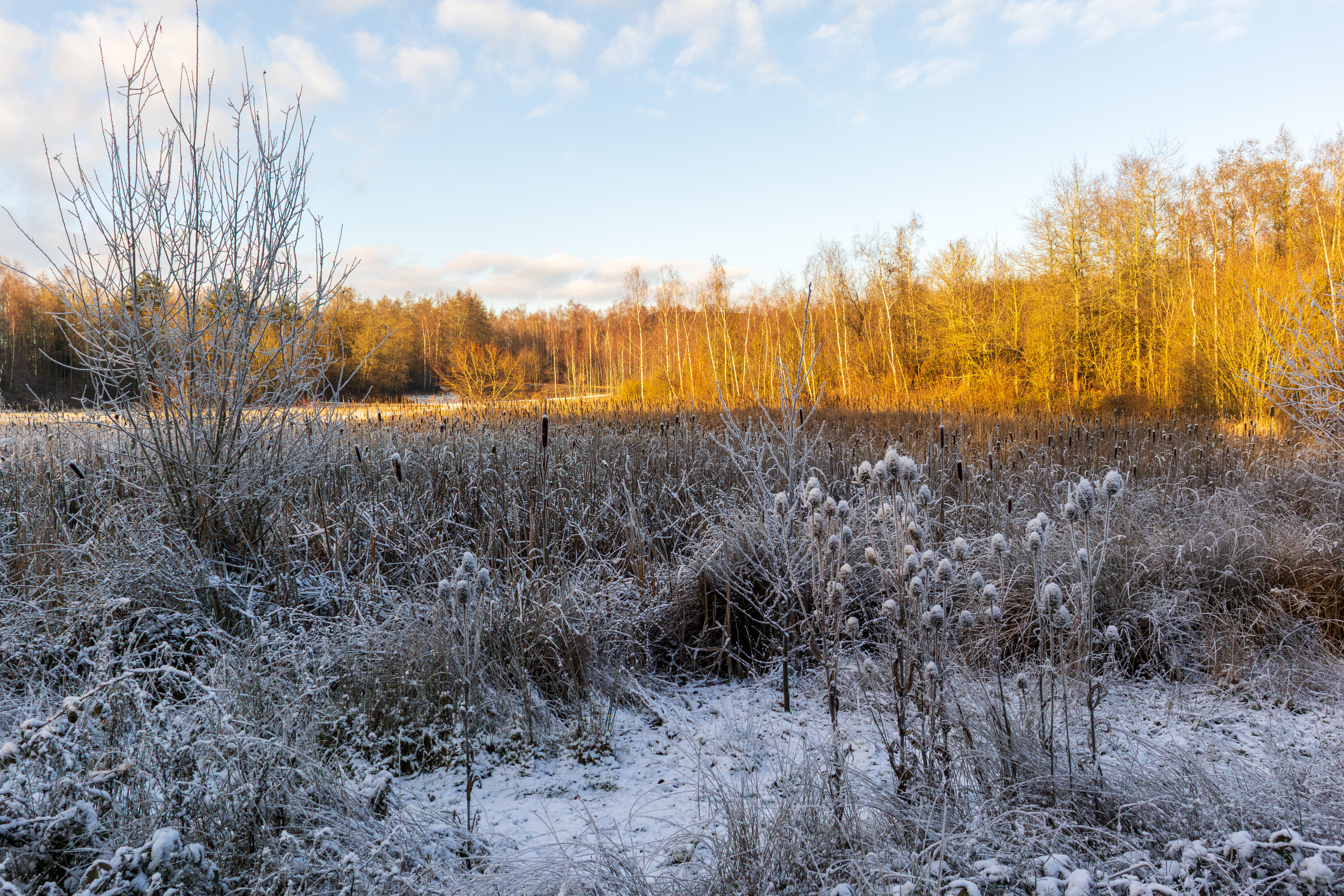
In winter

== Heraldry ==
Arms of Monchecourt	The arms of Monchecourt are blazoned : Gules, 3 chevrons argent.

== See also ==
- Communes of the Nord department
