= Auberchicourt =

- Commune
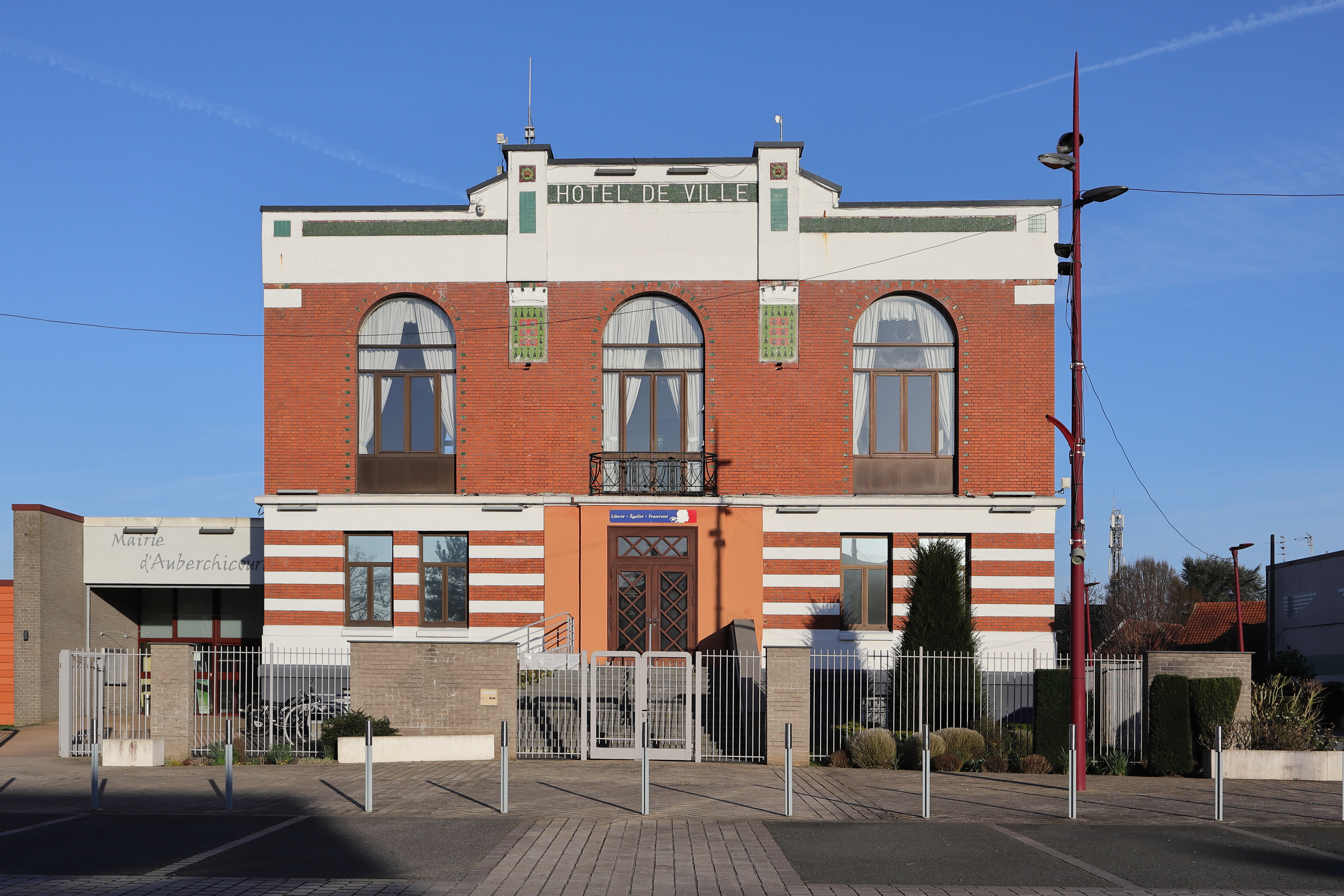
- Town hall

- Coat of arms
- Location of Auberchicourt
- Location within France Location within Hauts-de-France
- Coordinates: 50°20′00″N 3°14′00″E
- Country: France
- Region: Hauts-de-France
- Department: Nord
- Arrondissement: Douai
- Canton: Aniche
- Intercommunality: Cœur d'Ostrevent

Government
  - Mayor (2022–2026): Marie-Hélène Leroy
- Area^{1}: 7.12 km^{2} (2.75 sq mi)
- Elevation: 50 m (160 ft)
- Highest elevation: 63 m (207 ft)
- Lowest elevation: 21 m (69 ft)
- Population (2023): 4,626
  - Density: 650/km^{2} (1,680/sq mi)
- Time zone: UTC+01:00 (CET)
  - Summer (DST): UTC+02:00 (CEST)
- INSEE/Postal code: 59024 /59165
- ^{1} French Land Register data, which excludes lakes, ponds, glaciers > 1 km^{2} (0.386 sq mi or 247 acres) and river estuaries.

Auberchicourt (French pronunciation: [obɛʁʃikuʁ]) is a commune in the Nord department in northern France.

== Population ==
Historical population

Year	Pop.	±% p.a.
1793	763	—
1821	1,077	+1.24%
1846	1,462	+1.23%
1872	1,946	+1.11%
1901	2,948	+1.44%
1926	3,979	+1.21%
1946	3,865	−0.15%
1962	5,085	+1.73%
1968	5,369	+0.91%

Year	Pop.	±% p.a.
1975	5,292	−0.21%
1982	4,826	−1.31%
1990	4,733	−0.24%
1999	4,556	−0.42%
2007	4,570	+0.04%
2012	4,450	−0.53%
2017	4,448	−0.01%
2023	4,626	+0.66%

Source: EHESS and INSEE (1968-2023)

== See also ==
- Communes of the Nord department
