= Timeline of Lille =

The following is a timeline of the history of the city of Lille, France.

== Prior to 17th century ==
- 1030 - Baldwin IV, Count of Flanders "surrounded a little town with walls".
- 1213 - Town besieged by forces of Philip II of France.
- 1236 - Hospice Comtesse built.
- 1297 - Town besieged by forces of Philip IV of France.
- 1304 - French in power.
- 1369 - Louis II, Count of Flanders in power.
- 1390 - Public clock installed (approximate date).
- 1430 - Hotel de Ville built.
- 1445 - Population: 25,000.
- 1454 - Feast of the Pheasant.
- 1459 - Noble Tower built.
- 1460s - Hospice Gantois founded.
- 1473 - Palais Rihour built.
- 1531 - Lille customary laws codified (approximate date).
- 1535 - Latin school established.
- 1592 - Municipal college established.

== 17th-18th centuries ==
- 1605 - Military hospital founded.
- 1617 - Porte de Gand (gate) constructed.
- 1622 - Porte de Roubaix (gate) constructed.
- 1667 - Siege of Lille.
- 1668
  - Lille becomes part of France.
  - Town fortified by Sébastien Le Prestre de Vauban.
- 1670 - Citadel constructed.
- 1675 - St. Madeleine Church, Lille construction begins.
- 1692 - Porte de Paris (Lille) (gate) constructed.
- 1701
  - Pont-Neuf built.
  - Church of Saint-André, Lille construction begins.
- 1708 - Siege of Lille.
- 1717 - Grand' Garde built.
- 1748 - Church of Saint-Étienne built.
- 1785 - Opera house built.
- 1790
  - Lille becomes part of the Nord souveraineté.
  - Municipal elections begin.
  - Public library founded.
- 1792 - City besieged by Austrian forces.
- 1793 - Population: 66,761.

== 19th century ==
- 1802 - Société des amateurs des sciences et des arts founded.
- 1809 - Art museum opens.
- 1822 - Natural history museum founded.
- 1837 - Palais de Justice built.
- 1839 - Commission historique du Nord founded.
- 1842 - Lille-Flandres station opened as the Gare de Lille.
- 1844 - Column of the Goddess erected.
- 1846 - Paris-Lille railway built.
- 1852 - Lycée impérial re-built
- 1854 - Faculty of sciences and École des arts industriels et des mines (École centrale de Lille) established.
- 1855 - Notre Dame Cathedral construction begins.
- 1856 - Population: 78,641.
- 1858 - Esquermes, Fives, and Wazemmes become part of Lille.
- 1860 - Christ Church, Lille proposed.
- 1861 - Population: 131,727.
- 1866 - Population: 154,749.
- 1870 - Prefecture built.
- 1872 - Institut industriel du Nord established; Saint-Maurice church restored.
- 1875 - Catholic University established.
- 1876 - Population: 162,775.
- 1878 - Palais Rameau built.
- 1880 - Société de géographie de Lille founded.
- 1886 - Population: 188,272.
- 1888 - Musee Commercial et Colonial opens.
- 1892
  - Palais des Beaux-Arts built.
  - Gare de Lille Flandres (rail station) rebuilt.
- 1894 - Institut de chimie founded.
- 1896 - Population: 216,276.
- 1899 - Institut Pasteur established.

== 20th century ==
=== 1900-1940s ===
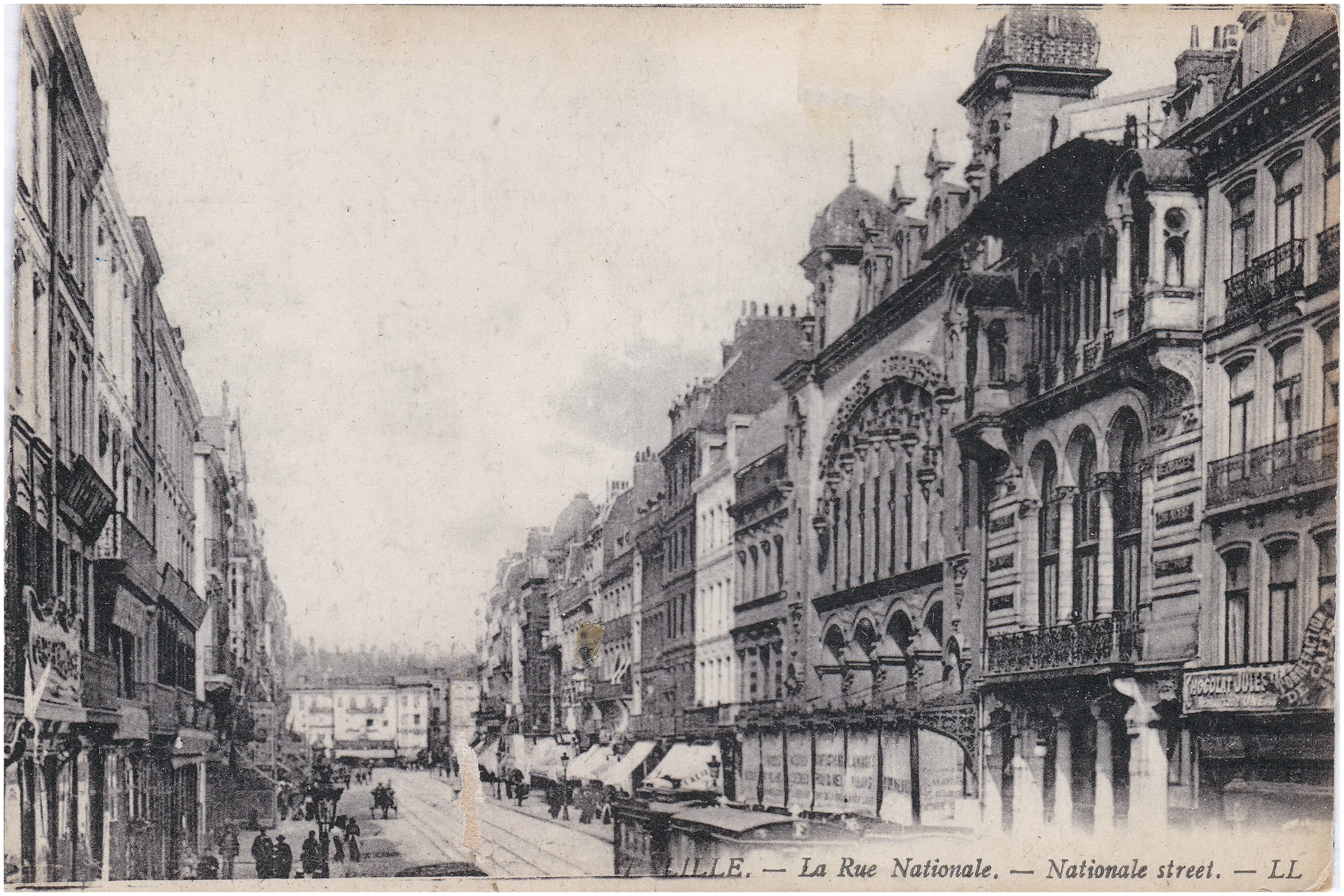
Lille around 1910

- 1906 - Population: 205,602.
- 1909 - Tramway begins operating.
- 1911 - Population: 217,807.
- 1913
  - Roman Catholic diocese of Lille established.
  - Opéra de Lille built.
- 1914 - German occupation begins (World War I).
- 1918 - October 17: City liberated by British.
- 1924 - Ecole Supérieure de Journalisme founded.
- 1925 - Roger Salengro elected mayor.
- 1932 - Hôtel de ville de Lille (City Hall) built.
- 1938 - City co-hosts the 1938 FIFA World Cup.
- 1940
  - May: Siege of Lille.
  - German occupation begins (see also: Lille during World War II).
  - August: Frontstalag 186 prisoner-of-war camp established by the Germans.
  - October: Frontstalag 102 prisoner-of-war camp established by the Germans.
  - December: Frontstalag 102 POW camp relocated to Amiens.
- 1941
  - March: Frontstalag 186 POW camp dissolved.
  - April: Echo du Nord begins publication.
- 1944
  - September - City liberated by Allied forces.
  - Lille Olympique Sporting Club formed.
- 1947 - Lille Airport in operation.
- 1948 - Jardin des Plantes de Lille established.

=== 1950s-1990s ===
- 1967 - Urban Community of Lille Métropole formed.
- 1968 - Lille courthouse built.
- 1970 - Lille 2 University of Health and Law and Jardin botanique de la Faculté de Pharmacie established.
- 1973 - Pierre Mauroy becomes mayor.
- 1976 - Orchestre national de Lille formed.
- 1977 - Hellemmes becomes an associated part of Lille.
- 1981 - City hosts the 1981 European Weightlifting Championships.

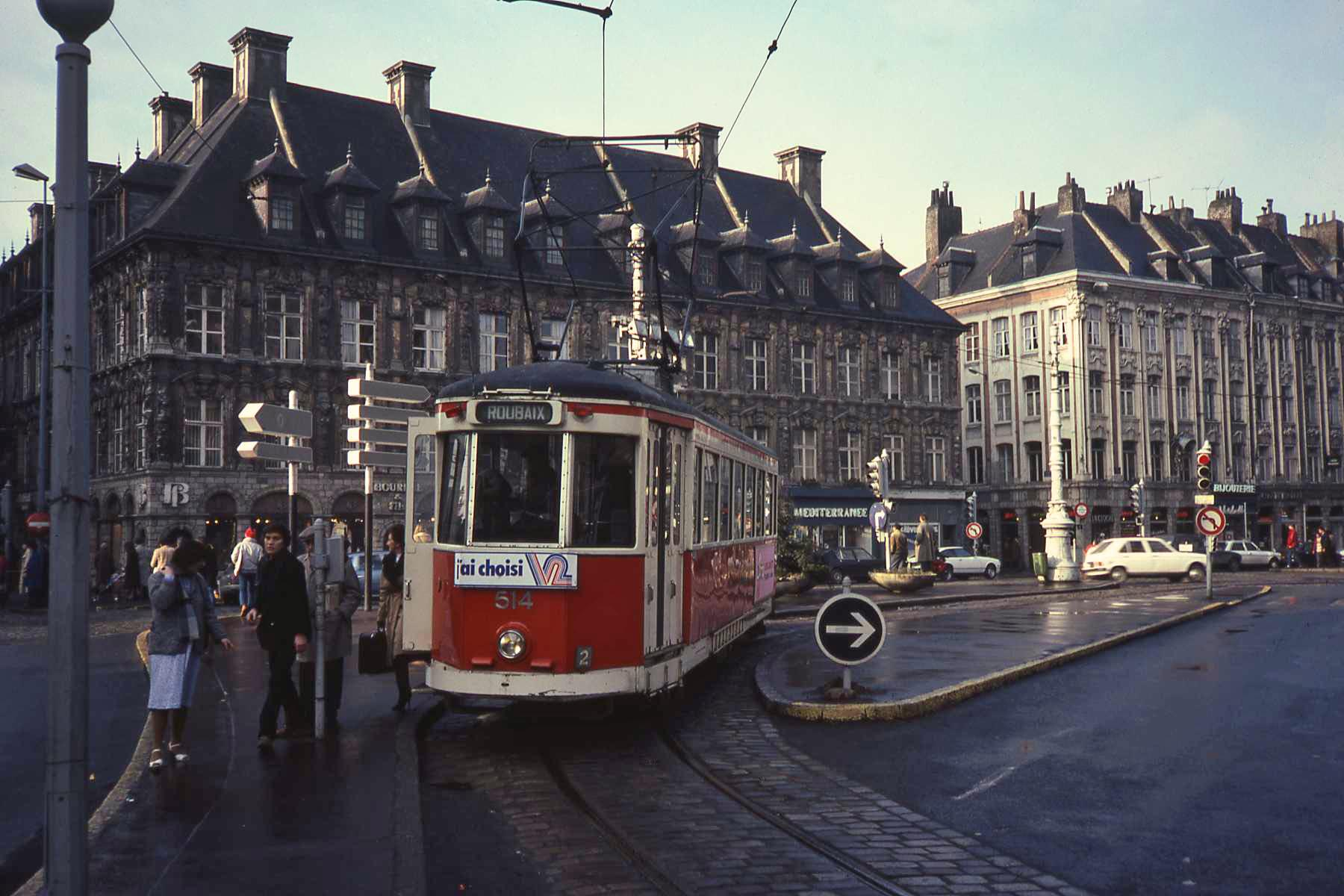
Lille in 1982

- 1983 - Lille Metro begins operating.
- 1984 - École de communication visuelle opens.
- 1987 - Socialist Party national congress held in Lille.
- 1986 - Lille Marathon begins.
- 1988 - Advanced European Institute of Management established.
- 1989 - Transpole formed.
- 1990 - École Nouvelle d'Ingénieurs en Communication founded.
- 1991 - Institut d'études politiques de Lille established.
- 1992 - Institut Lillois d'Ingénierie de la Santé founded.
- 1993
  - Paris-Lille TGV train begins operating.
  - Lille-Europe station built.
- 1994
  - Euralille (shopping mall) opens.
  - Eurostar train begins operating.
- 1999
  - Lille Cathedral built.
  - Population: 184,657.
- 2000 - Lomme becomes an associated part of Lille.

== 21st century ==
- 2001
  - March: Lille municipal election, 2001 held.
  - Martine Aubry becomes mayor.
- 2003 - Institut technologique européen d'entrepreneuriat et de management established.
- 2004 - Lille designated a European Capital of Culture.
- 2006 - Population: 226,014.
- 2009 - Université Lille Nord de France formed.
- 2011 - Population: 227,533.
- 2013 - City co-hosts the EuroBasket Women 2013.
- 2014 - March: Lille municipal election, 2014 held.
- 2015
  - September: City co-hosts the EuroBasket 2015.
  - December: 2015 Nord-Pas-de-Calais-Picardie regional election held.
- 2016 - Lille becomes part of the Hauts-de-France region.
- 2021 - The historic Saint-Joseph Chapel of Saint-Paul College is controversially demolished.

== See also ==
- Lille history
- History of Lille
- List of mayors of Lille
- List of heritage sites in Lille
- History of Nord-Pas-de-Calais region

Other cities in the Hauts-de-France region:

- Timeline of Amiens
- Timeline of Roubaix

== Bibliography ==
=== in English ===
- Clement Cruttwell (1793). "Lille". Gazetteer of France. London: G.G.J. and J. Robinson. hdl:2027/njp.32101072026816.
- C.B. Black (1876), "Lille", Guide to the North of France
- J.R. Somers Vine (1880), "Lille", Iron Roads Dictionary, London: Waterlow
- Augustus J.C. Hare (1890), "Lille", North-Eastern France, London: G. Allen, OCLC 1737047
- Norddeutscher Lloyd (1896), "Lille", Guide through Germany, Austria-Hungary, Italy, Switzerland, France, Belgium, Holland and England, Berlin: J. Reichmann & Cantor, OCLC 8395555
- "Lille", Northern France (3rd ed.), Leipsic: K. Baedeker, 1899, OCLC 2229516
- "Lille" . Encyclopædia Britannica. Vol. 16 (11th ed.). 1910. pp. 685–686.
- Lille before and during the war, Clermont-Ferrand, France: Michelin, 1919, OCLC 1843516, OL 6620039M
- Jean Caswell; Ivan Sipkov (1977). "Lille". Coutumes of France in the Library of Congress: an Annotated Bibliography. USA: Library of Congress. hdl:2027/mdp.39015034753866. ISBN 978-0-8444-0232-1.
- Colum Hourihane, ed. (2012). "Lille". Grove Encyclopedia of Medieval Art and Architecture. Oxford University Press. p. 67+. ISBN 978-0-19-539536-5.

=== in French ===
- Description des feux d'artifices faits a l'honneur du roy a Lille (in French), Lille: Jean Chrosostome Malte, 1680, OL 23293950M (fireworks); also via British Library
- "Lille". Almanach général des marchands, négocians, armateurs et fabricans (in French). Paris: L. Cellot. 1779. ISSN 1954-6521.
- "Nord: Lille". Annuaire des artistes français: Statistique des beaux-arts en France (in French). Paris: Guyot de Fère. 1833. ISSN 2275-6817.
- "Lille". Le Nord. Guides Joanne (in French). Hachette. 1899. hdl:2027/hvd.hn3f1z.
- "Lille". Le Nord. À la France: sites et monuments (in French). Paris: Touring-Club de France. 1906. OCLC 457600236.
