= Timeline of Amiens =

The following is a timeline of the history of the city of Amiens, France.

== Prior to 20th century ==
- 3rd century – Roman Catholic Diocese of Amiens established.
- 1117 – Charter of commune granted to Amiens by the bishop.
- 1185 – Amiens becomes part of the crown lands of France per Treaty of Boves.
- 1220 – Amiens Cathedral construction begins.
- 1390 – Public clock installed (approximate date).
- 1435 – Philip the Good of Burgundy in power per Congress of Arras.
- 1477 – Amiens again becomes part of the crown lands of France.
- 1496 – Amiens customary laws codified.
- 1550 – Hôtel de Ville construction begins.
- 1597 – Siege of Amiens (1597).
- 1750 – Amiens Academy of Sciences, Humanities and Arts founded.
- 1751 – Jardin des Plantes, Amiens (garden) created.
- 1760 – Hôtel de Ville completed.
- 1761 – Amiens Chamber of Commerce established.
- 1790 – Amiens becomes part of the Somme souveraineté.
- 1791 – Amiens Public Library founded.
- 1796 – Archives départementales de la Somme established in the Hôtel des Feuillants.
- 1800 – Population: 41,279.
- 1802
  - 25 March: International peace treaty signed in Amiens.
  - Picardy Museum founded.
- 1817 – Madeleine Cemetery, Amiens established.
- 1837 – Antiquarian Society established.
- 1848 – Longueau–Boulogne railway begins operating.
- 1849 – Statue of Du Cange erected in the Square Saint-Denis d'Amiens.
- 1863 – Saint-Acheul cemetery established.
- 1865 – Linnean Society of North-Picardy active.
- 1870 – November: Battle of Amiens (1870); Prussians in power.
- 1886 – Population: 80,288.
- 1889 – Cirque Jules-Verne (assembly hall) opens.
- 1891 – Amiens tramway begins operating.

== 20th century ==
- 1901 – Amiens Sporting Club formed.
- 1902 – Devred shop in business.
- 1911 – Population: 93,207.
- 1913 – French Grand Prix automotive race held in Amiens.
- 1914 – City "taken and lost by Germans."
- 1918 – August: Battle of Amiens (1918) fought near city.
- 1940 – May–June: Battle of Amiens (1940).
- 1944 – Le Courrier picard newspaper begins publication.
- 1946 - Amiens trolleybus begins operating.
- 1952 - Amiens Zoo established.
- 1954 – Tour Perret (Amiens) hi-rise built.
- 1958 – Gare d'Amiens rebuilt.
- 1960 – Amiens twinned with Dortmund, Germany.
- 1962 – Population: 105,433.
- 1966 – Maison de la culture d'Amiens inaugurated.
- 1970 – University of Picardie Jules Verne established.
- 1971 - Amiens twinned with Görlitz, Germany.
- 1973 - Amiens twinned with Darlington, United Kingdom.
- 1981 – Amiens Conservatory active.
- 1999
  - Stade de la Licorne (stadium) opens.
  - Fakir newspaper begins publication.
  - Population: 135,501.
- 2000 – Communauté d'agglomération Amiens Métropole created.

== 21st century ==
- 2006 – Amiens twinned with Tulsa, USA.
- 2011 – Population: 133,327.
- 2012 – August: Youth unrest.
- 2014
  - January: Labour unrest at Goodyear factory.
  - March: Amiens municipal election, 2014 held.
  - Brigitte Fouré becomes mayor.
- 2015 – December: 2015 Nord-Pas-de-Calais-Picardie regional election held.
- 2016 – Amiens becomes part of the Hauts-de-France region.

== See also ==
- History of Amiens
- List of mayors of Amiens
- List of bishops of Amiens
- List of heritage sites in Amiens
- History of the Somme department
- History of Picardy region

Other cities in the Hauts-de-France region:

- Timeline of Lille
- Timeline of Roubaix

== Bibliography ==
=== in English ===
- Clement Cruttwell (1793). "Amiens". Gazetteer of France. London: G.G.J. and J. Robinson. hdl:2027/njp.32101072026808.
- Abraham Rees (1819), "Amiens", The Cyclopaedia, London: Longman, Hurst, Rees, Orme & Brown, hdl:2027/mdp.39015012312156
- "Amiens", Handbook for Travellers in France (8th ed.), London: J. Murray, 1861
- "Amiens", Northern France (3rd ed.), Leipsic: Karl Baedeker, 1899, OCLC 2229516
- "Amiens". Chambers's Encyclopaedia. London. 1901. hdl:2027/njp.32101065312868.
- "Amiens" . Encyclopædia Britannica. Vol. 1 (11th ed.). 1910. pp. 855–856.
- Benjamin Vincent (1910), "Amiens", Haydn's Dictionary of Dates (25th ed.), London: Ward, Lock & Co., hdl:2027/loc.ark:/13960/t89g6g776
- Amiens Before and During the War, Clermont-Ferrand: Michelin, 1919, OCLC 887914, OL 13521961M
- Jean Caswell; Ivan Sipkov (1977). "Amiens". Coutumes of France in the Library of Congress: an Annotated Bibliography. USA: Library of Congress. hdl:2027/mdp.39015034753866. ISBN 978-0-8444-0232-1.
- Colum Hourihane, ed. (2012). "Amiens". Grove Encyclopedia of Medieval Art and Architecture. Oxford University Press. ISBN 978-0-19-539536-5.

=== in French ===
- "Amiens". Dictionnaire géographique portatif de la France (in French). Paris: Desaint. 1765.
- Hyacinthe Dusevel (1848). Histoire de la ville d'Amiens (2nd ed.). Caron et Lambert.
- Eusèbe Girault de Saint-Fargeau [in French] (1850). "Amiens". Guide pittoresque: portatif et complet, du voyageur en France (in French) (3rd ed.). Paris: Firmin Didot frères. p. 259. hdl:2027/uiug.30112081968700.
- Ch. Brossard (1900). "Picardie: Somme: Description des villes: Amiens". La France du Nord. Géographie pittoresque et monumentale de la France (in French). Flammarion. hdl:2027/nyp.33433066581111. (Table of contents)
- Albéric de Calonne (1906). Histoire de la ville d'Amiens (in French). Amiens: Piteux Frères.
- "Amiens". Le Nord. À la France: sites et monuments (in French). Paris: Touring-Club de France. 1906. OCLC 457600236.
- "Amiens". Dictionnaire Bouillet (in French) (34th ed.). Hachette. 1914. hdl:2027/mdp.39015074817142.
