= Timeline of Roubaix =

The following is a timeline of the history of the city of Roubaix, France.

== Prior to 20th century ==
- 1469 – Factory franchise granted by Charles the Bold.
- 1790 – Roubaix becomes part of the Nord souveraineté.
- 1793 – Population: 9,120.
- 1843 – Motte-Bossut textile mill built near the Canal de Roubaix.
- 1846 - Population: 31,039.
- 1848 - Saint Martin Church, Roubaix remodelled.
- 1866 – Population: 65,091.
- 1867 – Canton of Roubaix-Est and Canton de Roubaix-Ouest created.
- 1868 – Société d'émulation de Roubaix founded.
- 1872 – Chamber of Commerce established.
- 1876 - Population: 83,000.
- 1878 – Saint Joseph Church, Roubaix and Hôtel Prouvost (mansion) built.
- 1880 – Hôtel Auguste-Lepoutre (mansion) built.
- 1883 - National school of industrial arts founded.
- 1886 – Population: 100,299.
- 1888 – Gare de Roubaix (rail station) built.
- 1889 – École nationale supérieure des arts et industries textiles (school) established.
- 1891 – Chambre syndicale métallurgique de Roubaix established.
- 1892 – Canton de Roubaix-Nord created.
- 1894 – Compagnie des tramways de Roubaix et de Tourcoing established.
- 1895 – RC Roubaix football club formed.
- 1896
  - Paris–Roubaix bicycle race begins.
  - Population: 124,661.

== 20th century ==
- 1906 - Population: 110,055.
- 1909 – Line R, Lille-Roubaix-Tourcoing tramway begins operating.
- 1911
  - Hôtel de Ville (City Hall) built.
  - Population: 122,723.
- 1920 – GBM brewery in business.
- 1928 – Excelsior AC Roubaix football club formed.
- 1967 – Lille Métropole Communauté urbaine established.
- 1968 – Population: 114,547.
- 1969 – 1969 Tour de France cycling race departs from Roubaix.
- 1982
  - Motte-Bossut factory closes.
  - Canton de Roubaix-Centre created.
- 1983
  - Ballet du Nord founded.
  - André Diligent becomes mayor.
- 1993
  - Cave aux Poètes performance space opens.
  - Camaïeu (company) headquartered in Roubaix.
- 1994 – René Vandierendonck becomes mayor.
- 1996
  - March: Police raid house of criminal Gang de Roubaix.
  - Part of city designated an "urban tax-free zone."
- 1999
  - Alsace (Lille Metro), Gare – Jean-Lebas (Lille Metro), Roubaix-Charles de Gaulle (Lille Metro), and Roubaix-Grand Place (Lille Metro) stations open.
  - Kimberly-Clark factory built.
  - Population: 96,984.
- 2000 – La Piscine Museum opens.

== 21st century ==
- 2001 – "Politique de la ville" housing program implemented.
- 2008 – Bibliothèque numérique de Roubaix website published.
- 2011 – Population: 94,186.
- 2012
  - Bilal Mosque built.
  - Pierre Dubois (politician) becomes mayor.
- 2014
  - March: Nord municipal election, 2014 held.
  - Abou Bakr Mosque opens.
  - Guillaume Delbar becomes mayor.
- 2015
  - 24 November: 2015 Roubaix shootings occur.
  - December: 2015 Nord-Pas-de-Calais-Picardie regional election held.
- 2016 – Roubaix becomes part of the Hauts-de-France region.

== See also ==
- History of Roubaix
- List of mayors of Roubaix
- List of heritage sites in Roubaix
- History of Nord-Pas-de-Calais region

Other cities in the Hauts-de-France region:

- Timeline of Amiens
- Timeline of Lille

== Bibliography ==
=== in English ===
- "Roubaix", Northern France (4th ed.), Leipzig: Karl Baedeker, 1905, hdl:2027/mdp.39015063869328, OCLC 01820283
- "Roubaix" . Encyclopædia Britannica. Vol. 23 (11th ed.). 1910. p. 767.
- Romain Garbaye (2008). "Roubaix, 1980s-2001". Getting Into Local Power: The Politics of Ethnic Minorities in British and French Cities. Blackwell. ISBN 978-1-4051-4820-7.
- Claire Colomb (2011). "Culture in the city, culture for the city? The political construction of the trickle-down in cultural regeneration strategies in Roubaix, France". Town Planning Review. 82 (1).
- Yoan Miot (2012). "Housing strategies for a shrinking French city: the case of Roubaix (France)". In Martinez-Fernandez; et al. (eds.). Demographic Change and Local Development: Shrinkage, Regeneration and Social Dynamics. Organisation for Economic Co-operation and Development. ISBN 978-92-64-18046-8.

=== in French ===
- "Roubaix". Le Nord. Guides Joanne (in French). Hachette. 1899. hdl:2027/hvd.hn3f1z.
- Ministère du Commerce (1903). "Nord: Roubaix". Annuaire des syndicats professionels, industriels, commerciaux et agricoles (in French). Paris: Imprimerie nationale.
- "Roubaix". Dictionnaire Bouillet (in French) (34th ed.). Hachette. 1914. hdl:2027/mdp.39015074817142.
- Roubaix-Tourcoing et les villes lainières d'Europe: découverte d'un patrimoine industriel (in French). Presses Universitaires du Septentrion. 2005. ISBN 978-2-85939-918-4.
- Michel David; et al., eds. (January 2006). Roubaix: cinquante ans de transformations urbaines et de mutations sociales (in French). Presses Universitaires du Septentrion. ISBN 978-2-85939-926-9.
- Chantal Petillon (2006). La population de Roubaix: industrialisation, démographie et société 1750-1880 (in French). Presses Universitaires du Septentrion. ISBN 978-2-85939-917-7.
