= History of Amiens =

Amiens (French pronunciation: [a.mjɛ̃]) is a city and commune in northern France, 120 km (75 mi) north of Paris and 100 km (62 mi) south-west of Lille. It is the capital of the Somme department in Nord-Pas-de-Calais-Picardie. The city had a population of 136,105 according to the 2006 census.

The first known settlement was Samarobriva ("Somme bridge"), the central settlement of the Ambiani, one of the principal tribes of Gaul. The town was given the name Ambianum by the Romans, meaning settlement of the Ambiani people. The town has been much fought over, being attacked by barbarian tribes, and later by the Normans. In 1113 the city was recognized by King Louis VI of France, and joined to the Crown of France in 1185. In 1597, Spanish soldiers held the city during the six-month Siege of Amiens, before Henry IV regained control. During the 18th and 19th century, the textile tradition of Amiens became famous for its velours. In 1789 the provinces of France were dismantled and the territory was organised into departments. Much of Picardy became the newly created department of Somme, with Amiens as the departmental capital. During the Industrial Revolution the city walls were demolished, opening up space for large boulevards around the town centre. The Henriville neighbourhood in the south of the city was developed around this time. In 1848, the first railway arrived in Amiens, linking the city to Boulogne-sur-Mer. During the 1870 Battle of Amiens, when the Somme was invaded by Prussian forces, Amiens was occupied.

The town was fought over during both the First and Second World Wars, suffering much damage, and being occupied several times by both sides. The 1918 Battle of Amiens, was the opening phase of the Hundred Days Offensive, which led directly to the Armistice with Germany that ended the war. It was heavily bombed by the Royal Air Force during the Second World War. The city was rebuilt according to Pierre Dufau's plans, with a focus on widening the streets to ease traffic congestion. These newer structures were primarily built of brick, concrete and white stone with slate roofs. The architect Auguste Perret designed the Gare d'Amiens train station and nearby Tour Perret.

== Prehistory ==
=== Paleolithic ===
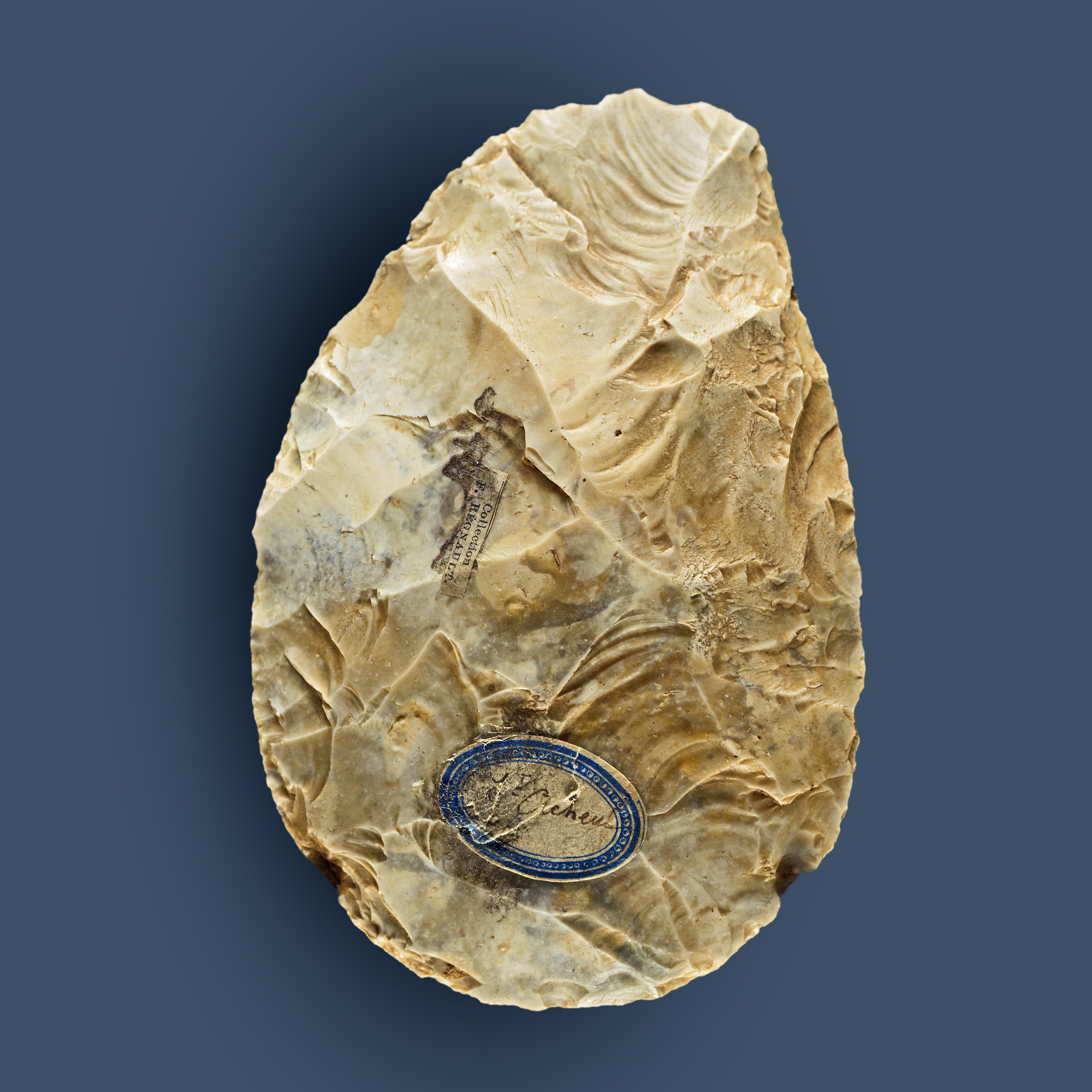
The Saint-Acheul axehead (Félix Régnault collection

The discovery of important prehistoric sites in Amiens contributed to the birth and growth of prehistory, a young science which established itself in the second half of the 19th century. The region of Amiens has enormous potential for Quaternary geology and, more generally, for knowledge of the history of the first settlements in Europe.

The wealth and importance of the deposits in the suburbs of Saint-Acheul and Montieres, as well as the quality of the work of Victor Commont and Jacques Boucher de Perthes, considered the founder of prehistory, brought an international scientific reputation to the territory. As the Vézère Valley and the Dordogne, the Somme Valley made reference to prehistory and to the study of the Paleolithic.

It was at Amiens that, for the first time, was defined one of the most ancient civilisations of humanity: The Acheulean. In 1853, haches taillées [carved axes], according to the term of the time, were collected in the old alluvium of the Somme at the level of the suburb of Saint-Acheul, east of the city. This discovery fascinated the greatest international experts of the time, Joseph Prestwich, Hugh Falconer, Charles Lyell and John Evans, who flocked to the site. In August 1859, Albert Gaudry discovered nine "carved axes" attesting, according to him, of the great antiquity of mankind. These discoveries marked the beginning of the great period of Saint-Acheul which lasted more than three-quarters of a century.

Between 1860 and 1880, 20,000 axeheads were thus collected. Saint-Acheul, whose fame became international, attracted many French and foreign specialists and collectors. This success gave rise to a lucrative trade of fake flints.

In 1872, Gabriel de Mortillet, who named the great periods of prehistory in France, decided to name the stone tools gathered in large numbers at Saint-Acheul as Acheulean. The Amiens site then became the reference for the main features of the lower Palaeolithic.

Today, the Saint-Acheul archaeological garden is open to the public and presents a landscape of the former quarries which were classified as Historic Monuments in 1947.

In 2007, archaeological excavations, at the Rue du Manège, uncovered the earliest traces of human occupation in Amiens, in an alluvial aquifer perched at 35 metres (115 ft) above the bottom of the current valley. The age of the remains collected during this intervention is dated to approximately 500,000 to 550,000 years ago.

=== Mesolithic ===
In 2006, when housing was under construction, excavations revealed Mesolithic (Note: Mesolithic going from 9600 to 5500 BCE.) sites on positions of ancient banks of the Somme and the Selle.

=== Neolithic ===
The Neolithic period the territory of Amiens has not been the subject of intensive research as the Paleolithic. However, a large deposit in the Montieres-Etouvie sector has delivered an extensive Neolithic industry with yellow flint of excellent craftsmanship.

Renancourt brickworks also updated important remains attributable to the Neolithic or Chalcolithic, evidenced by the boat-shaped double axe exhibited at the Musée de Picardie.

== Antiquity ==
The first known settlement is Samarobriva ("Somme bridge"), mentioned for the first time in the Commentarii de Bello Gallico of Julius Caesar. Some forty years later, it was the central settlement of the Ambiani, one of the principal tribes of Gaul, who were issuing coinage, probably from Amiens, in the 1st century BC. It was a large town which controlled the passage of the Via Agrippa connecting Lyon to Boulogne-sur-Mer. The Ambiani derived their name from the Gaulish word ambe, meaning river – a reference to the Somme that flows through Amiens. The town was given the name Ambianum by the Romans, meaning settlement of the Ambiani people.

Excavations near the city hall and the Palace of Justice revealed the foundations of the forum, the thermal baths and amphitheatre built for a population greater than that of either Londinium or Lutetia. After Nero's death, it was a centre of equipment of Britannia and saw a flow of legionaries and merchants. The enclosure of the late Empire protected an area of 20 hectares (49 acres). During the development of the ZAC de Renancourt in 2012, archaeologists (INRAP and Drac Picardie) excavated a Gallo-Roman rural area of 10 hectares (25 acres), from after the conquest (1st and 2nd centuries). The occupation of the 1st century discovered (La Tène culture).

== Late antiquity ==
Samarobriu (Samarobriva Ambianorum) appears on the Tabula Peutingeriana.

In 367, Valentinian I moved to Amiens to organise a maritime defence system, known as the Tractus Armoricanus et Nervicanus. Valentinian I proclaimed his son Gratian his co-augustus at Amiens the same year, after recovering from an illness. In 367, it was from Amiens that Count Theodosius defeated the Franks, Scots, and Saxons to restore order in Roman Britain following the Great Conspiracy. In 383, in contrast, Amiens, like all towns in the area, was taken by Magnus Maximus, proclaimed emperor by the legions in Britain.

In 2006, during the construction of buildings in the Cathedral ZAC, excavations were used to study a portion of the wall erected at the end of the 3rd century in Samarobriva. During the late Roman Empire, the walled city was one of the main rear Roman bases facing the Barbarian Invasions. The prosperity of the city made it a target for barbarian tribes such as the Alans, the Burgundians or the Vandals, who attacked the city several times.

By tradition, it was at the gates of Amiens that Saint Martin of Tours, at the time still a Roman soldier, shared his cloak with a naked beggar.

During the 5th century, Chlodio rose to power among the Franks, and Merovech was elected in Amiens by his comrades in arms. The saint Honoratus of Amiens (French: Honoré, lit. 'Honorius') was the seventh bishop of the city and died in 600.

== Middle Ages ==
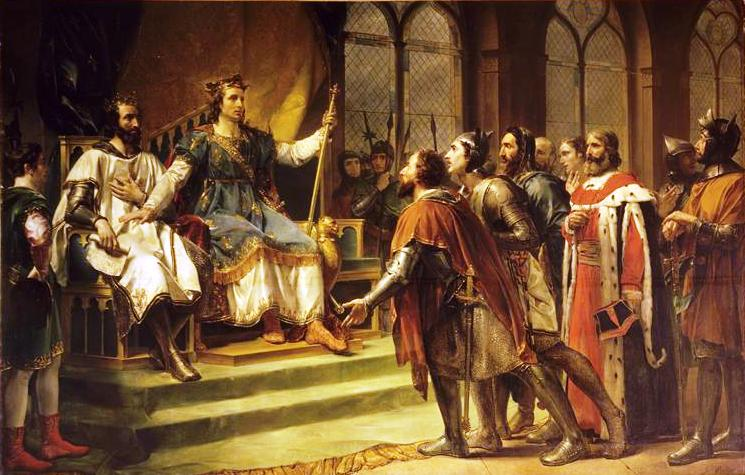
Saint Louis Mediating Between the King of England and His Barons by Georges Rouget, 1820

Normans sacked the city 859 and again in 882. During the second sacking, the city's cathedral was burned. During the early part of the 10th century, Count Herbert de Vermandois united the regions of Amiens, Vexin, Laon, and Reims. In 1095, the people of Amiens began to form a rough municipal organization. In 1113, the municipality was sworn with the agreement of the Bishop and subsequently recognised by the King of France. Other cities in the region (Beauvais, Cambrai, Laon, Noyon, Saint-Quentin) moved up in the field of municipal liberties. On Palm Sunday 1115, King Louis VI was present in Amiens, to support Bishop Geoffroi and the residents against the Count Enguerrand de Coucy who refused to recognise the communal institution. The city was joined to the Crown of France in 1185.

In 1218, lightning destroyed the archives of the bishopric and chapter, and destroyed the cathedral which had been rebuilt after the invasion of the Normans. In 1264, Amiens was chosen as the seat of arbitrations when King Louis IX of France settled the conflict between King Henry III of England and his rebellious barons, led by Simon de Montfort. The arbitrations led to Louis deciding on the Mise of Amiens – a one-sided settlement in favour of Henry. This decision almost immediately led to the outbreak of the Barons' War.

The blue of Amiens produced from woad (Isatis tinctoria) known as the Pastel des teinturiers et de waide [Pastel of dyers and of woad] in Picard, a dye plant, made the fortune of merchant woad producers, and the city, in the 12th and 13th centuries. The wealth generated by the proceeds from the sale of this dye contributed to the financing of the reconstruction of the cathedral. Today, the heritage, cultural and economic exploitation of woad is still topical. Amiens is indeed the leader of the European cooperation project "beyond the blue - Woad: heritage and creation".

In 1435 the city was among the possessions granted to Philip the Good of Burgundy by the Congress of Arras. It was re-acquired again by King Louis XI in 1477 after the death of Charles the Bold. Louis XI authorised two annual fairs in Amiens, by its letters patent, so that not only the city gains but that it does not now encourage the flight of currency from the kingdom, due to the powerful fairs of Antwerp and Bruges.

== Early Modern era ==
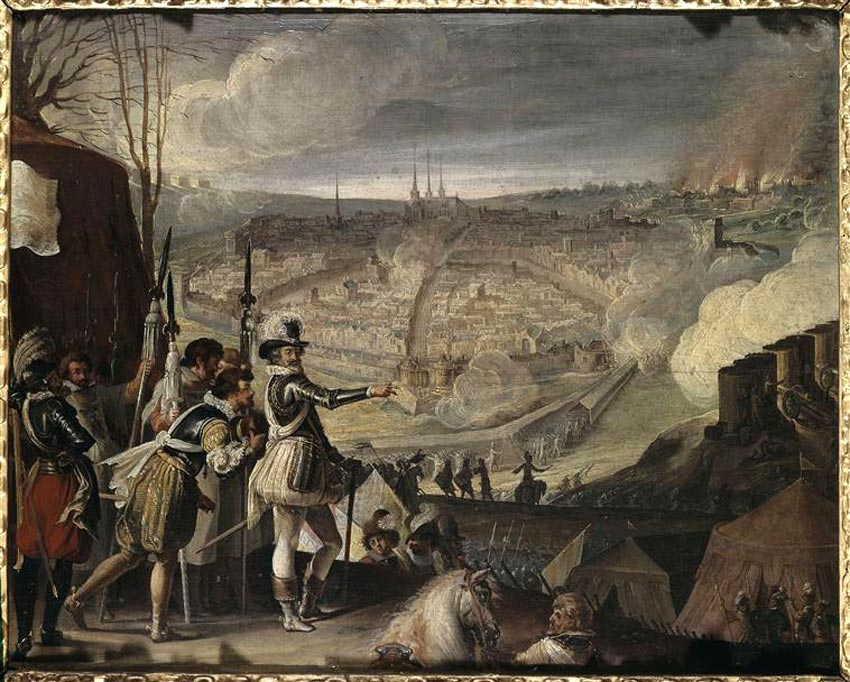
Henry IV at the Siege of Amiens (Anonymous, Museum of Versailles)

On 11 March 1597, the Spanish attacked by surprise. The soldiers of Count Pedro Henriquez de Acevedo of Fuentes, disguised as peasants came before the gates of the walls with walnuts and apples. The hungry people of Amiens then opened the gates and the Spaniards entered and took over the city. The six month siege of Amiens by Henry IV with the assistance of English troops sent by Elizabeth I subsequently took place. A large Spanish relief force was defeated in September following which the Spanish garrison surrendered. The victory led to the Edict of Nantes and the Peace of Vervins the following year. Henry took over the city, putting an end to its autonomous rule.

During the 18th and 19th century, the textile tradition of Amiens became famous for its velours. The Cosserat family rose to prominence as one of the wealthiest of Amiens' textile manufacturing families. In 1789 the provinces of France were dismantled and the territory was organised into departments. Much of Picardy became the newly created department of Somme, with Amiens as the departmental capital.

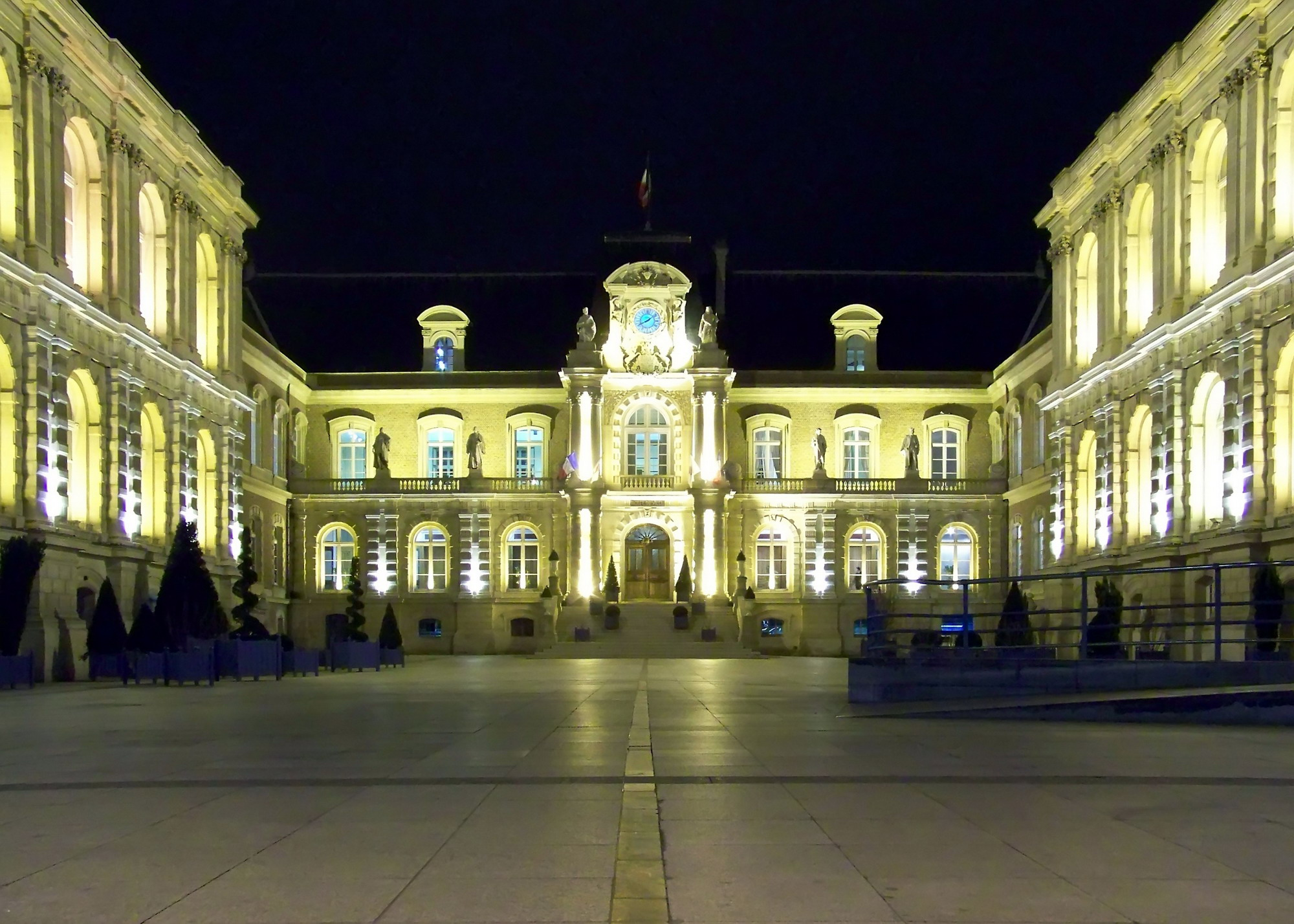
Amiens' 18th-century City Hall

== 19th century ==
In November 1801, British and French delegates began discussing terms of peace at the Amiens Congress. On 25 March 1802, the United Kingdom of Great Britain and Ireland and the French First Republic signed the Treaty of Amiens at the town hall, putting an end to the Second Coalition against France.

During the 19th century, Amiens began to feel the effects of the Industrial Revolution, and became known worldwide thanks to the quality of its textile production. The city walls were demolished, opening up space for large boulevards around the town centre. The Henriville quarter in the south of the city was developed around this time, on the plots of the hospices of Amiens, far from the suburbs of Saint-Honore and Saint-Acheul. The Rue de la République was created and became a street of power and knowledge, with the erection of the municipal library and the Picardie Museum, as well as the installation of the prefecture.

In 1849, as in all the communes in France, the adult male population could, for the first time, vote through the introduction of universal suffrage. The city was hit by an outbreak of cholera in 1866.

The first railway through Amiens was built in 1846, with the first station, known as Gare du Nord: It allowed the city to connect to Paris. (Note: This is the current Paris–Lille railway, which hasn't passed through the station of Amiens since March 1849, the month a direct connection to Longueau was commissioned.) A second line opened from 1847 to Boulogne-sur-Mer, (Note: This is the current Longueau–Boulogne railway.) with Gare Saint-Roch; then, in 1874, the Amiens locomotive depot was put into service. Some old ditches, adjacent to the city walls, were used for the passage of railway routes. This progress changed the geography of the city, which now turned away from the Somme, like the city hall which moved its entrance from the Place au fil, to the current Rue des Trois-Cailloux.

After this time, the city began to grow beyond the river and into the surrounding hills. During the 1870 Franco-Prussian War, Somme was invaded by Prussian forces and Amiens was occupied.

Early science fiction author Jules Verne took up residence in Amiens in 1871, having met his wife there at a wedding in 1856. He was later elected city councilman in 1888. In 1889, Jules Verne presided over the opening of the Amiens circus, including a courthouse, a police station and a museum dedicated to the history of Picardy.

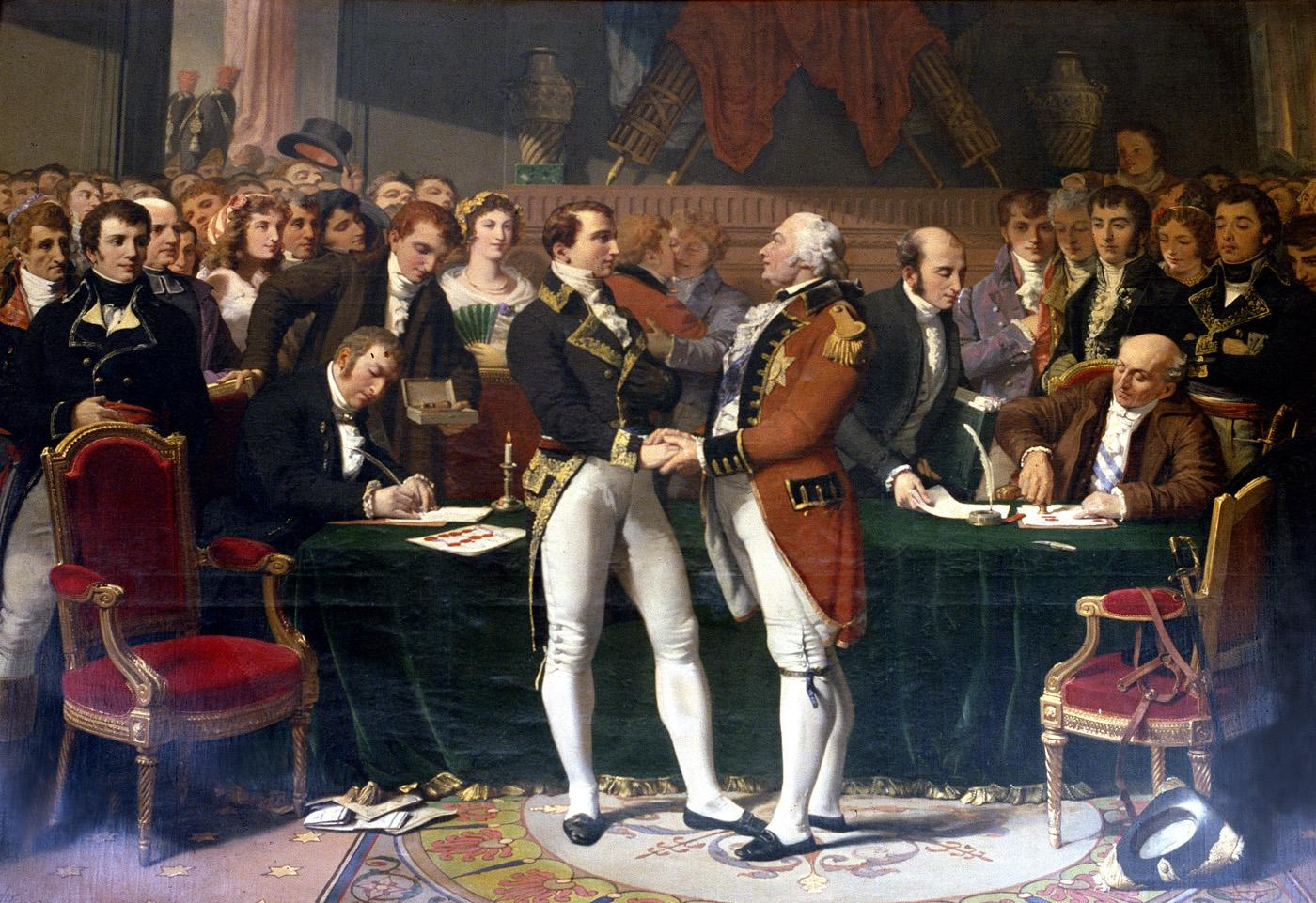
The Peace of Amiens by Jules-Claude Ziegler (1853).

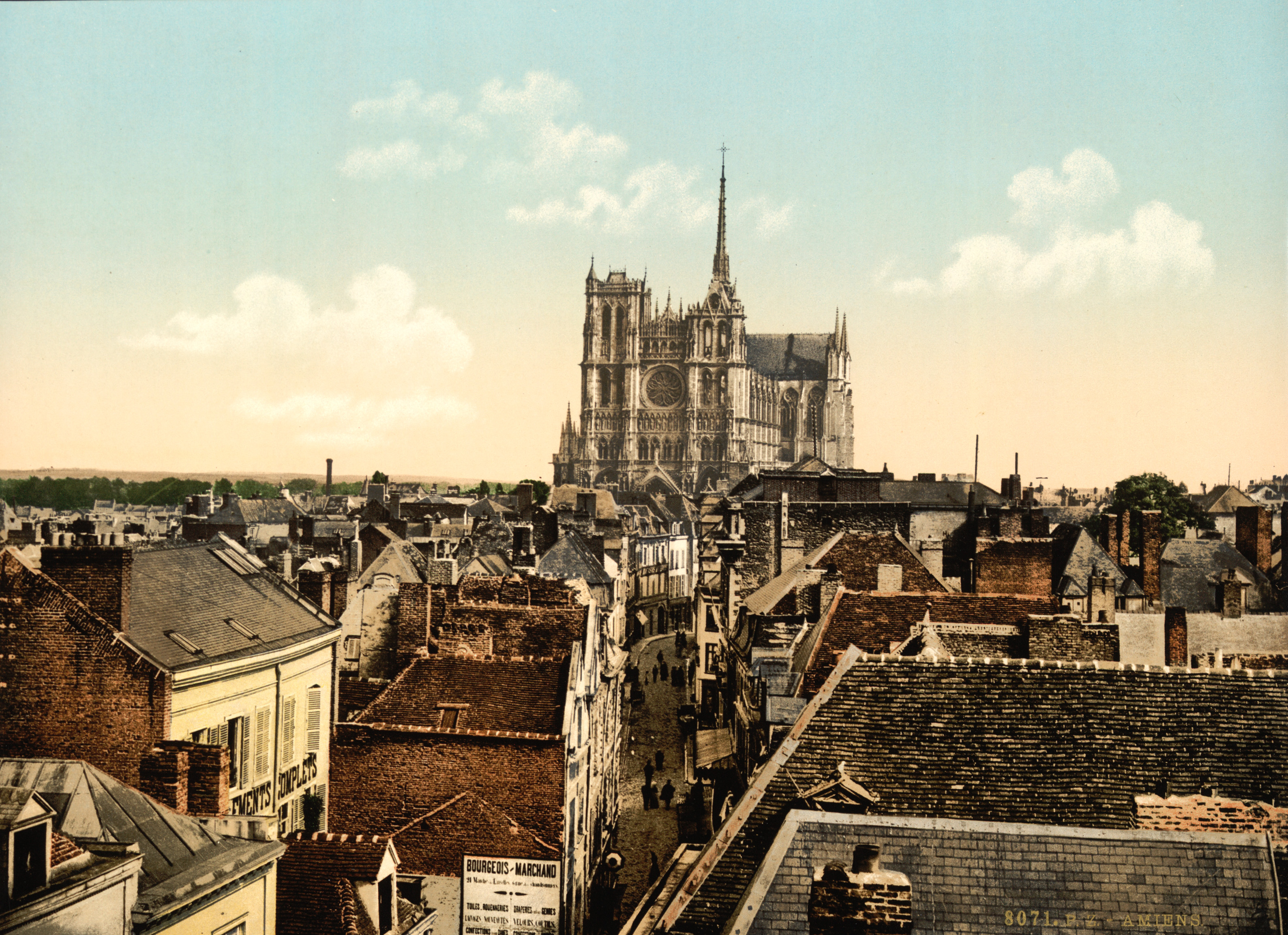
A view of the cathedral from the belfry in 1895.

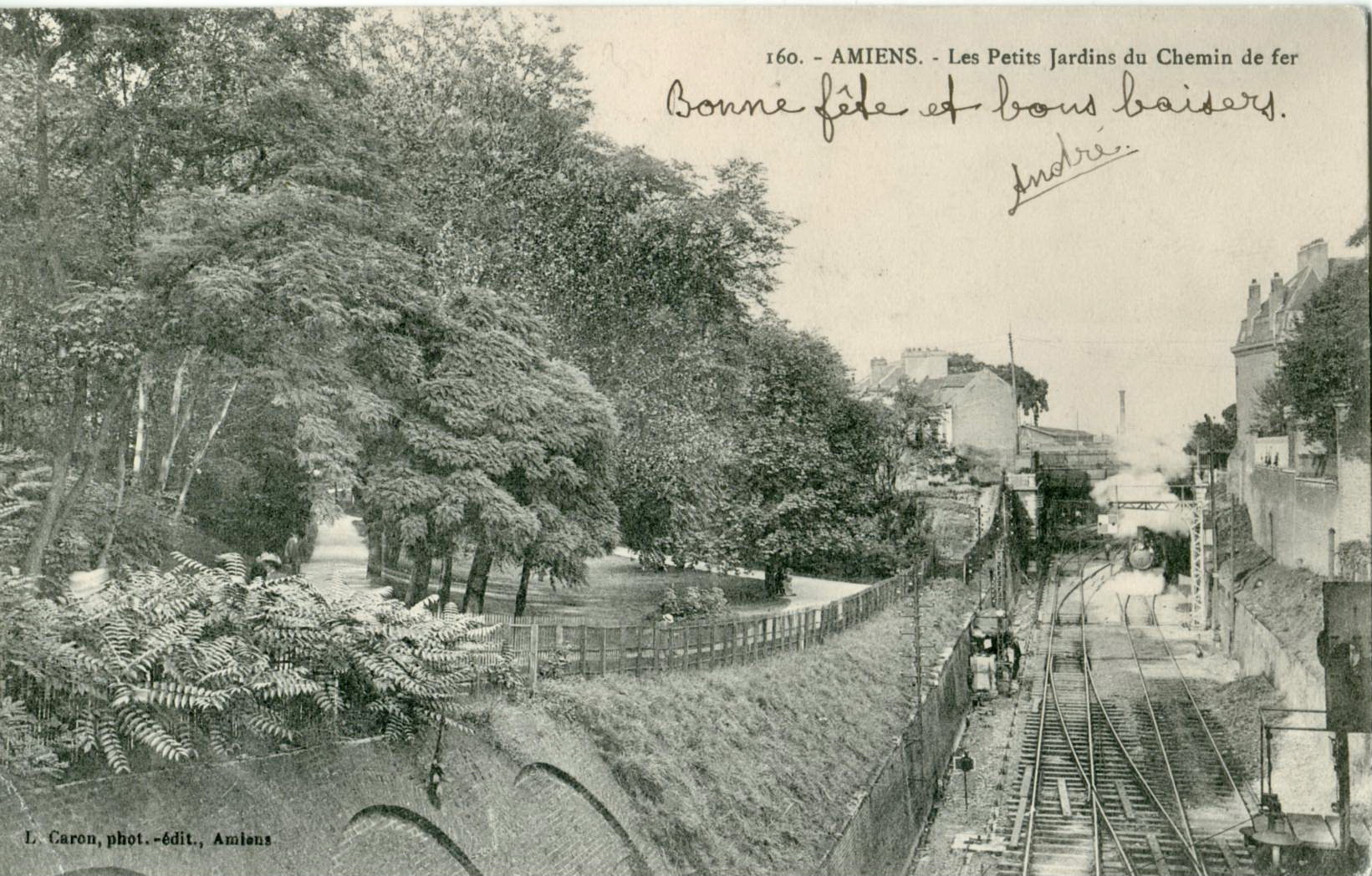
In the 19th century, the railway occupies the site of the ancient walls of Philippe Auguste.

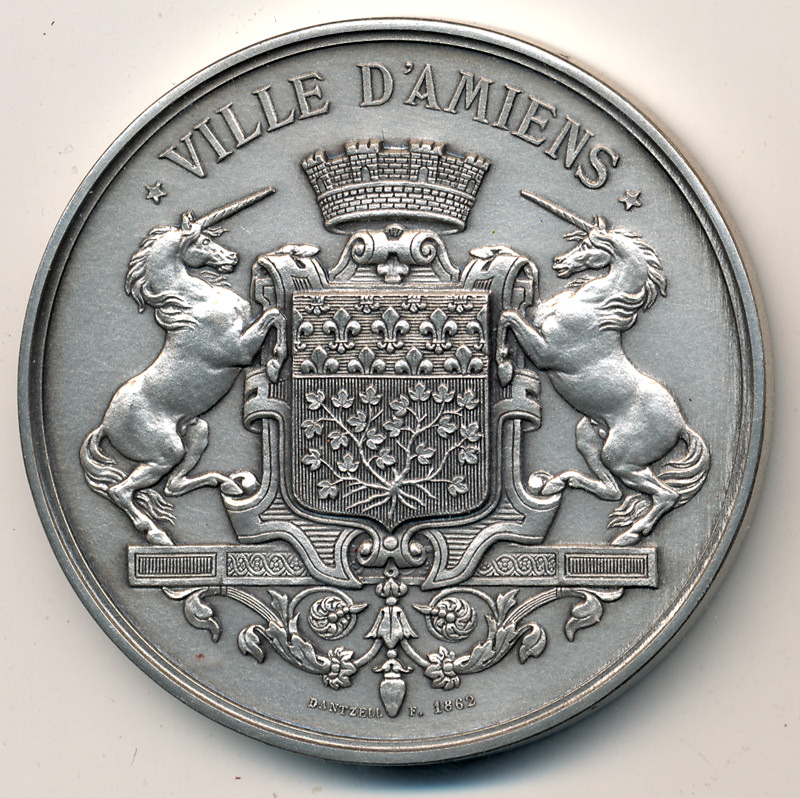
Medal of the city with its blazon, 53 millimetres (2.1 in), signed Dantzell 1862.

In 1891, the network of the former tramway of Amiens was created, originally horse-drawn, and then, from 1899, with electric traction. This network operated until its destruction during the Battle of France in 1940.

In 1894, the anarchists in the area were targeted during the repression of January and February 1894.

== 20th and 21st centuries ==
=== From the Belle Epoque to the First World War ===
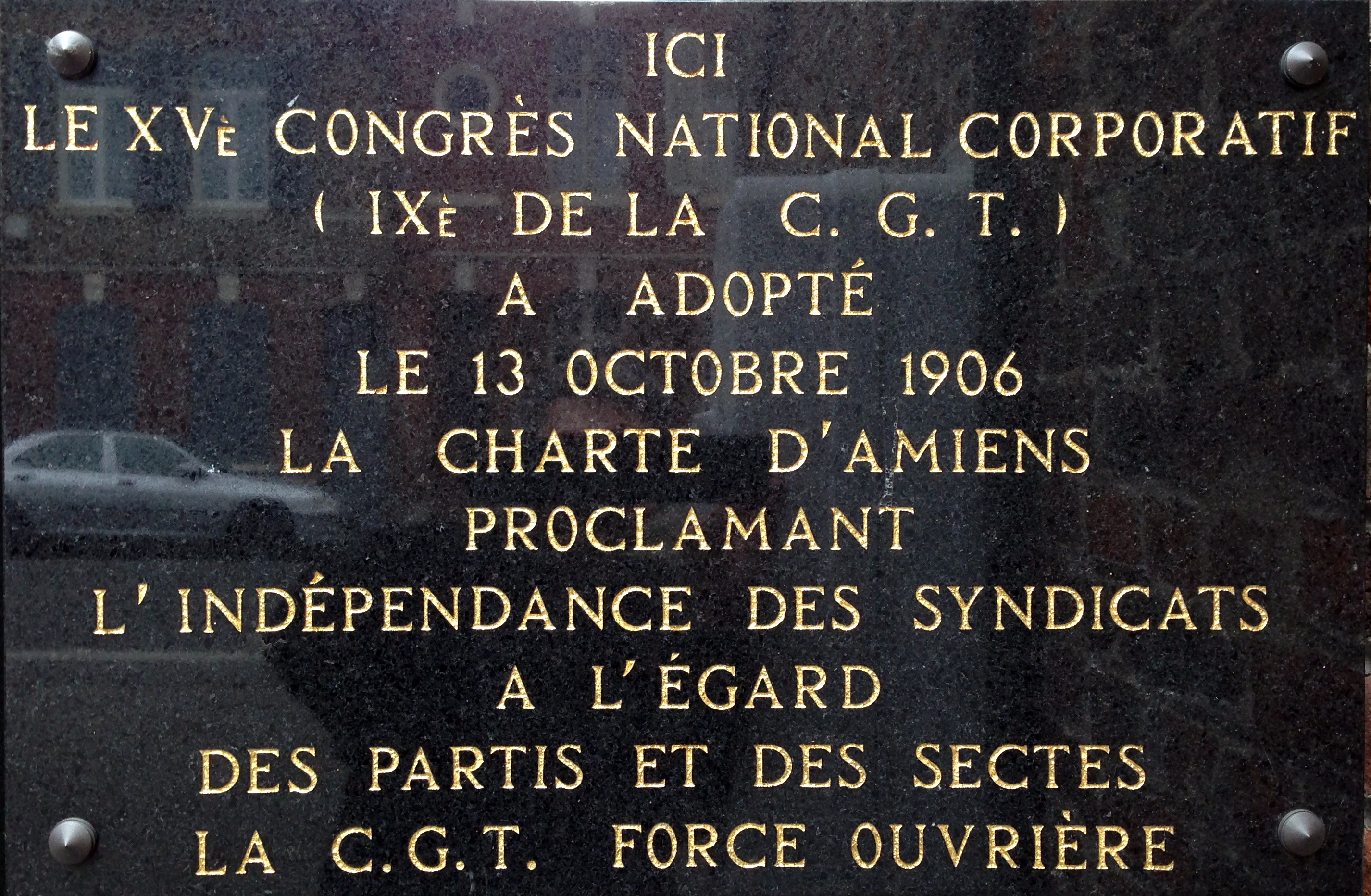
Plaque of the Charter of Amiens at the entrance of the Noyon primary school, Rue Rigollot.

The tenth French town at the beginning of the 20th century, its population doubled between 1800 and 1900 from 41,000 to more than 90,000 inhabitants. Given the need to accommodate the newcomers, the city transformed and enriched its heritage, especially valuing its centre, while retaining traces of its past with its plan leaving the imprint of the successive walls. The city extended first south and then north, especially in the Saint-Pierre quarter where many "Jacobins" houses were built.

The Nouvelles Galeries, which opened their doors in 1895 on the Rue des Trois-Cailloux, competed with small trade. In 1902, Henri Devred installed his first ready-to-wear store in this iconic shopping street.

Beginning in 1905, Victor Commont, called "the founding father of modern Prehistoric science," performed important archaeological work in the Picardy area.

In 1906, the CGT held an historic congress which developed the Charter of Amiens, signed on 13 October 1906, a constitution of French syndicalism defining its independence from political parties.

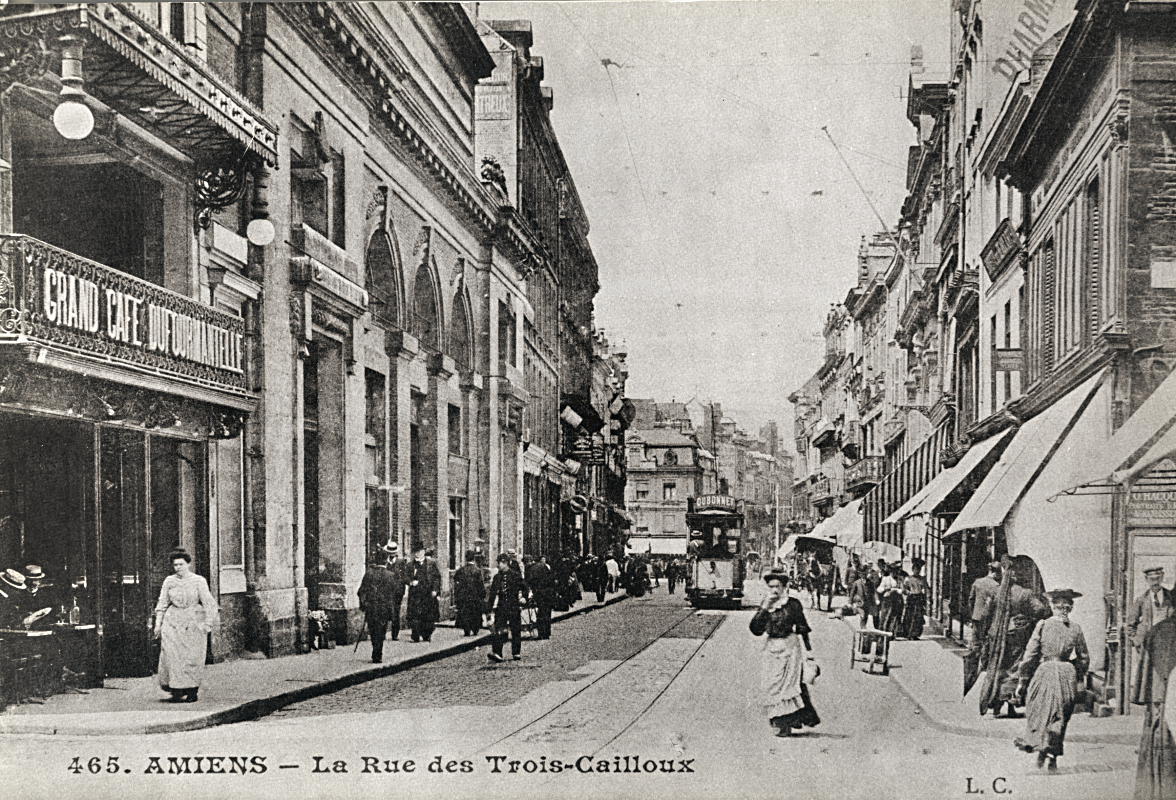
The Rue des Trois-Cailloux in 1907.

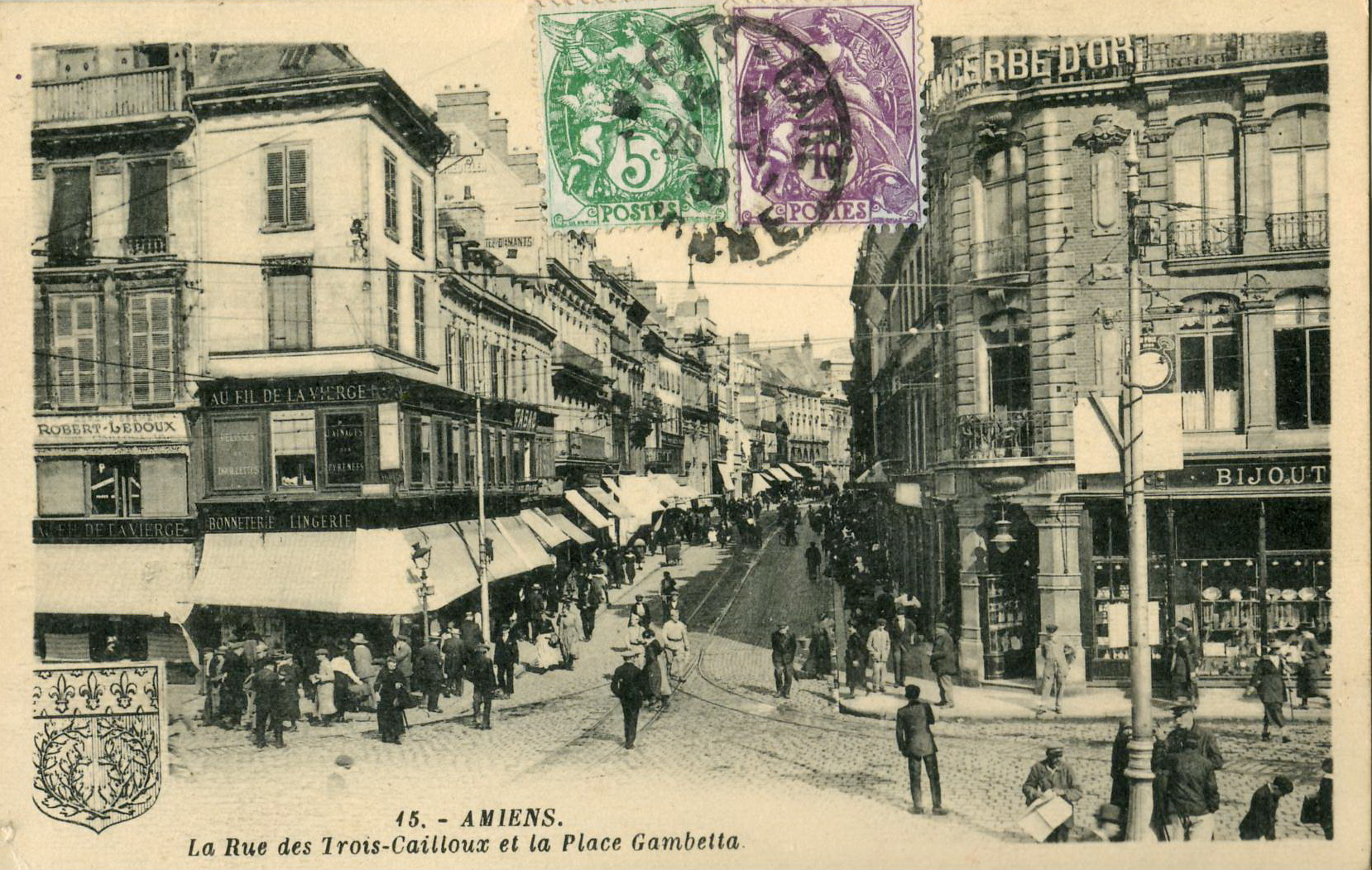
The Rue des Trois-Cailloux, some years later.

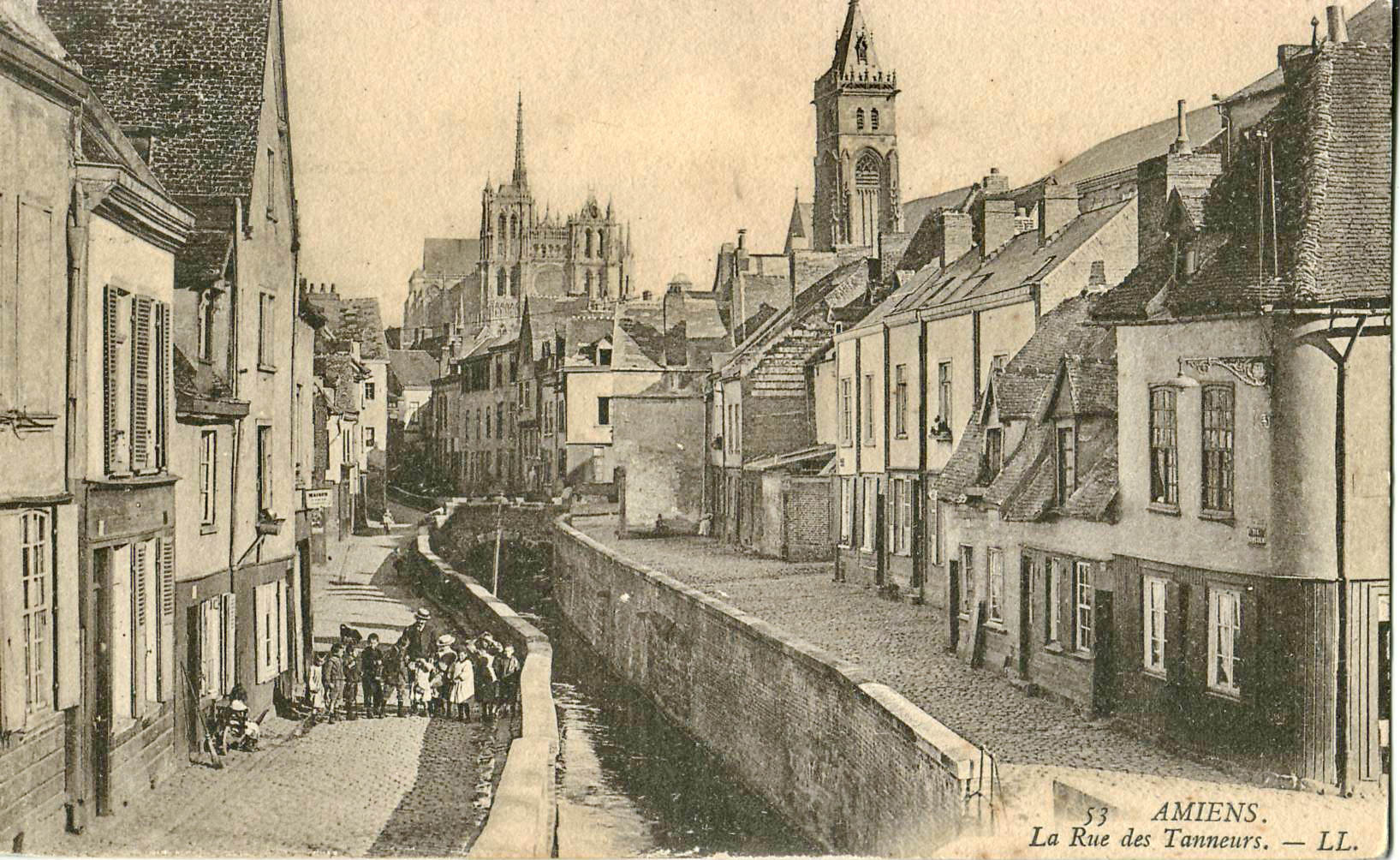
The Rue des Tanneurs.

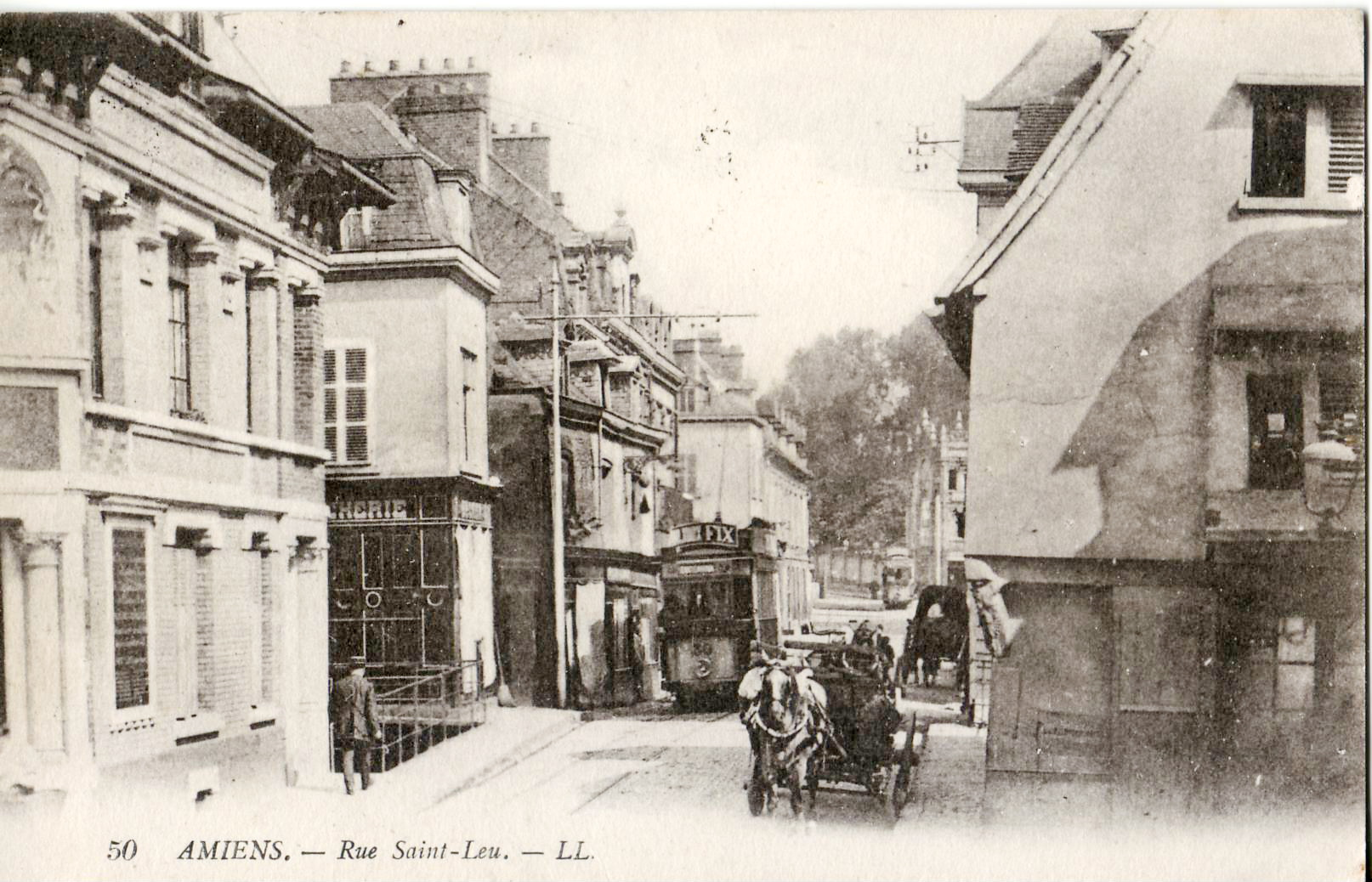
The Rue Saint-Leu.

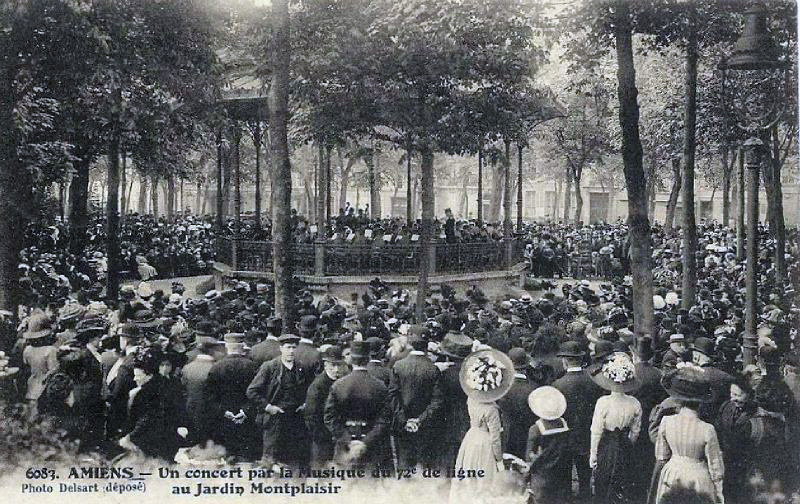
A concert at the Montplaisir bandstand in 1908.

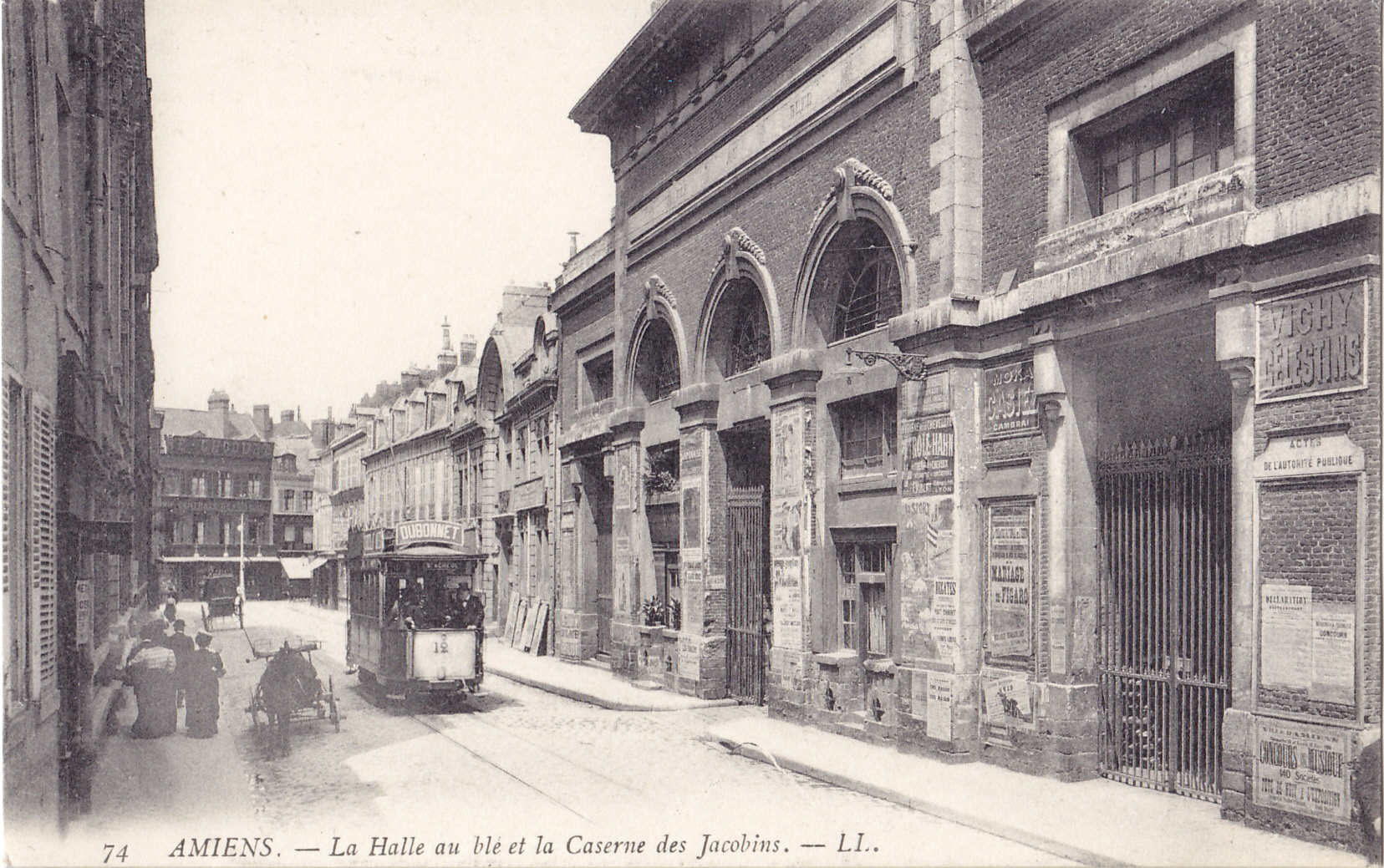
Tram in front of the Corn Exchange, in the early years of the 20th century.

In 1913, the city had 38 clothing manufacturers. The Saint-Leu and Saint-Pierre quarters and the suburb of Hem dominated the textile industry, contrasting with the prosperity of the city centre and uptown by concentrating poverty and substandard housing.

With the declaration of war in the summer of 1914, Amiens, which geographical determinism placed to protect the capital, suffered the brunt of the horrors of war.

=== First World War ===
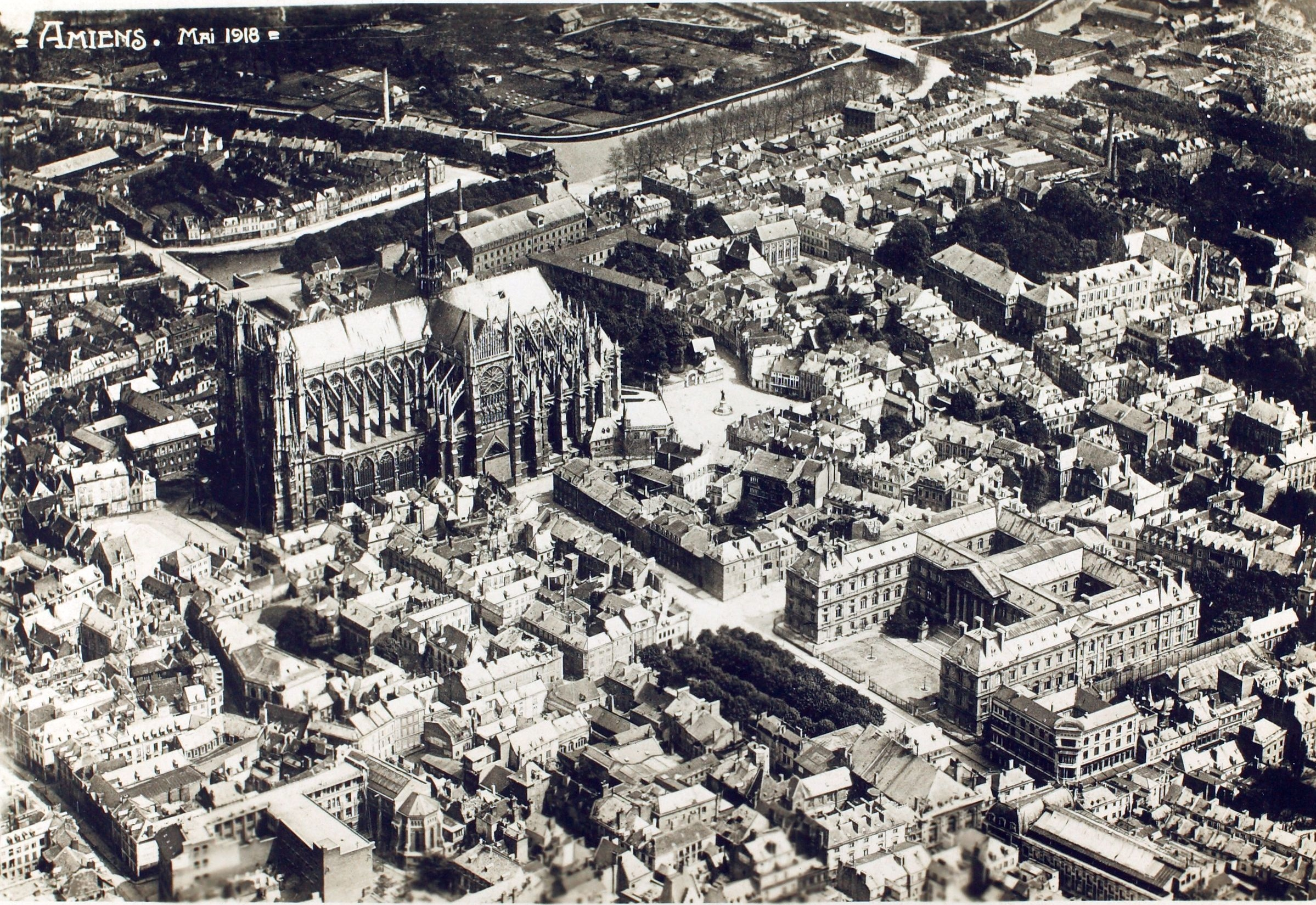
A general view of Amiens in May 1918, during Operation Michael.

At the start of the war, in August 1914, Amiens had been the Advance Base for the British Expeditionary Force. It was captured by the German Army on 31 August 1914, but recaptured by the French on 28 September. The proximity of Amiens to the Western Front and its importance as a rail hub, made it a vital British logistic centre, especially during the Battle of the Somme in 1916. The city was to the immediate rear of the Allied front during most of the war. With 93,000 inhabitants at the start of the war, the population increased to 110,000 during the conflict because of the presence of Allied troops. The population and industries suffered heavy privations (gas, coal, bread, etc.), leading to several strikes, twenty-five alone in 1917. Facing regular bombings, the municipality implemented measures for the protection of historical monuments, such as the cathedral, as early as 1915.

Amiens was one of the key objectives of the German spring offensive which was launched on 27 March 1918 as Operation Michael. The German 2nd Army pushed back the British 5th Army, who fought a series of defensive actions. Eventually, on 4 April, the Germans succeeded in capturing Villers-Bretonneux which overlooked Amiens, only for it to be retaken by an Australian counterattack that night. This was also stopped by the Canadian Cavalry brigade (Lord Strathcona's Horse (Royal Canadians)) at Villers-Bretonneux and Moreuil. During the fighting, Amiens was bombarded by German artillery and aircraft; more than 2,000 buildings were destroyed.

In August, the British Expeditionary Force of Field-Marshal Sir Douglas Haig led the offensive which would become the Battle of Amiens. The attack was intended to release a large part of the railway line between Paris and Amiens. On 8 August 1918, a successful Allied counter stroke, the battle took place and was the opening phase of the Hundred Days Offensive, which led directly to the Armistice with Germany which ended the war.

At the end of the First World War, the civilian toll was 152 killed and 213 wounded, property damage included 731 buildings completely destroyed and nearly 3,000 damaged, in addition to looting.

A reconstruction plan was arranged by Louis Duthoit, replaced in 1921. In 1924, the State rejected the request for war damages made by the municipality. A less ambitious reconstruction began in 1925, as evidenced by a few Art Deco façades.

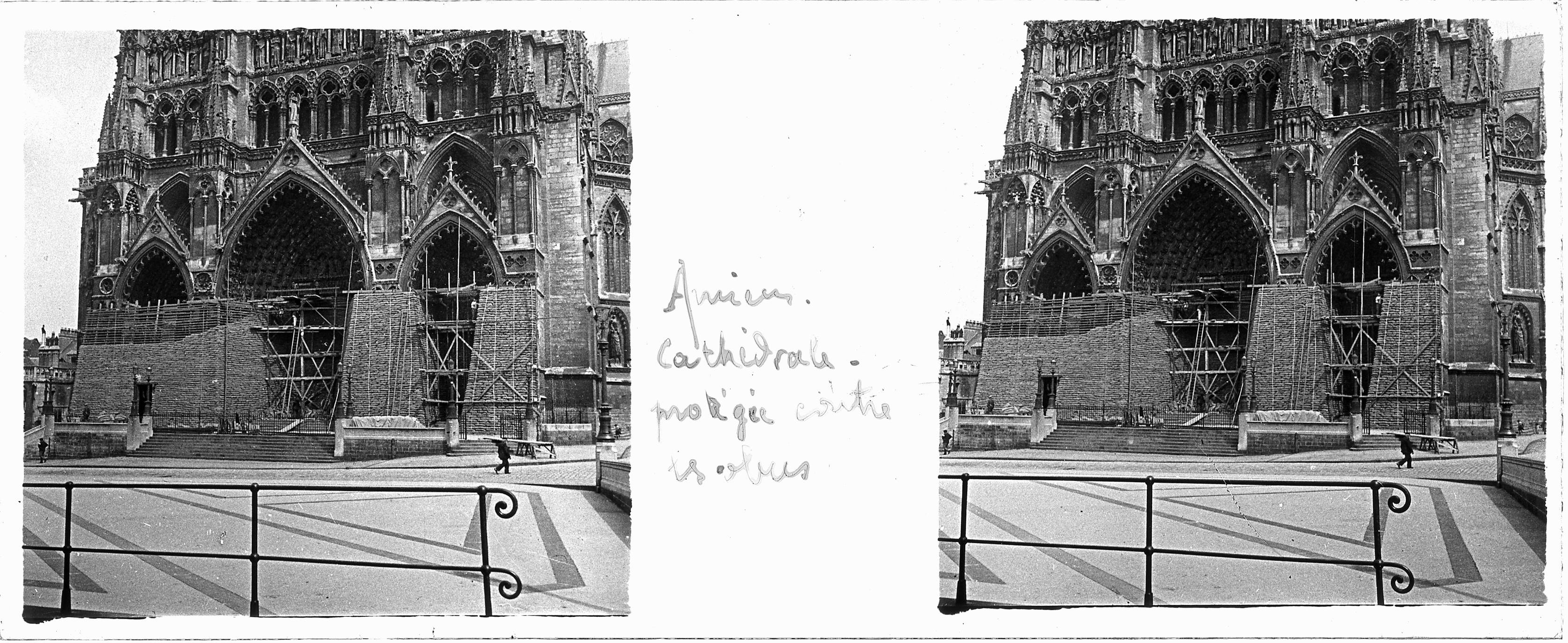
Cathedral protected from shell damage. Archives municipales de Toulouse.

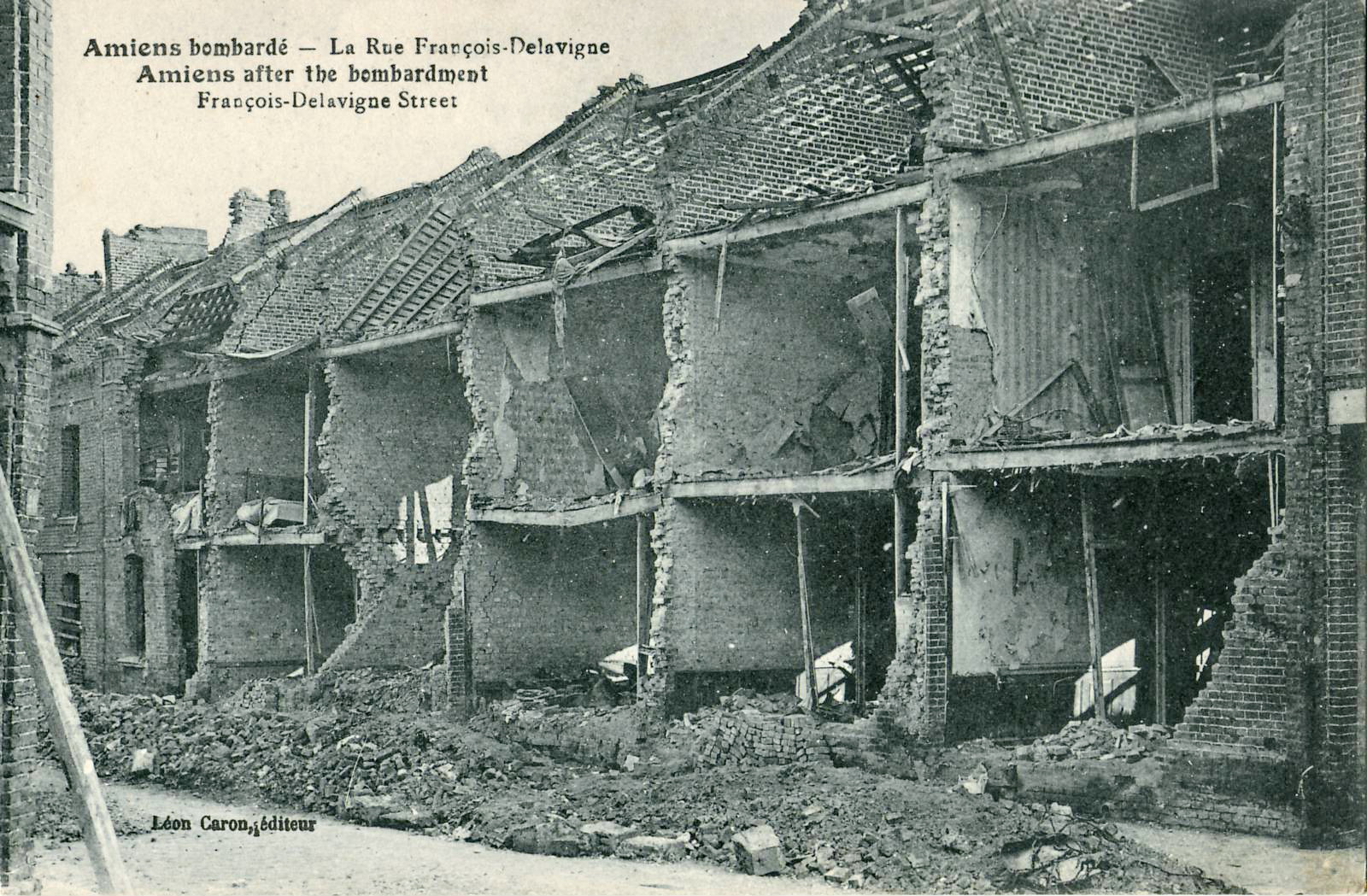
Rue François-Delavigne: Houses in ruins during the First World War.

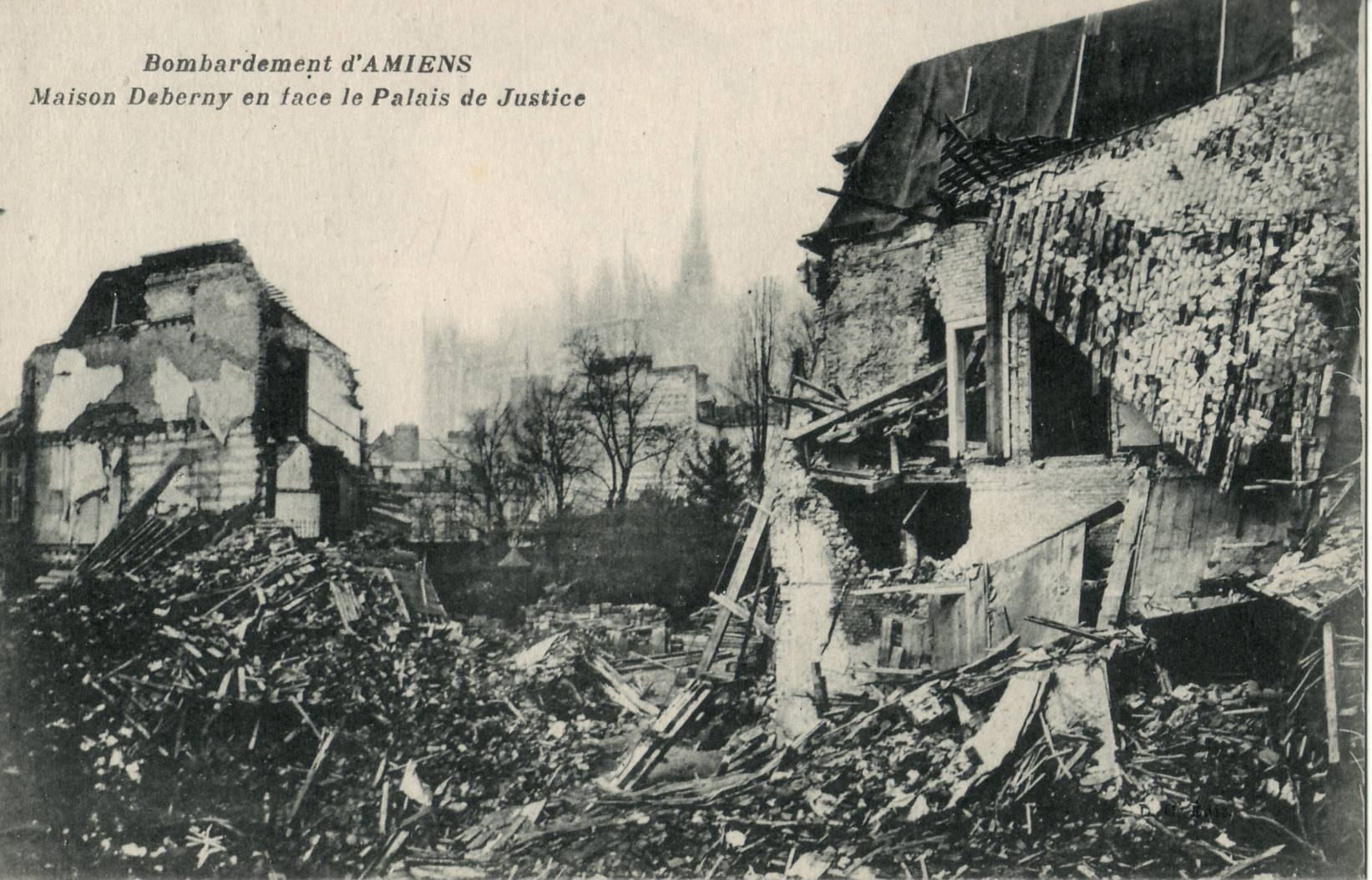
Ruins of Deberny House (opposite the Palais de Justice).

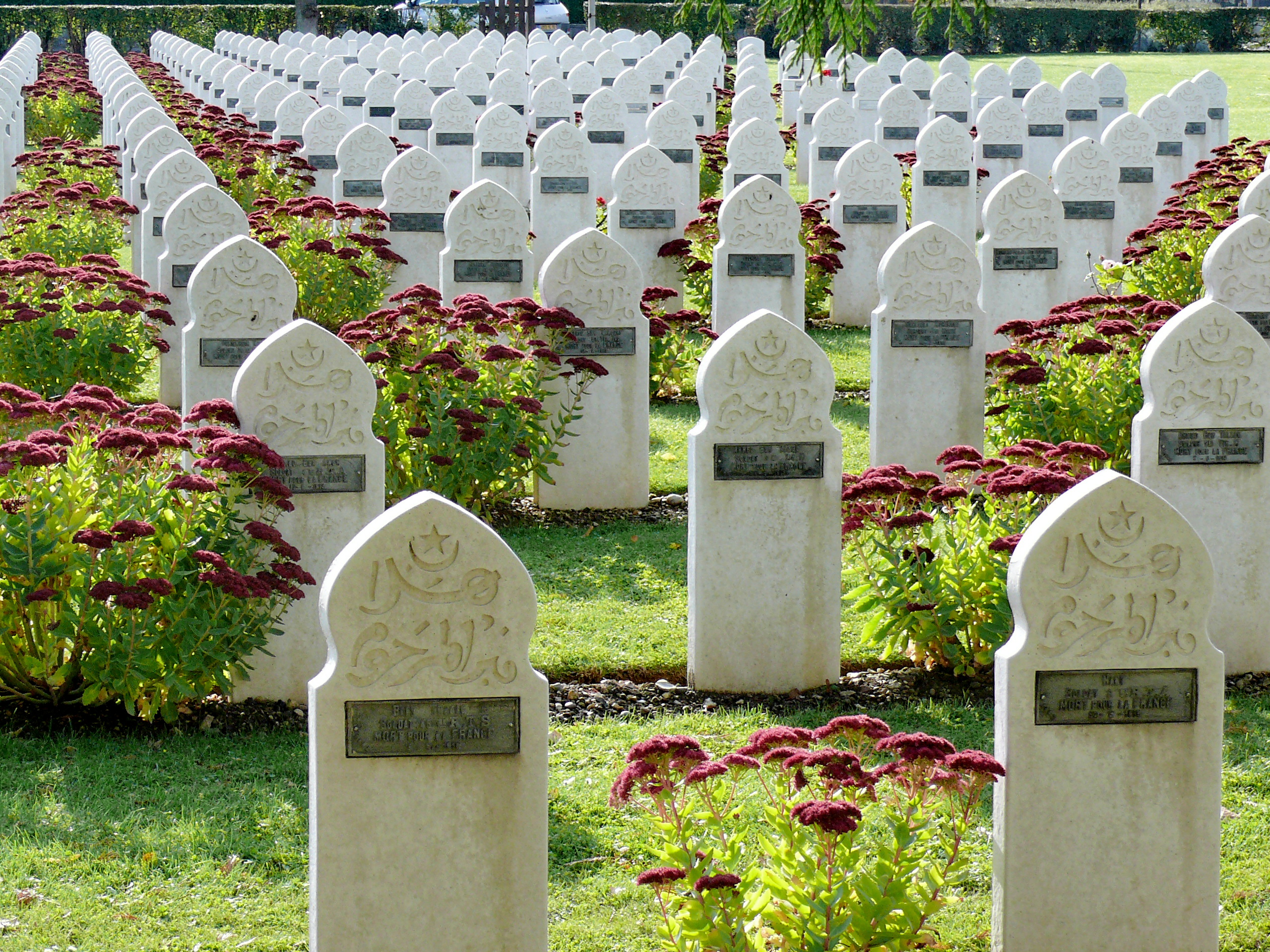
Muslim section of the national cemetery of Saint-Acheul. In the foreground grave of a soldier from the 45th Regiment of Senegalese Tirailleurs who fell at the Battle of the Somme.

=== Second World War ===
The rebuilding of the city centre was not complete from already being heavily hit during the First World War, the city was again stricken by many bombings during the Second World War, in 1940, particularly during the Battle of Amiens in early June. During the Battle of France, Amiens was reached by the German Army's 1st Panzer Division on 20 May 1940, following two days of heavy air raids. The Germans gradually penetrated the city and two other armoured divisions supported the offensive. French and British units were installed in positions to the south of Amiens, and discharged field guns upon the city on 5 June. A last offensive of German armour in numeric superiority, committed from 6 to 8 June, overcame the Franco-British lock, the city definitely fell on 8 June and the Wehrmacht continued its breakthrough in the direction of its next target, Paris. However, the German losses were high: Nearly 200 tanks. Despite the later fighting, the cathedral and a few neighbourhoods were spared, including those Henriville and Saint-Leu. It had been defended by a battalion, the 7th Battalion, Royal Sussex Regiment, a Territorial infantry battalion of the British Army. Of 581 men with the battalion, 132 men are commemorated in CWGC burials, 165 are known to have become prisoners of war and many escaped back to Britain and formed 109th Light Anti-Aircraft Regiment, Royal Artillery.

In 1942, the first reconstruction plans were underway by German officials, and by Pierre Dufau.

On 4 January 1944, the Germans initiated an organised round-up, which resulted in the arrests of 21 Amiens Jews, joined by Jews from the department. First held in Drancy internment camp, most were deported to Auschwitz-Birkenau by Convoy no. 66. There was only a single Amiens survivor, from this convoy, at the end of the war: Renée Louria, who recounted her terrible fate in the Courrier Picard in May 1945.

On 18 February 1944, British aircraft bombed the prison in Amiens as part of Operation Jericho. The raid was intended to aid the escape of members of the French Resistance and political prisoners being held there. In all, 258 prisoners escaped.

Prior to the Normandy landings of 6 June 1944, Allied aircraft concentrated on disabling communications in occupied France, and the railway junction at Longueau to the south east of Amiens was attacked by 200 bombers of the Royal Air Force on the night of the 12 and 13 June. There was much damage in the town itself. Amiens was liberated on 31 August 1944 by the 11th Armoured Division, part of 30 Corps commanded by Lieutenant-General Brian Horrocks.

=== Post-war period ===
The city was rebuilt according to Pierre Dufau's plans, the reconstruction and development plan was adopted as early as July 1942. With a focus on widening the streets to ease traffic congestion. These newer structures were primarily built of brick, concrete and white stone with slate roofs. The Place Gambetta was furnished by the architect Alexandre Courtois, the architect Auguste Perret designed the Gare d'Amiens railway station, the Place de la Gare, and the nearby Tour Perret. Meanwhile, Dufau focussed on the market square and the cathedral square.

On 2 June 1960, the new region of Picardy was formed from the departments of Aisne, Oise and Somme.

A wind of protest which blew over France and the world at the end of the 1960s, also affected Amiens. First, a demonstration opposing the Vietnam War was organised on 21 October 1967. Then, while the House of Culture hosted the National Education Minister Alain Peyrefitte in mid-March 1968, at a symposium on education, Amiens students followed suit from the events in Paris by marching in protest on 6 and 7 May. Factory and the railway workers in the city joined them a few days later on 17 May. The next day, the Longueau railwaymen blocked points, Ferodo workers occupied their factory from 20 May for five weeks.

Although not experiencing clashes comparable to those in Paris, the city was quickly paralysed. The absence of household waste collection gave the streets a foul odour, and the department was short of petrol from 22 May. Against this movement of left, the extreme right was not absent: While militants had thrown an explosive device in protest at the Communist permanence of the city on 23 December 1967, members of Occident opposed students on 21 May, in front of the Picardy cinema. During the night of 27–28 May, students tried to take the House of Culture. In the aftermath of President Charles de Gaulle's radio address, his supporters in Amiens demonstrated in the streets on 31 May, while recovery was committed the following week. Faure law promulgated, the University of Amiens was created on 26 October, founded on a campus in the southwestern suburbs of the city.

=== Since the 1970s ===
The city suffered the loss of many jobs as manufacturing plants in the region closed during the late 1970s and 1980s. Despite the hardships, the city made an effort to renovate the degraded area of St-Leu during this time.

The 1990s saw a great period of rebirth in the city. The St-Leu renovations were completed, the parc Saint-Pierre was redesigned and part the University of Picardy moved into new buildings in the city centre. The Vallée des Vignes commercial district was developed in the south of the city, and large parts of the city center were converted to pedestrian areas.

Since 2006, there has been a comprehensive programme for the restructuring of the station quarter, the Gare la Vallée project, is in progress. Since June 2008, the vast architectural transformation of the station square facilitates access to the station for people with reduced mobility and pedestrian continuity between the city hall and the station. The Gare du Nord has been renovated with a controversial new glass roof. The Tour Perret was renovated as well and a new cinema complex was built, reorganising the area around the railway station.

== Military life ==
Units which have been stationed at Amiens:

- Staff of the 2nd Military Region before 1913 -
- Staff of the 2nd Army Corps, before 1906-1913 -
- Staff of the 3rd Infantry Division, before 1913-1928 -
- Staff of the 4th Infantry Division, before 1913 -
- Staff of the 3rd Cavalry Division, before 1913 -
- Staff of the 3rd Motorised Infantry Division, 1928 -
- Staff of the 1st Brigade of Spahis, (Note: Composed of 4th Regiment of the Moroccan Spahis and of the 6e régiment de spahis algériens.) before August 1939 -
- Staff of the 3rd Group of Cavalry, (Note: Composed of 7th Cavalry Regiment and of the 6th and 7th group of armoured cars.) before August 1939 -
- 51st Infantry Regiment (France), August 1939
- 72nd Infantry Regiment (France), before 1906-1913 -
- 8th Battalion of Foot Chasseurs, 1906
- 2nd Legion of Gendarmerie, 1906
- Staff of the 8th Infantry Division, until its dissolution in 1993
- 8th Regiment of Command and Support, until its dissolution in 1993.

== See also ==
- Timeline of Amiens
- History of Paris
