= Hôtel Auguste-Lepoutre =

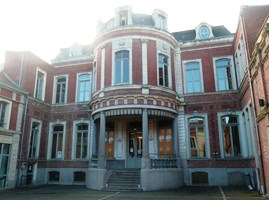
- Interactive map of the Hôtel Auguste-Lepoutre area

General information
- Type: hôtel particulier
- Location: 301 avenue des Nations-Unies, Roubaix, France
- Coordinates: 50°41′37″N 3°10′36″E
- Completed: 1880

The Hôtel Auguste-Lepoutre is a historic hôtel particulier in Roubaix, Nord, France. It was built in 1880 for Amédée Prouvost-Yon. It was rented by Auguste Lepoutre from 1902 onwards, and it was turned into a police station in 1940. It has been listed as a monument historique since 1999.
