= Lille Congress =

The Lille Congress was the twelfth national congress of the French Socialist Party (Parti socialiste or PS). It took place from 3 to 5 April 1987.

== Results ==
Popular vote
Unity Motion	98.4%

Lionel Jospin was elected as First Secretary. In 1988, he was replaced by Pierre Mauroy.
