= Auguste Lepoutre =

French politician

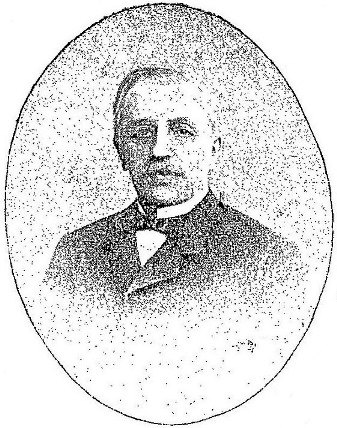
- Born: 28 May 1825; Lomme, Nord, France
- Died: 5 December 1903 (aged 78); Roubaix, Nord, France
- Occupation: Politician

Auguste Lepoutre (28 May 1825 - 5 December 1903) was a French politician. He served as a member of the Chamber of Deputies from 1885 to 1889, representing Nord.
