= Institut technologique européen d'entrepreneuriat et de management =

ITEEM (Institut technologique européen d'entrepreneuriat et de management) is a French institute created as a joint venture between École centrale de Lille, a graduate engineering school, and Skema Business School (Issued from CERAM Business School and ESC Lille graduate school of management).
It is dedicated to entrepreneurship education.

ITEEM was established in 2003 and operates as a department of École centrale de Lille. It enrolls undergraduate students for a 5-year courses towards a master's degree, the title of « Ingénieurs Managers Entrepreneurs » (Engineers, Managers, Entrepreneurs).

ITEIt is situated on the campus of Lille University of Science and Technology.
