= Tour Perret (Amiens) =

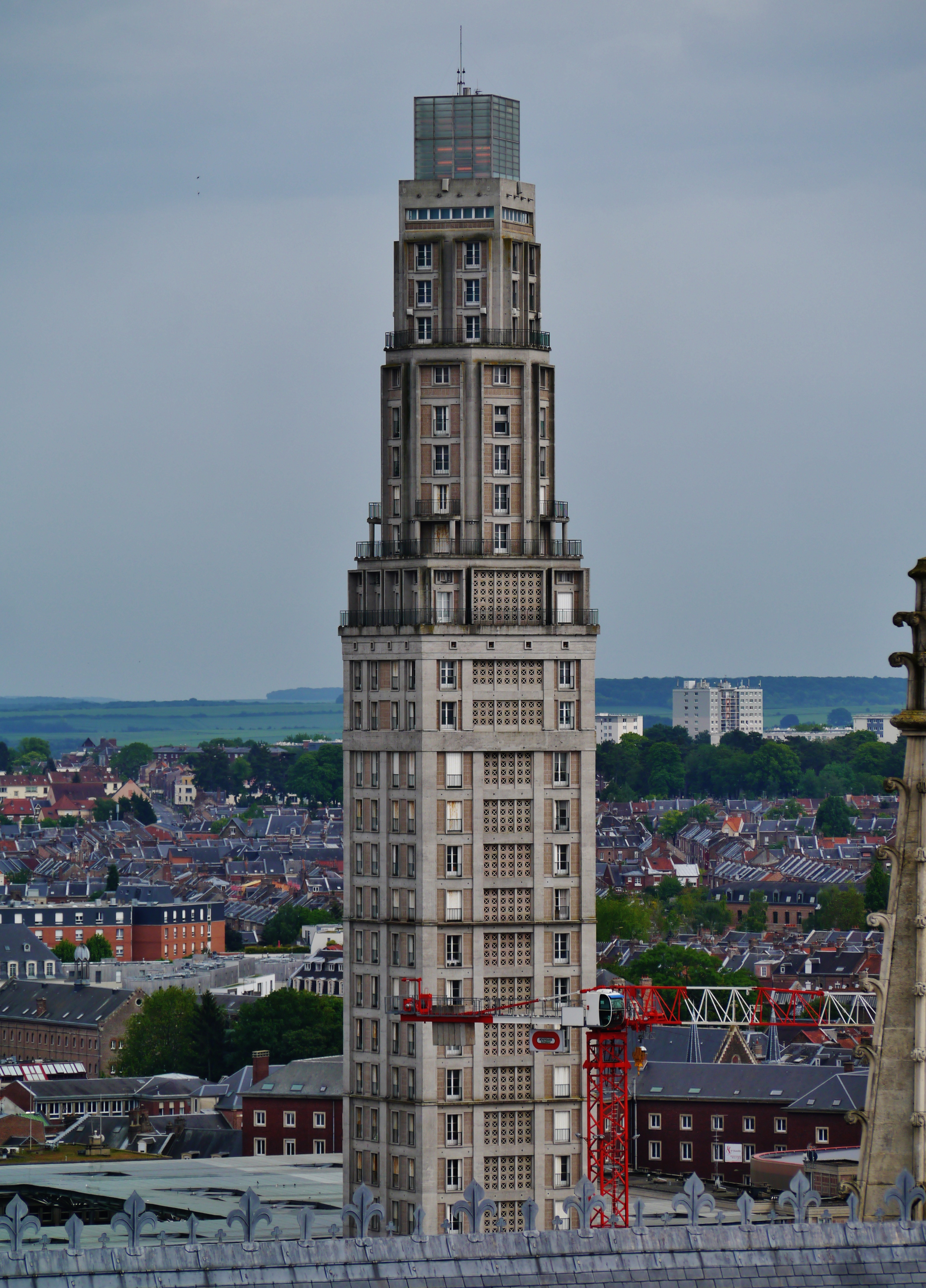
- Interactive map of the Tour Perret area

General information
- Status: Completed
- Type: Residential apartments
- Architectural style: Early modernism
- Location: 13 Place Alphonse-Fiquet; Amiens, France
- Coordinates: 49.8909°N 2.3063°E
- Completed: 1949–1952

Height
- Antenna spire: 110 m (360 ft)
- Roof: 103.9 m (341 ft)

Technical details
- Floor count: 25

Design and construction
- Architect: Auguste Perret
- Developer: Ministry of Reconstruction and Urban Development
- Main contractor: A. Bouvet et fils

Tour Perret ('Perret Tower') is a 29-storey, 110 m (360 ft) residential skyscraper in Amiens, France. It has been described as France's first skyscraper, and was registered as a historic monument in 1975.

Its building was part of a large scale reconstruction project helmed by architect Auguste Perret in the Place Alphone-Fiquet neighborhood, which also involved a rebuild of the nearby railway station. The design phase started as early as 1942, following extensive damages suffered by downtown Amiens during World War II. Perret intended it as an office building before authorities overruled him.

Originally measuring 104 metres, Tour Perret was the highest, and the first 100-plus metre skyscraper built in France, although it was not the highest in Western Europe, as it has sometimes been written. The building actually fell slightly short of its intended height as its topmost part, a belfry adorned with a monumental clock, was never built due to delays and cost overruns.

In 2005, the tower was finally completed with a so-called Sablier de lumière (English: Hourglass of Light) designed by architect Thierry Van de Wyngaert. It is a cube made of 192 active glass panels whose transparency can be electrically adjusted, illuminated by twelve circular neon lamps which project different colors depending on the time of day. In 2017, the lighting system was redesigned and simplified for cost and practicality. The cube's addition brought the height of the building up to 110 metres.
