= Clement Cruttwell =

English literary compiler

Clement Cruttwell (1743 – 5 August 1808) was an English surgeon, priest, cartographer, and compiler of religious works and gazetteers. He was best known in his lifetime for his gazetteers, particularly his 'Universal Gazetteer', and today for his maps.

== Biography ==
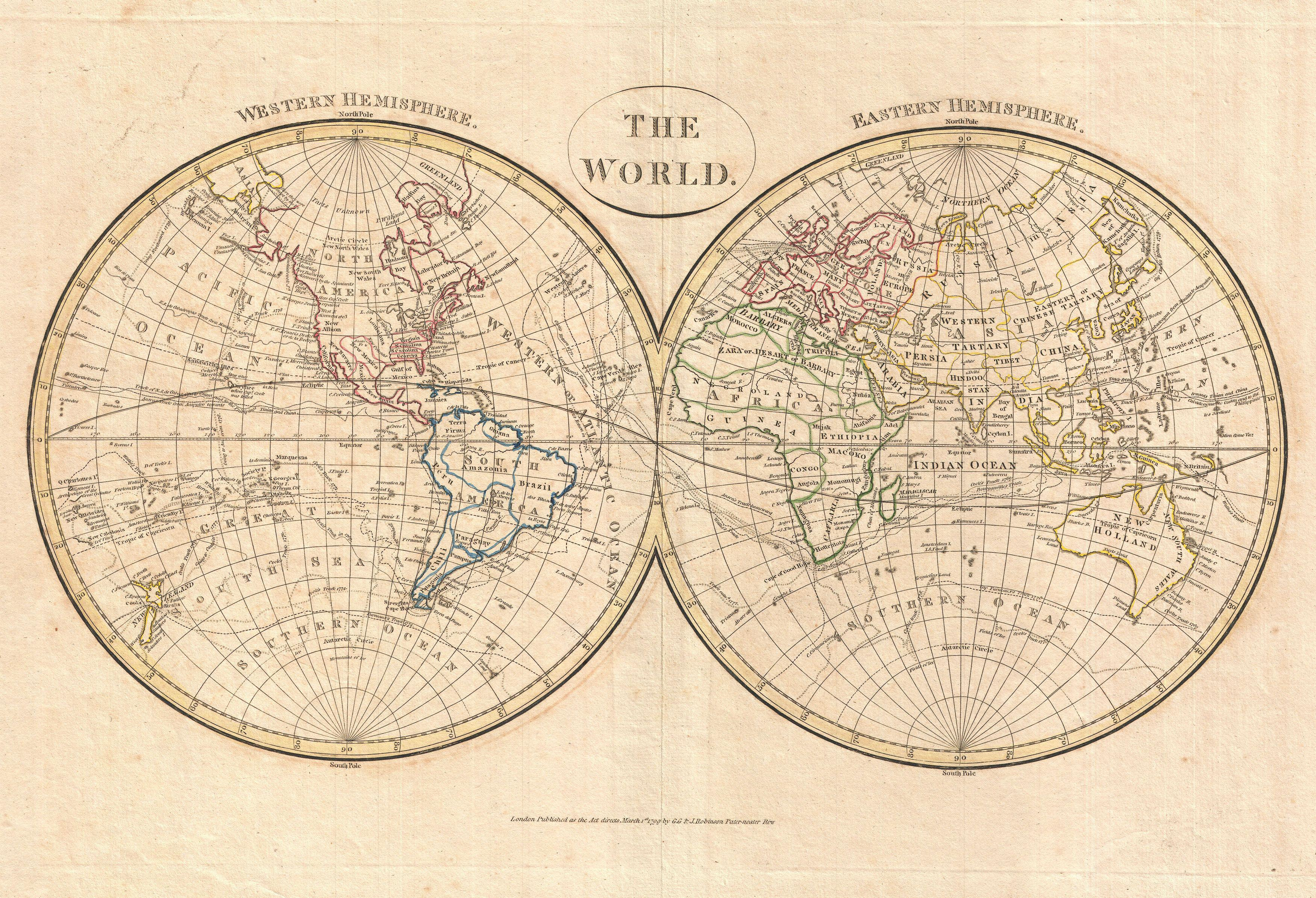
1799 Cruttwell Map of the World in Hemispheres

Cruttwell was born at Wokingham, Berkshire in 1743.

At age 15, on 10 March 1758, Cruttwell was apprenticed to William Mellish, a surgeon of Uxbridge, for seven years. His father, William Cruttwell, paid an indenture fee of 100 guineas. On 9 February 1771 he married Sarah Brooks. He commenced his career as a surgeon at Bath, where he published his ‘Advice to Lying-in Women’ in 1779.

He enrolled at St Mary Hall, Oxford on 14 December 1780. He soon afterwards took orders. He published Bishop Thomas Wilson's Bible and an autobiography in 1785. He then began his ‘Concordance of the Parallel Texts of Scripture’ (1790), which he printed in his own house, and on its completion his health was so broken down that he went to the baths of Saint-Amand for a cure. His ‘Gazetteer of France’ (1793) and ‘Gazetteer of the Netherlands’ (1794) were succeeded by his ‘Universal Gazetteer’ (1798), an enormous compilation, of which the entire edition was quickly sold out. He was engaged on a second edition of this great work, which was to contain thirty thousand fresh articles, when he died suddenly while on the way to his native town, at Froxfield in Wiltshire, on 5 August 1808.

== Works ==
- Clement Cruttwell (1793). Gazetteer of France. London: G.G.J. and J. Robinson – via HathiTrust. "Translation of Dictionnaire geographique portatif de la France"
  - v.1. (A-Fus); v.2; v.3 (Q-Z)
- Attributed to Clement Cruttwell (1794). Gazetteer of the Netherlands. London: G.G.J. and J. Robinson – via Google Books.
