= 2015 Nord-Pas-de-Calais-Picardie regional election =

- 6 and 13 December 2015

All 170 Regional Councillors
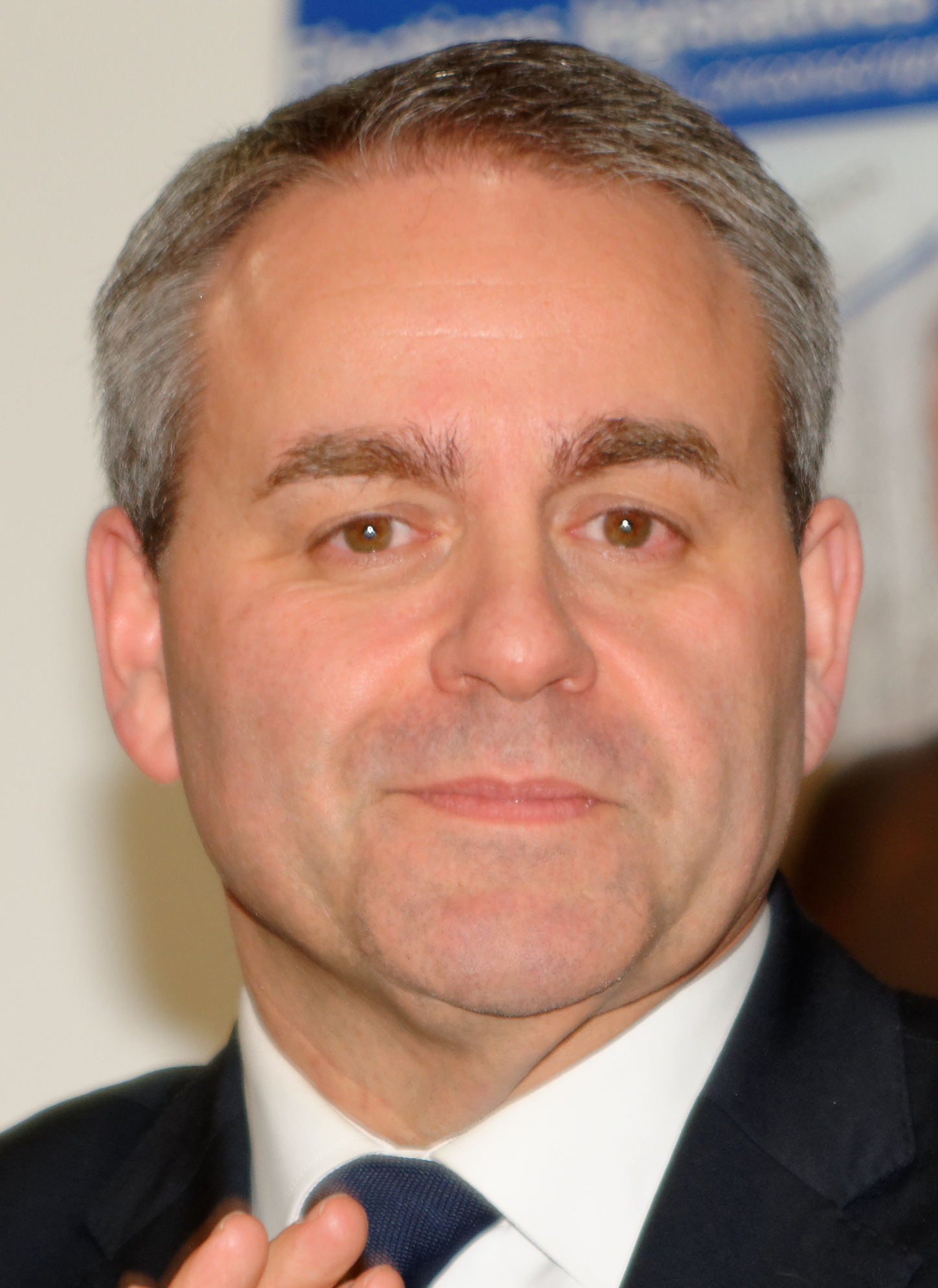

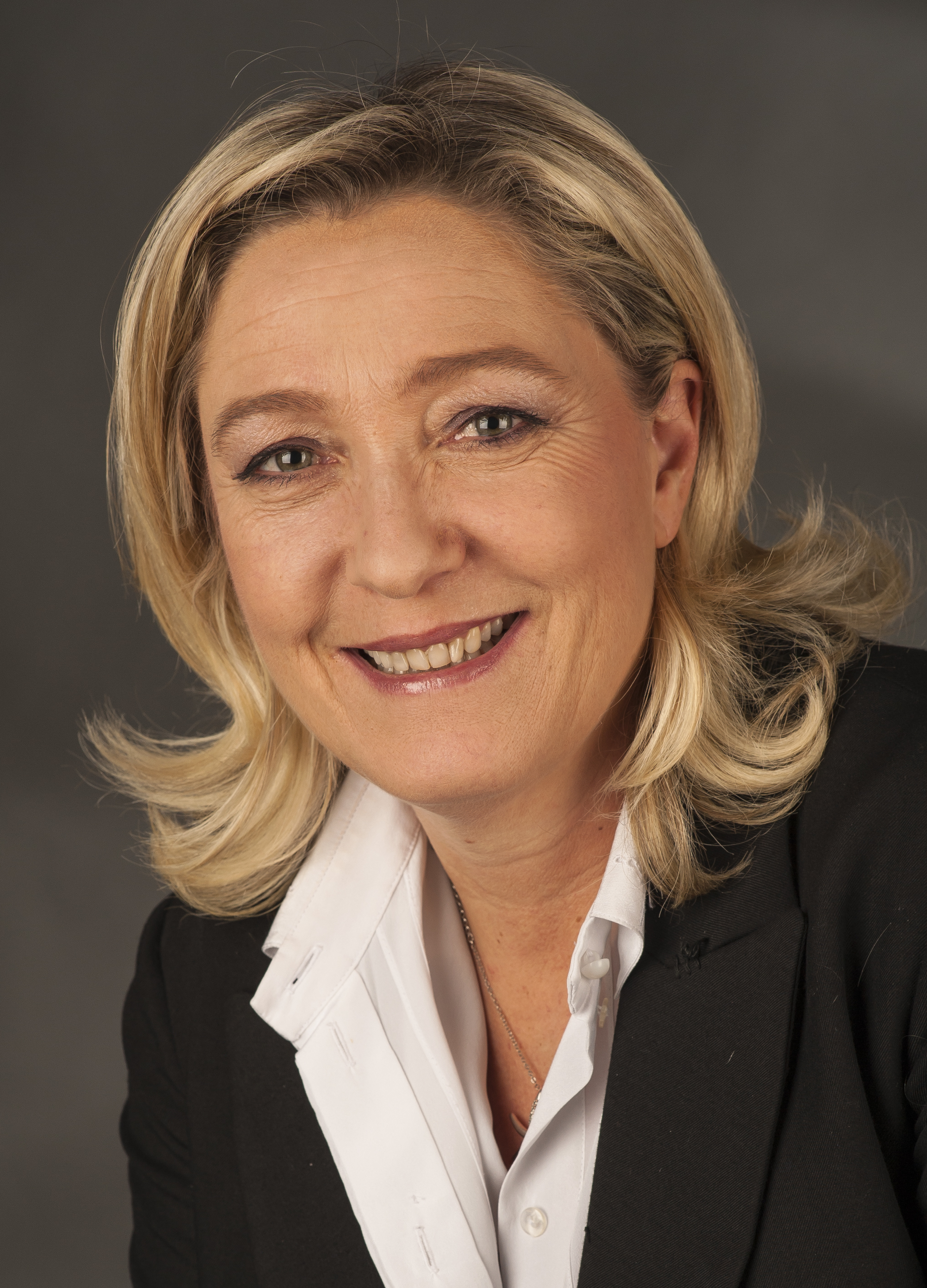

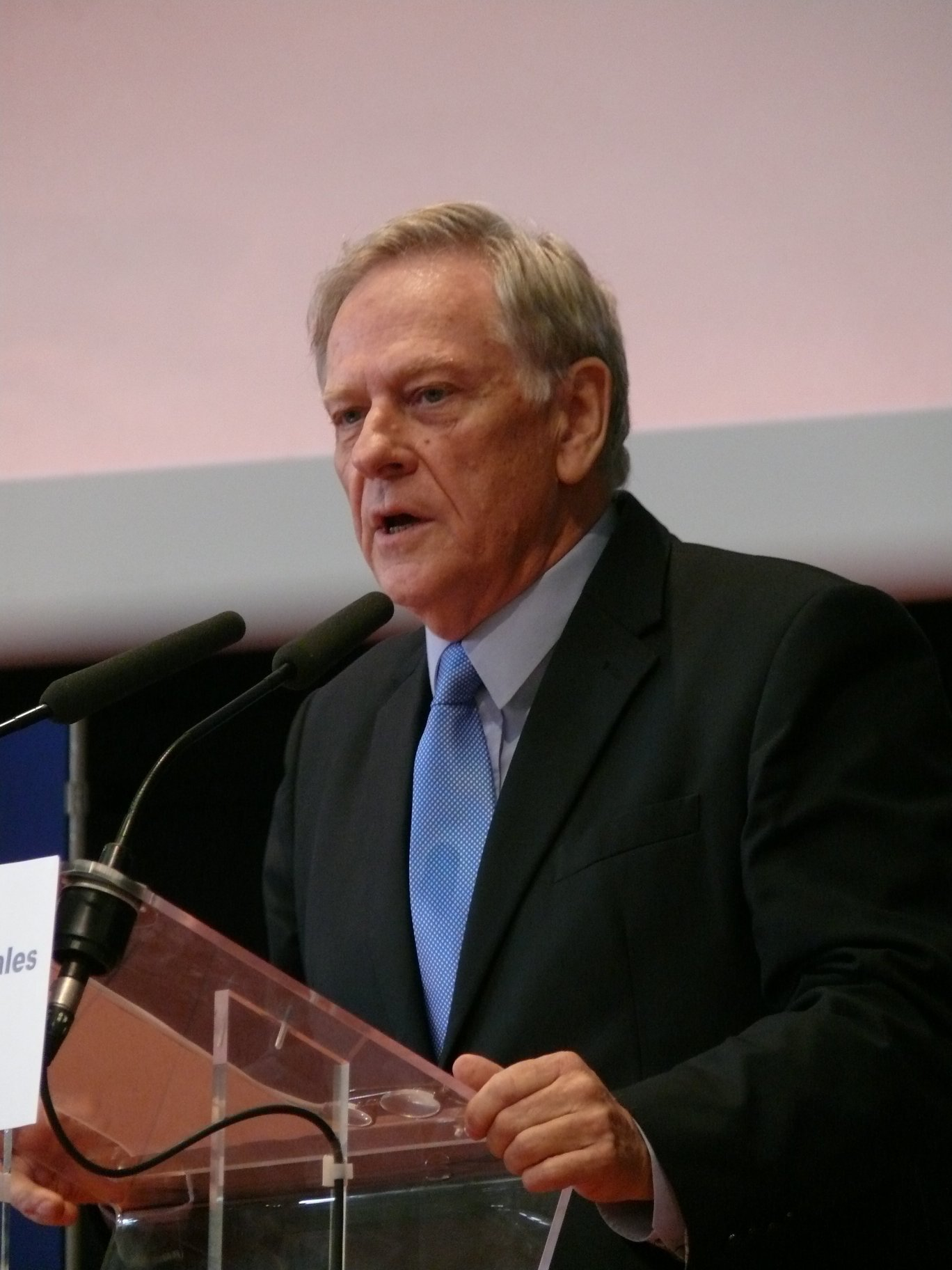
	First party	Second party	Third party
Leader	Xavier Bertrand	Marine Le Pen	Pierre de Saintignon
Party	LR	FN	PS
Seats won	116	54	0
First round	558,420	909,035	405,199
Percentage	24.97%	40.6%	18.1%
Second round	1,389,340	1,015,662	Withdrew
Percentage	57.8%	42.2%	Withdrew
President of the Regional Council before election
Position created
Elected President of the Regional Council
Xavier Bertrand
The Republicans (France)

The first Regional Elections of Nord-Pas-de-Calais-Picardie were held on 6 and 13 December 2015. At stake were the Regional Council of Nord-Pas-de-Calais-Picardie.

These elections were the first to be held for the redrawn regions- the 27 regions of France were amalgamated into 18, this went into effect on 1 January 2016. The former regions of Nord-Pas-de-Calais and Picardy were merged and became the region of Nord-Pas-de-Calais-Picardie, later named Hauts-de-France.

== Voting system ==
The regional elections are held in direct universal suffrage using proportional representation lists. The election is held over two rounds, with majority bonus. The lists must be gender balanced by alternatively have a male candidate and a female candidate from the top to the bottom of the list. Only lists with as many candidates as available seats in every departement of the region may compete.

Following the 1999 and 2003 electoral reforms, with a first implementation in 2004, a two-round runoff voting system is used to elect the regional presidents. If no party gets at least 50% of the vote in the first round, a second round is held, which any party who got at least 10% in the first round may enter. Lists that obtain at least 5% of the vote in the first round may merge in the second round with a 'qualified list', which includes candidates from each merged list.

At the decisive round (first round if a list won 50%, the second round if not), the leading list receives a premium of 25% of the seats while the remaining seats are distributed among all lists who received at least 5% of votes. Thus, the majority bonus allows a leading list to have an absolute majority of seats in the Regional Council from one third of votes in the second round. The seats are distributed among the lists at the regional level but within each list, seats are allocated by departmental branch in proportion to the number of votes in each department.

In the regional council there are 170 members, and they are elected in the 5 departments(17 members for Aisne, 25 for Oise, 18 for the Somme, 76 for the Nord and 44 for Pas-de-Calais

== Results ==
France uses a two-round runoff system to elect the regional presidencies, and as such not all seats contested will see a candidate elected in the first round.

=== First round ===
The first round election was held on 6 December 2015.

List	Votes	Votes %
Socialist Party	405,199	18.1
French Communist Party	119,081	5.3
Europe Ecology – The Greens	107,993	4.8
Total left-wing	632,273	28,27
The Republicans (France)	558,420	24.97
France Arise	53,359	2.39
Nous Citoyens	30,319	1.36
Total right-wing	642,098	28.72
National Front	909,035	40.64
Total far-right	909,035	40.64
Lutte Ouvrière	39,041	1.75
Popular Republican Union	14,345	0.64
Total	2,322,851	100
Registered voters/turnout	4,237,839	54.81

=== Second round ===
Runoff elections were held on 13 December 2015 in regions where no candidate was able to win outright in the first round.

After the first round, the Front National achieve nearly 41% of the votes and the Socialist candidate decided to withdraw his list from competing in the second round, in an attempt to block Marine Le Pen and the Front National from becoming the majority party in the second round due to split opposition from the centre-left and centre-right blocs.

The result was a disappointment for the Front National, which was unable to win any of the regional presidencies, including Nord-Pas-de-Calais-Picardie, in the face of concerted tactical voting. However, they managed to increase their share of the vote from the first round. Of the 12 regions in mainland France, 7 were won by the Republicans and 5 were retained by the Socialists.

List	Votes	Votes %	Seats	Seats %
Union of the Right	1,389,340	57.77	116	68.24
National Front	1,015,662	42.23	54	31.76
Total	2,595,417	100	170	100
Registered voters/turnout	4,237,939	61.24		

=== Distribution by departments ===
Constituency	LR		FN	
Constituency	%	S	%	S
Aisne	53.8	9	46.2	5
Oise	55.9	15	44.1	7
Somme	56.4	11	43.6	5
Nord	61.8	52	38.2	21
Pas-de-Calais	54.1	29	45.9	16
Total	57.8	116	42.2	54
