= Hôtel de Ville, Maubeuge =

Town hall in Maubeuge, France

Hôtel de Ville
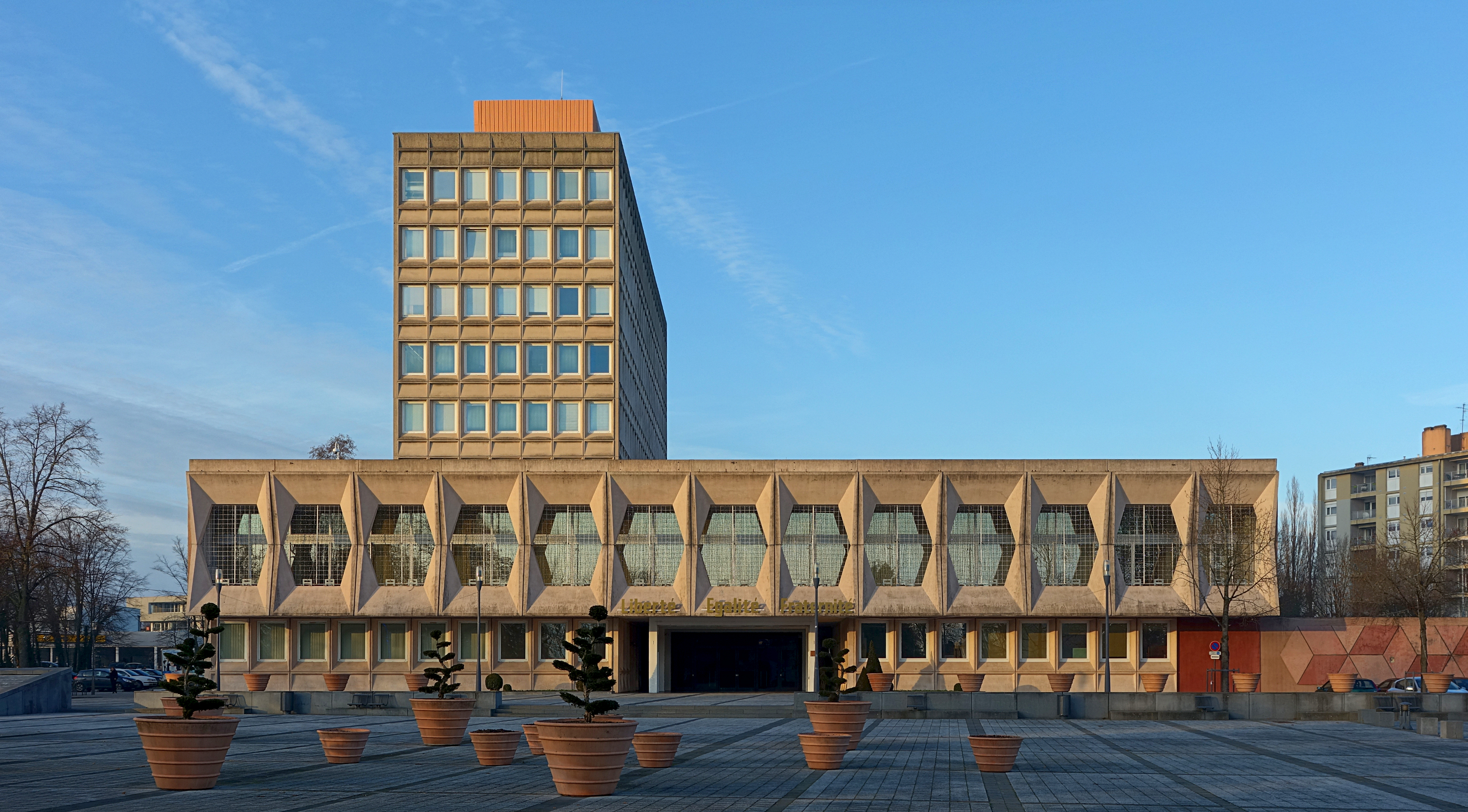
- The main frontage of the Hôtel de Ville in December 2013
- Interactive map of the Hôtel de Ville area

General information
- Type: City hall
- Architectural style: Modern style
- Location: Maubeuge, France
- Coordinates: 50.2800°N 3.9673°E
- Completed: 1970

Design and construction
- Architects: Jacques Corbeau and André Gaillard

The Hôtel de Ville (French pronunciation: [otɛl də vil], City Hall) is a municipal building in Maubeuge, Nord, northern France, standing on Place de l'Hôtel de Ville.

== History ==
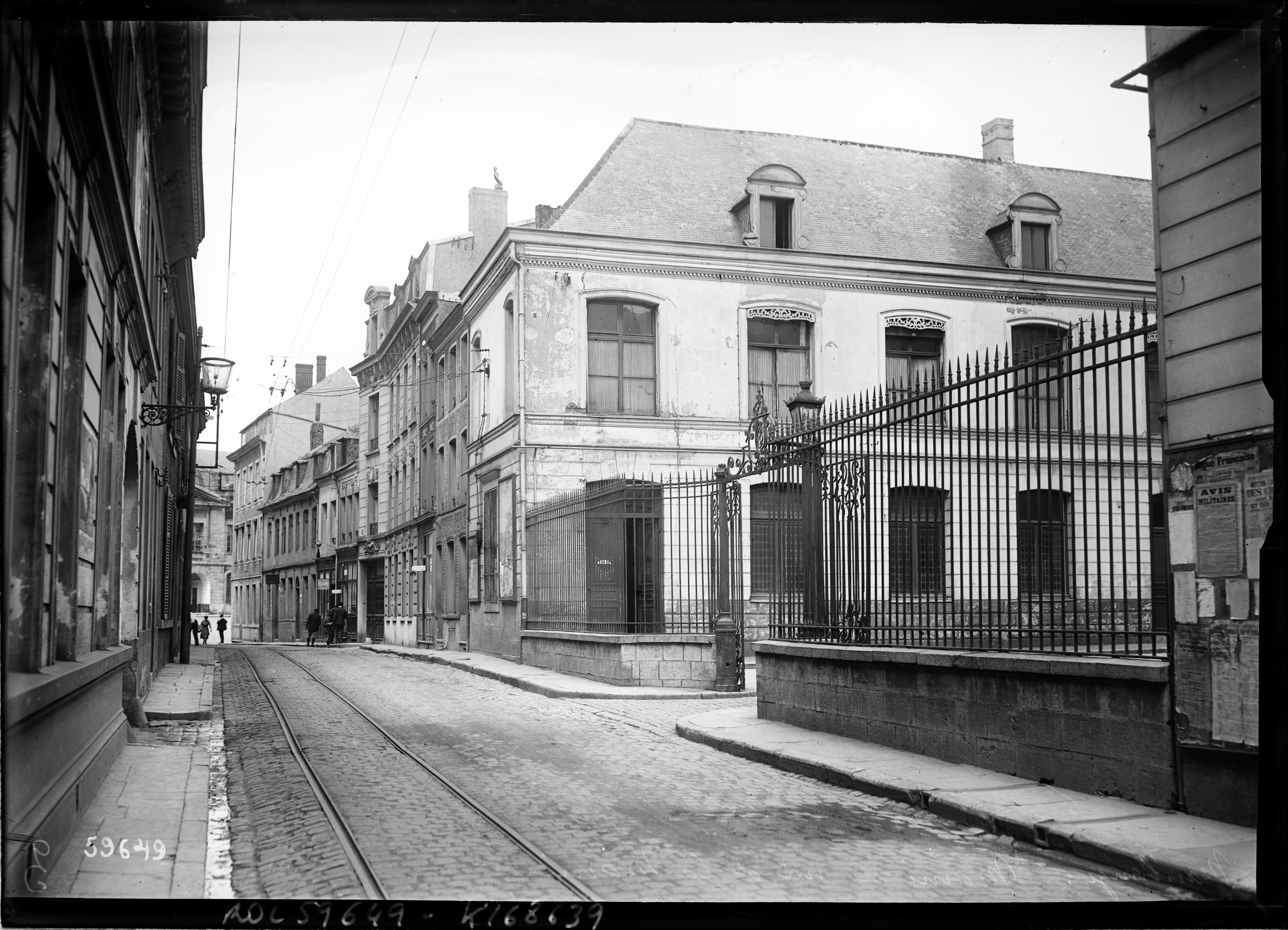
Rue de la Mairie in June 1920; the north wing of the Hôtel de Ville can be seen on the right

The first town hall in Maubeuge, on the north side of the Market Place, dated back to the 12th century. It was known as the Hôtel de la Tour Jolie.

After the first town hall became dilapidated in the mid-18th century, the council moved to a building on the east side of Rue Bégard (also known as Rue Bigard, and later known as Rue de la Mairie) in 1778. This building, which served as the town hall for a century and a half, was laid out as a typical hôtel particulier with a grand entrance, a grand courtyard and three façades. The three facades, facing north, east and south were fenestrated with segmental headed casement windows and, above the two middle bays on the east facade, there was an ornate pediment containing a medallion, carved with the town coat of arms, flanked by scrolls and supported by a festoon. Internally, the building contained a fine assembly room, and politicians who attended meetings in the town hall included Sadi Carnot, Charles Daniel-Vincent, Jean-Baptiste Lebas, Léo Lagrange and Roger Salengro.

After the siege of Maubeuge in August 1914, during the First World War, German forces occupied the town and made the town hall their command post. After the war, routine administration was relocated to a building in Rue Saint-Jacques.

In May 1940, during Battle of France, part of the Second World War, German forces outflanked the Fortified Sector of Maubeuge and destroyed much of the town, including its town hall. The council initially moved to wooden barracks in Place Verdun, but then relocated to temporary offices on the northwest of the town on what is now Rue de Mairieux. It was at these offices that the president of France, Charles de Gaulle, met with the council in September 1959.

In the 1960s, the council decided to commission a new town hall: the site they selected was just to the north of the Zoological Park. Construction of the new building started in 1968. It was designed by Jacques Corbeau and André Gaillard in the modern style, built in reinforced concrete, and was officially opened by the mayor, Pierre Forest, and the prefect of the department, Pierre Dumont, on 5 September 1970.

The layout involved a large rectangular civic block at the front, with an eight-storey service block behind. The civic block featured a three-bay glass doorway, in the centre, flanked by 18 small casement windows. On the first floor, there was a row of 13 geometric shapes, created by the artist, Victor Vasarely, in the trompe-l'œil style of the time, which were cantilevered out over the pavement. Internally, the principal rooms were the Salle du Conseil (council chamber), and the Salle D'Honneur (ballroom).
