= Lille Synagogue =

Synagogue located in Nord, in France

- French: Synagogue de Lille
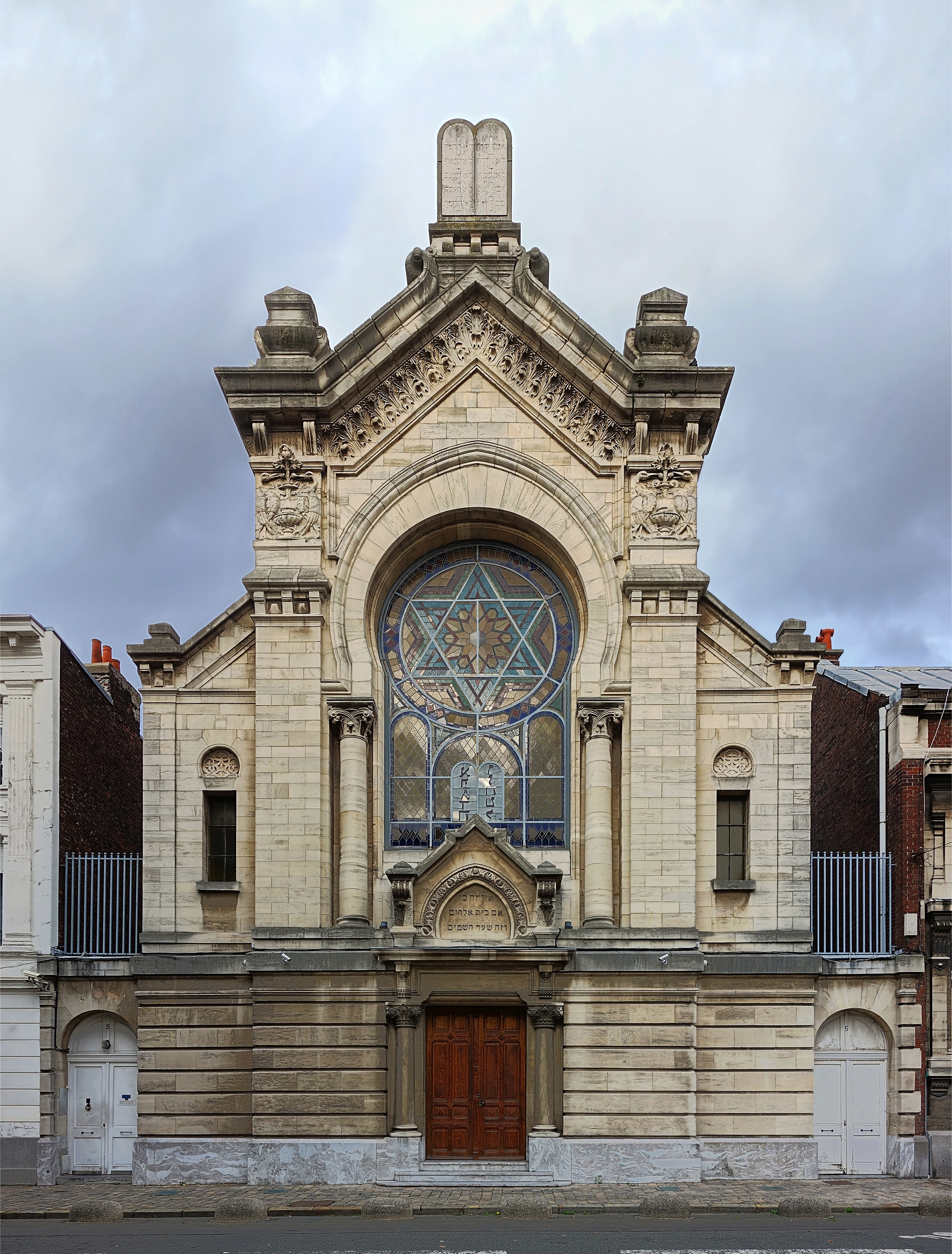
- The synagogue in

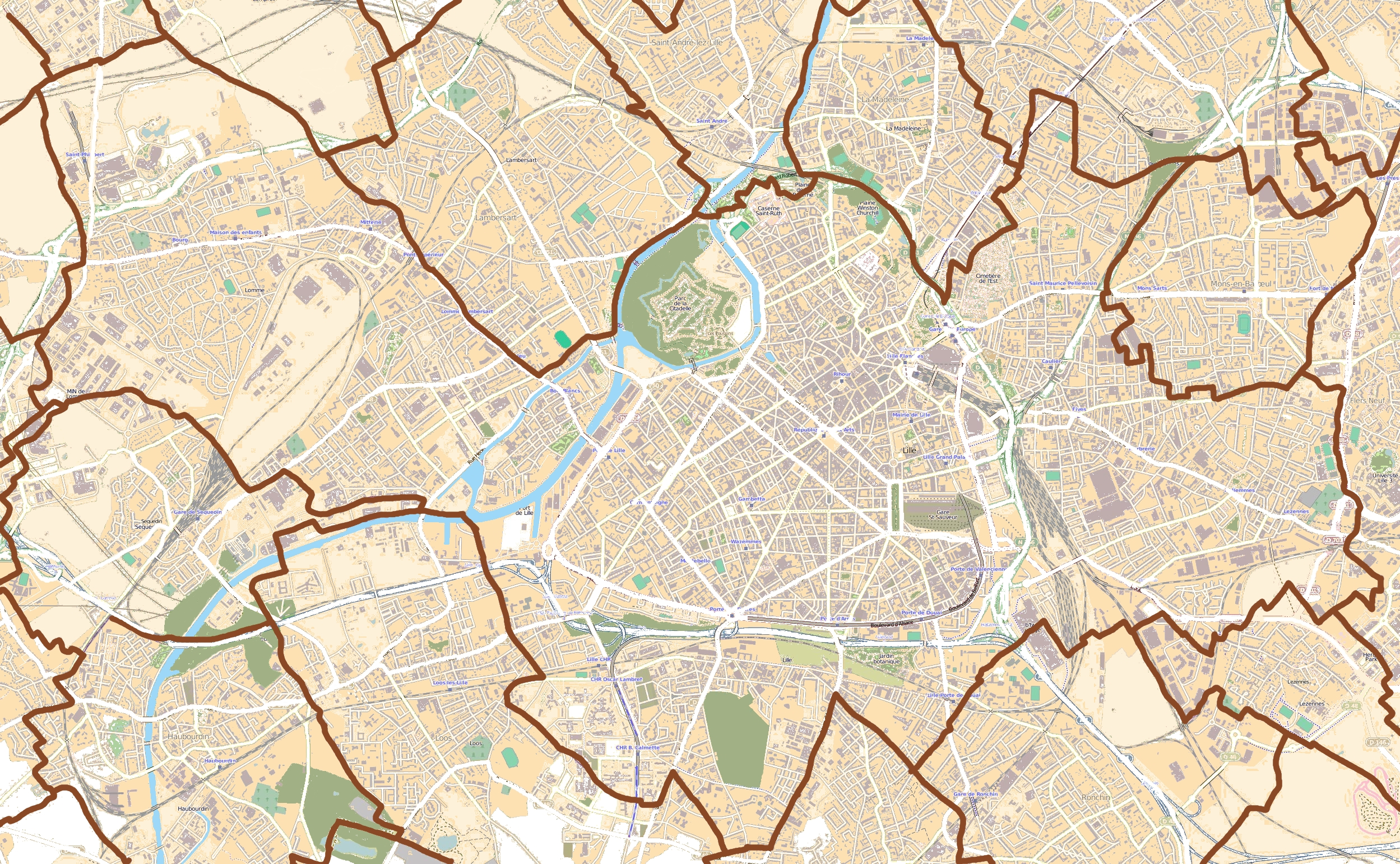
- Location of the synagogue in Lille, France

Religion
- Affiliation: Judaism
- Rite: Nusach Ashkenaz
- Ecclesiastical or organizational status: Synagogue
- Status: Active

Location
- Location: 5, rue Auguste Angellie, Lille, Hauts-de-France
- Country: France
- Interactive map of Lille Synagogue
- Coordinates: 50°37′42″N 3°03′55″E

Architecture
- Architect: Théophile-Albert Hannotin
- Type: Synagogue architecture
- Style: Romanesque Revival; Byzantine Revival
- Established: c. 1871 (as a congregation)
- Completed: 1891
- Materials: Stone

Monument historique
- Official name: Synagogue
- Type: Base Mérimée
- Designated: 13 September 1984
- Reference no.: PA00107727

Lille Synagogue (French: Synagogue de Lille) is a Jewish congregation and synagogue, located at 5, rue Auguste Angellier, in Lille, in the Hauts-de-France region of France. The congregation worships in the Ashkenazi rite.

== History ==
The Jewish presence in Lille began shortly after Alsace returned to German rule in 1871. Designed by the Lille architect, Théophile-Albert Hannotin, and built in an eclectic style described by a local professor as "romano-byzantin", now known as the Romanesque Revival and Byzantine Revival styles, and opened in 1891, it is the oldest synagogue in the department of Nord. It is one of few synagogues to have survived intact from the Nazi occupation of France, as the Nazis used it to store weapons. In 1984, the synagogue was listed as a monument historique.

It is owned by the city and operated by the local community. In January 2022, it reopened after three years of restorations, which were intended to bring its appearance back to how it looked when it opened. The initial budget for restorations was €1.5 million. In November 2018, to raise funds for the renovation and to educate the local community, it ran a mojito bar with guided tours.

== See also ==
- History of Lille
- History of the Jews in France
- List of synagogues in France
