= History of Lille =

Lille coat of arms.

The history of Lille dates back to the 11th century when Baudouin V of Flanders endowed the recently founded collegiate church of Saint-Pierre with a charter in 1066.

The city, capital of the Burgundian region, enjoyed a period of great influence and prosperity in the 15th century. Attached to the kingdom of France after Louis XIV's conquest in 1667, and enlarged by Vauban, the town suffocated in the mid-nineteenth century within its two-century-old ramparts, unsuited to the development of the large textile industry. In 1858, Napoleon III decided to annex the neighboring communes and extend the city walls. The two world wars were particularly painful ordeals. The Trente Glorieuses were a period of deindustrialization and reconversion to tertiary activities. The city's historic heritage, which had been neglected until the 1960s, was enhanced at the end of the 20th century.

== The site and emergence of the town ==
The town's name derives from a passage in the 1066 Charter of Endowment of the Collegiate Church of Saint-Pierre: "in loco progenitoribus Illa nominoto", in French "le lieu que nos aïeux appelaient Illa", our ancestors referring to the probable period of formation of the first urban nucleus, the castrum, around the year 1000.

In 1325 the most expensive "rentes" (royalties) paid by the people of Lille to the "Maison Saint-Nicolas" (hospice) for their homes were mainly located near the "Marché" (or forum or Grand Place) at the beginning of rue Grande-Chaussée. Prices fell as one approached the "Rivage" or "portus", the port of embarkation on the Basse-Deûle, no doubt because the land was more humid or subject to flooding, making it more difficult to build on. The wealthiest chose to live higher up, on the healthier chalk near the "Marché", and close to the Paris-Flanders road.

Until the digging of the "Canal de l'Esplanade" (or "Canal de la Moyenne-Deûle") in 1750, goods transported by water had to transit overland between the "Haute" and "Basse" Deûle. Historians and geographers have considered this break in the longitudinal slope, leading to port activity, to be a key factor in the town's development.

In addition, the configuration of the valley floor at this point makes it relatively easy to cross between the motte-and-bailey castle and the place known as Fins (the future parish of Saint-Maurice), where a session of the itinerant count's court was held in 875 and where the presence of a church, attesting to the presence of a settlement, is mentioned in the 1066 founding charter of the collegiate church of Saint-Pierre. The two opposite lower slopes were the first settlements mentioned in medieval texts in the 11th century. The toponymy insula (island) was born in this context. It refers either to the feudal motte surrounded by the Canal Saint-Pierre and the Canal du Cirque, or to a higher, drier islet in the center of the valley, used for crossing the valley (approximately at the site of the Opera house).

In the Middle Ages, these two traffic routes encouraged the urbanization of the "island" and its surroundings. The medieval town was criss-crossed by numerous canals. Some of these canals follow the ancient watercourses from which the town originated, but many are artificial, created by the ditches of successive enclosures or dug for specific needs. Subject to heavy silting and considered infectious agents, they were filled in or covered over during the 19th century. The charter consecrating the collegiate church of Saint-Pierre in 1066 is the oldest complete historical document. It was recently translated by Professor Stéphane Lebecq. This document attests to the existence of an incorporated town whose origins date back at least to around 1000.

== Middle Ages ==
From the 11th century onward Lille's cloth fair became increasingly renowned. In 1144, sources mentioned the "parish of Saint-Sauveur", which gave its name to the "Saint-Sauveur" district.

In 1213 the city was sacked and besieged by Philippe Auguste to punish the people of Lille for their betrayal of the Count of Flanders Ferrand.

The Counts of Flanders, Boulogne, and Hainaut, England and the Holy German Empire joined forces to wage war against France and its king Philippe Auguste. During this war, the French king Philippe Auguste defeated the Count of Flanders and the German Emperor Otto IV, ending with the French victory at Bouvines in 1214. Count Ferrand de Portugal was imprisoned and the county fell into disarray, with his wife Jeanne, Countess of Flanders and Constantinople, ruling the city. The countess was said to be much loved by the people of Lille.

In 1224, the hermit Bertrand de Rains, no doubt urged on by local lords, tried to pass himself off as Baudoin I of Constantinople, father of Jeanne de Flandre who had disappeared at the battle of Andrinople. He incites the counties of Flanders and Hainaut to sedition against Joan to regain her lands. She appealed to her cousin King Louis VIII the Lion. The latter unmasked the impostor, who was then hanged by Countess Jeanne. In 1226, the king agreed to release Ferrand de Portugal, who died in 1233, along with his daughter Marie, shortly afterward. In 1235, Jeanne granted a charter to the city of Lille, under which mayors and aldermen were chosen each All Saints' Day by four commissioners appointed by the sovereign. On February 6, 1236, she founded the Comtesse Hospital within the walls of her Lille palace, which remains one of the most beautiful buildings in Old Lille. It was in her honor that the maternity ward of Lille's regional university hospital was named the Jeanne-de-Flandre Hospital in the 20th century.

When the Countess died without issue in 1244 at the Abbey of the Rest of Notre-Dame de Marquette, the counties of Flanders and Hainaut passed to her sister Marguerite II de Flandre and then to Marguerite's son, Guy de Dampierre.

Following the victory of the Flemish militia at the Battle of the Golden Spurs in 1302, Lille in turn drove out the Leliaerts and joined its Flemish compatriots. Lille nevertheless came under French rule from 1304 to 1369, after the battle of Mons-en-Pévèle. Lille had a population of 10,000 around 1300.

The County of Flanders became part of the Duchy of Burgundy following the marriage in 1369 of Marguerite de Male, Countess of Flanders, to Philip II the Bold, Duke of Burgundy. In 1385, the Duke created the Council of Lille, comprising a Chamber of Accounts and a court of justice, the Conseil de Flandre. This sedentary council handled financial and judicial affairs for all the duke's territories except Burgundy. Later, John the Fearless moved the Council of Flanders to Ghent but kept the Chambre des Comptes in Lille, where it was responsible for the financial affairs of all territories except Brabant, Holland, Friesland, and Burgundy. Lille became one of the three capitals of the Burgundian duchy, along with Brussels and Dijon. Philip the Good, Duke of Burgundy and more powerful than the King of France, made Lille an administrative and financial capital. At that time, the population would have been in the region of 15,000 to 20,000.

On February 17, 1454, a year after the capture of Constantinople by the Turks, Philip the Good organized a pantagruelian banquet in his ducal palace in Lille, which became famous as the "Banquet of the Pheasant Vow". The duke and his retinue swore an oath on a trimmed pheasant to help Christendom.

In 1477, on the death of Charles the Bold, the last Duke of Burgundy, his heiress Mary of Burgundy married Maximilian of Austria, bringing the city to the Habsburgs, who thus took the title of Count of Flanders. In 1477, the Lille Chamber of Accounts was abolished. At the end of the reign of the German Emperor Charles V, known as Charles V, Spanish Flanders fell to his eldest son. Lille thus came under the control of Philip II of Spain, King of Spain. The city remained under Spanish rule until the reign of Philip IV of Spain.

== Modern times ==
=== The French conquest and the Ancien Régime ===
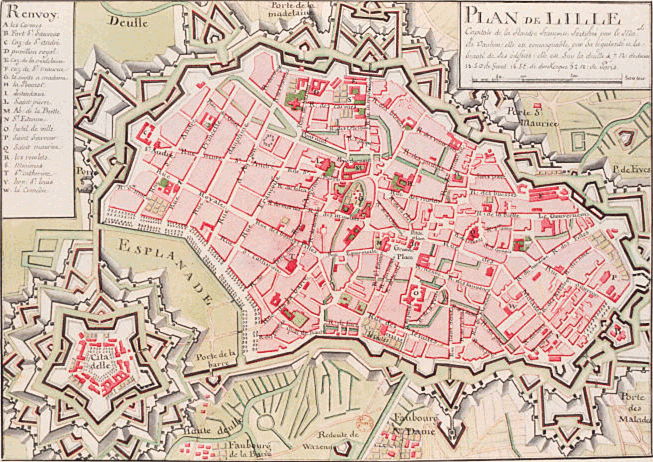
18th-century map of old Lille and the Vauban citadel.

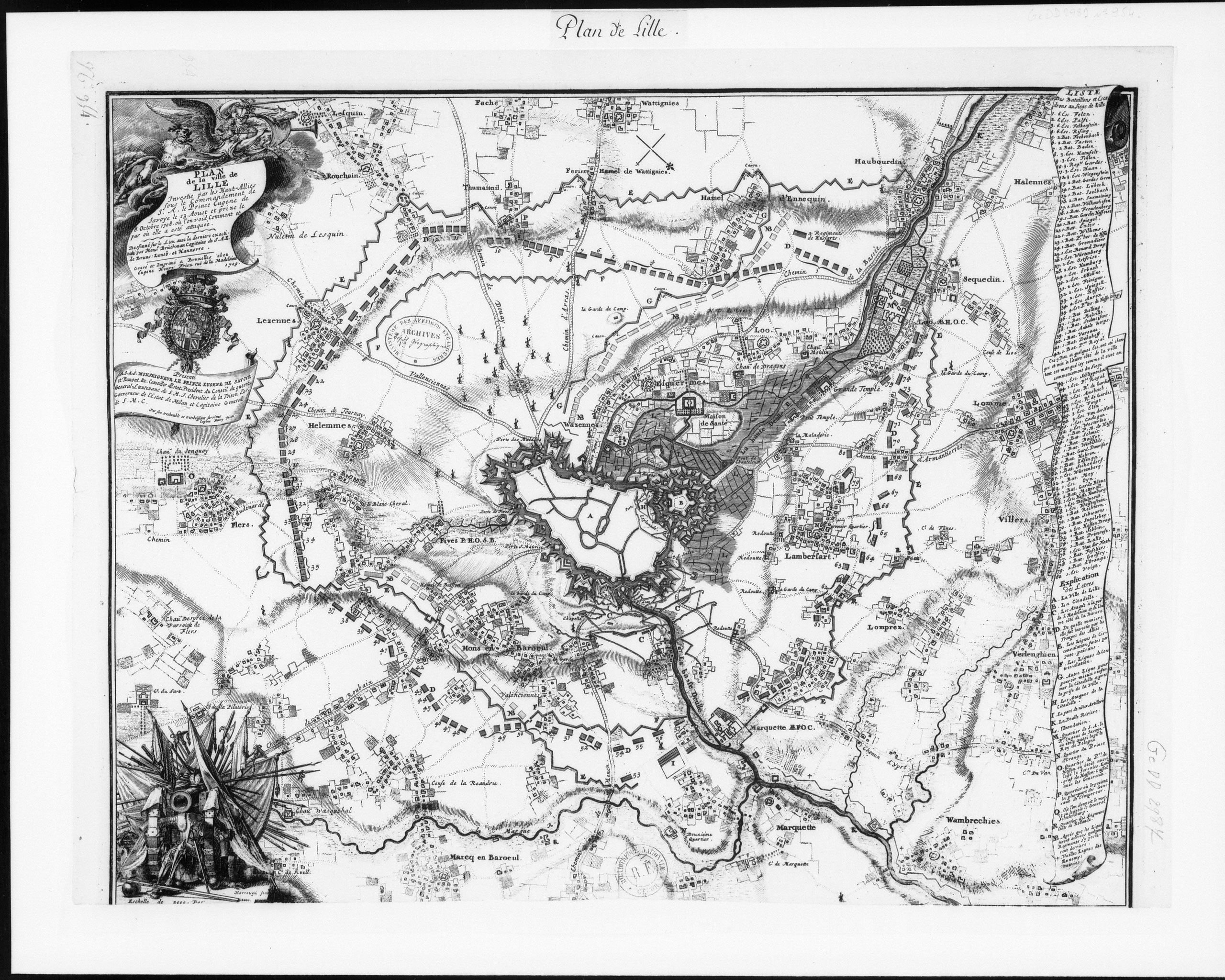
Map describing the siege and capture of the town (published in 1709 by Eugène-Henri Fricx).

In 1667, the city, once again rich and prosperous, was besieged and taken by Vauban in eight days (July 20–27) simultaneously with Douai under the eyes of the Sun King. Lille then became French on May 2, 1668, under the Treaty of Aix-la-Chapelle, which provoked the discontent of the people of Lille. In the same year, Vauban, appointed governor, improved and extended the city's fortifications, encompassing the new districts of Saint-André and La Madeleine to the northwest, as far as the Citadelle. The intramural area was thus increased from 142 to 206 hectares, to which were added 205 hectares of fortifications. These works won the confidence of the Flemish subjects. From April to December 1672, the King appointed D'Artagnan governor of the city, temporarily replacing Marshal d'Humières.

During the War of the Spanish Succession, which pitted France against the coalition of Great Britain, the United Provinces, Austria and Prussia, the fortified town was besieged in mid-August 1708 by the 75,000 men of the Duke of Marlborough and Prince Eugene of Savoy. The Lille garrison, commanded by Marshal de Boufflers, numbered 15,000 men. At the end of October, Boufflers was forced to abandon the city, retreating with 5,000 men to the Vauban citadel. He finally surrendered in early December. The city was then occupied for five years by coalition troops. Lille was returned to France when peace was signed in Utrecht on April 11, 1713.

During the 18th century, the Age of Enlightenment, Lille remained deeply Catholic.

== The French Revolution ==
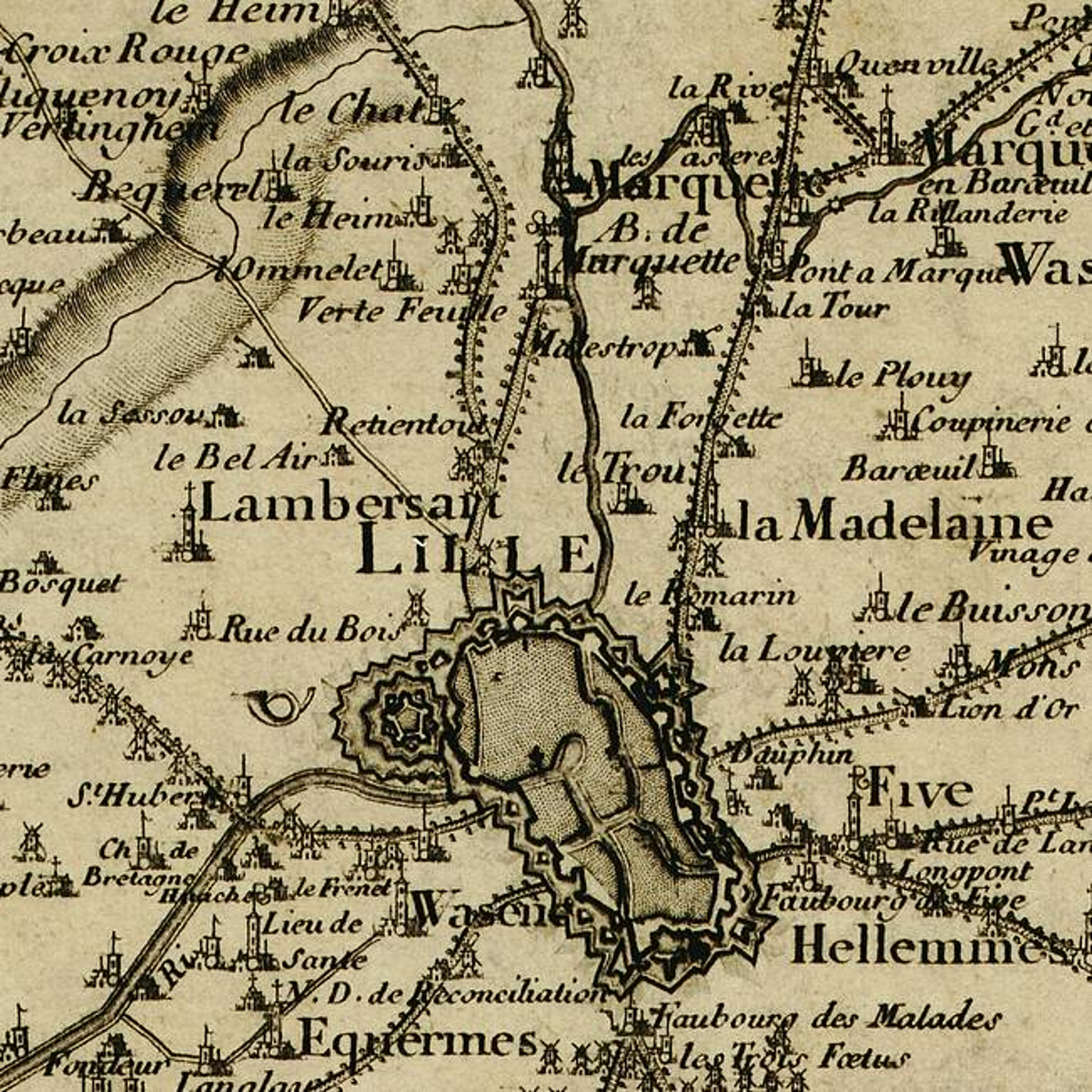
18th-century map of old Lille and the surrounding area.

In 1789, the town suffered riots and the destruction of several religious establishments, notably the collegiate church of Saint-Pierre. In 1790, the first elected municipality was set up, replacing the old municipal administration, the Magistrat, which dated back to the Middle Ages. In 1792, the French Revolution prompted the Austrians, then present in the United Provinces, to lay siege to Lille on April 20, until a truce on May 18. A new siege began in the autumn, accompanied by a bombardment that lasted from September 29 to October 3. Faced with resistance from the people of Lille, led by their mayor François André, and pressure from the revolutionary armies, Albert de Saxe-Teschen lifted the siege on October 8. This bombardment is depicted by the painter Louis Joseph Watteau, in a painting kept by the Lille Museum, entitled "Tableau du Bombardement de Lille en 1792" (Painting of the Bombardment of Lille in 1792), which shows the flooding of the Wazemmes sector from the Haute-Deûle and "la lunette de Fives formée par la Chaude-Rivière" (the Fives lunette formed by the Chaude-Rivière), caused to protect the city from the Austrians.

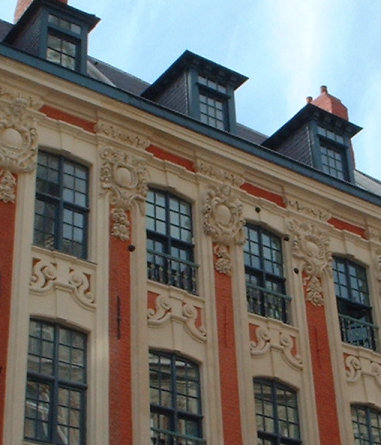
Dummy cannonballs on the facades of the Place du Théâtre in Lille.

On October 12, 1792, the National Convention unanimously decreed that "Lille has well deserved its fatherland". To celebrate the city's resistance, the inhabitants placed dummy cannonballs on certain facades (notably in the facades of the "rang du beau regard"), around the "place du théâtre". Similarly, the "Column of the Goddess", originally sculpted to appear on the Arc de Triomphe de l'Étoile, was erected in 1845 on the "Grand'Place" to commemorate the event.

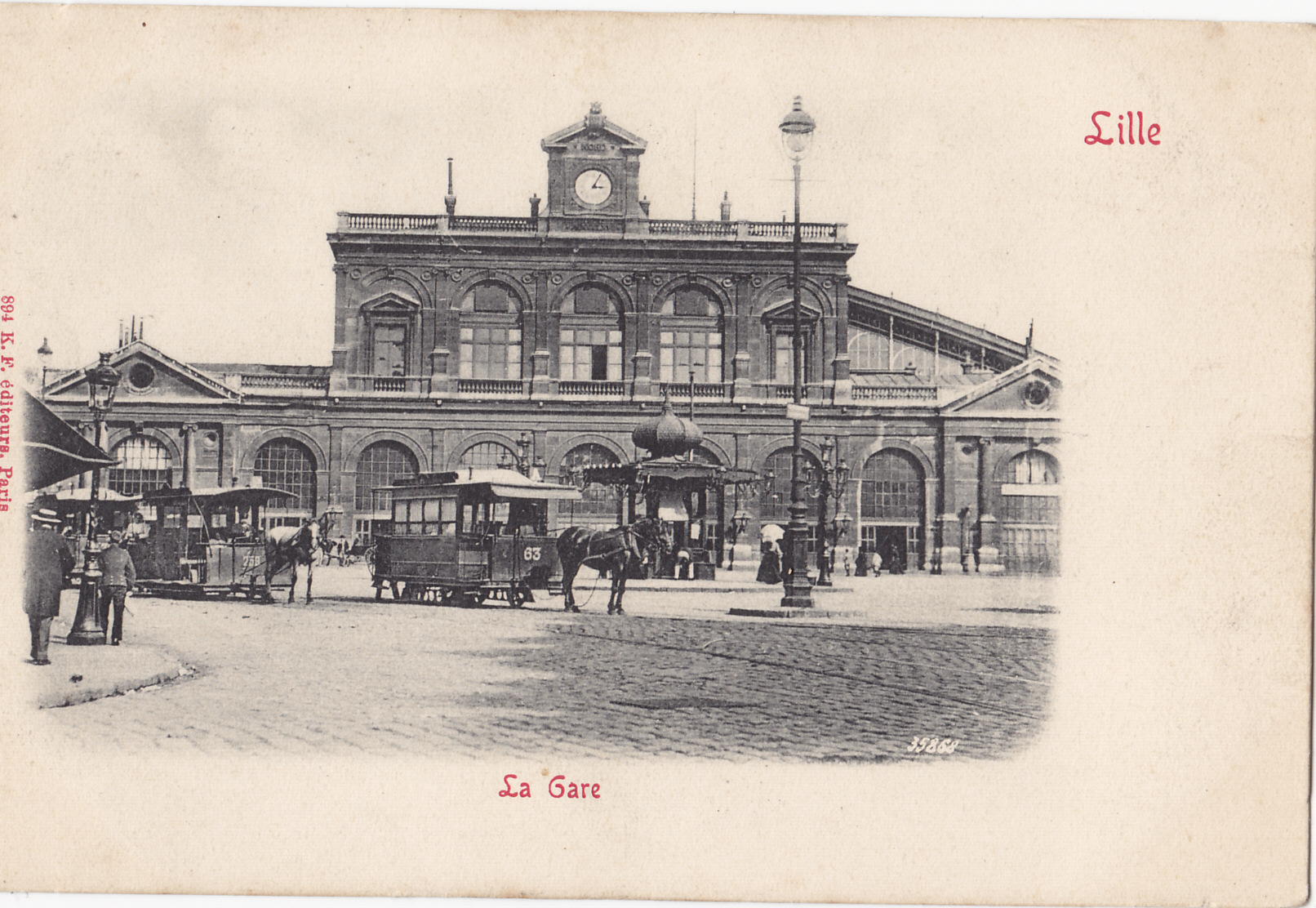
Today's Lille-Flandres railway station, built in 1867 to replace the station built in 1848. This early 20th-century postcard shows horse-drawn streetcars belonging to the Tramways du Département du Nord company.

The implementation of the republican calendar, which came into force in October 1793, was not self-evident among Catholics: the Société Populaire de Lille (Lille People's Society) struggled to cope with the fact that the people of Lille stopped working on Sundays (in the republican calendar, the day of rest is the decadi), and even celebrated the day. On Frimaire 18, Year II (December 8, 1793), she asked the municipality to stop dancing on "the old Sundays". On 7 Pluviose An II (January 26, 1794), she protested against teachers who gave their pupils the day off "on the former Sundays and feast days". Protestants in Lille, on the other hand, had no difficulty in adopting the new rhythm of life and held their assemblies and worship services on decadi instead of Sundays.

== The 19th century ==
The town continued to grow, and by 1800 had 53,000 inhabitants. It became the capital of the Nord department in 1804 and developed its public education system on Rue des Arts.

In the early 19th century Napoleon I's continental blockade of the United Kingdom enabled the region to further develop its textile industry. Lille worked with cotton, and the nearby towns of Roubaix and Tourcoing with wool.

In 1815, Lille had three Masonic lodges: Les Amis-Réunis, La Fidélité and La Modeste. In 1817, the stagecoach that left Lille for Tourcoing at 5pm returned the next morning at 10am. The journey from Lille to Paris took 48 hours, and 20 hours in 1848.

Between 1802 and 1803, Lille was at the center of a network of stagecoaches and other outward and return services linking the city to various destinations, including a daily stagecoach to Paris. There was also a daily stage to Valenciennes, another to Béthune, one to Ypres and one to Ghent. To Dunkirk, a stagecoach on odd-numbered days is supplemented by a daily sedan and cabriolet. Tournai is linked by three stagecoaches, one every day, one on odd-numbered days, and one on even-numbered days. A single carriage goes to Menin on any day. Antwerp is reached by a stagecoach and a sedan every day, via Brussels. Two daily stagecoaches go to Douai, one in the morning and the other in the afternoon, supplemented by a daily boat. To Paris, there was also a Post Office stagecoach every other day, and a courier service every other day.

At the time of the 1827 crisis, the town had 31,600 destitute out of a population of 70,000. The following year, there were 113 mutual aid societies, often named after Catholic saints. Industry was developing in Lille, but some production was carried out at home by craftsmen living in squalid conditions. In 1828, more than 3,600 lived in cellars.

In 1858, an imperial decree annexed the neighboring communes of Fives, Wazemmes, Moulins, and Esquermes to Lille. Lille had 158,000 inhabitants in 1872, over 200,000 in 1891, and 217,000 in 1912. In 1896, Gustave Delory became the first socialist mayor of a major French city, following Roubaix in 1892. The city was in the midst of the Industrial Revolution. Thanks in particular to the steam engine and mechanical looms, the city became opulent.

At the end of the 19th century public transport was provided by the tramway, Lille's old network, first horse-drawn in 1874 (a decree of August 1900 abolished horse-drawn transport), then steam-powered, not only to link Lille to Roubaix and Tourcoing, but also to provide various routes within Lille and to neighboring towns. The "steam car", which came into service in 1881, was a step forward in terms of passenger numbers, but had its drawbacks: it was noisy, gave off a lot of smoke and used incandescent coal, fragments of which sometimes escaped from the chimneys, risking fires and/or burning the horses' legs. At the beginning of the 20th century, essential developments took place: electrification, the construction of the Grand Boulevard, and the introduction of the Grand Boulevard tramway in 1909.

In 1900, the town was awarded the Légion d'honneur for its performance during the siege of 1792.

The faculties of literature, science, medicine and law were created in the 1880s between rue Jean-Bart and rue Jeanne-d'Arc, forming the University of Lille at the same time as the Catholic University built in the Vauban district.

In 1901, Charles Debierre, deputy mayor for public education, presided over an association of "friends of the people" who wanted to give everyone access to culture, at a time when the little people were gaining access to school thanks to the Jules Ferry laws: the Université populaire de Lille was created. On Sunday mornings, during mass, it organized high-level lectures open to a wide audience.

However, on the eve of the First World War, the people were more likely to enjoy their hard lives in the estaminets, where they could relax, meet up with friends, sing patois refrains and play a variety of games, such as jeu du beigneau (throwing shuffles into a hole), jeu du bouchon (knocking down corks 9 meters apart), skittles, darts, and strength competitions. In 1882, Lille had 360 drinking establishments, rising to 3979 in 1911.

== The First World War ==
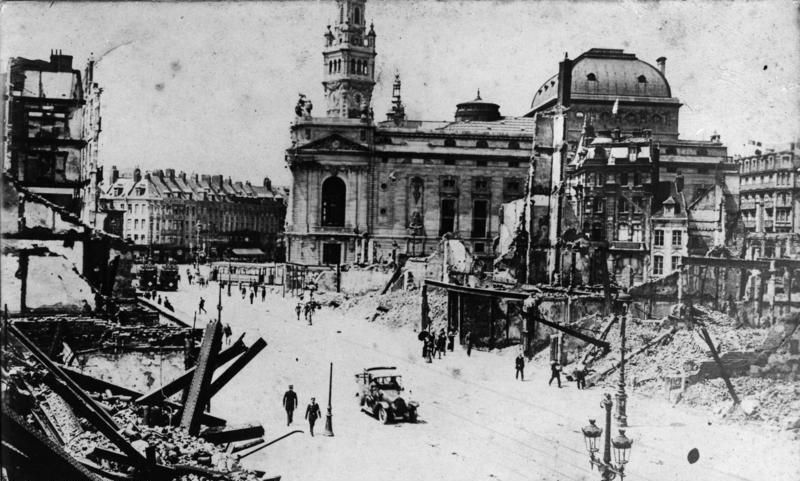
The top of rue Faidherbe, opposite the station, in 1916.

Lille was declared an "open city" on August 1, 1914, and evacuated by the General Staff on August 24. The city regained its strategic importance with the "Race to the Sea" and was reoccupied by the French army on October 3. The siege of the town was marked by an intense bombardment from October 11 to 12, which destroyed a large part of the station district. During the German occupation, which lasted from October 12, 1914, to October 17, 1918, the people of Lille suffered many atrocities.

This period was marked by the resistance of strong personalities such as Louise de Bettignies and Léon Trulin. During the siege of 1914, Louise de Bettignies, who spoke four languages including German and English, shuttled ammunition and food to the soldiers who were still firing on the besiegers. In makeshift hospitals, she wrote letters in German dictated by dying Germans for their families. In 1915, she built the most extensive and effective intelligence network of the entire war for the British services, covering 40 km of frontline behind the German lines around Lille. It employed over 100 people from all walks of life in the Nord department. In February 1915, she was responsible for the first aerial bombing of a train carrying the Kaiser on a secret visit to Lille. Its last message, before being arrested in Tournai in September 1915, was to announce the preparation of the German offensive on Verdun for early 1916, information considered absurd by the French general staff.

Alongside these heroic acts, several convictions handed down by the German authorities illustrate the day-to-day resistance put up by the people of Lille to this enemy stranglehold: selling or distributing textiles bearing the national colors of states opposed to Germany, throwing cigarettes at passing prisoners, insulting French women working for the occupying forces, possessing texts hostile to Germany, a Teutonic soldier called "dirty boche". In June 1915, shoemaker Jacoby was executed for urging workers not to make bags for the Germans. In September 1915, four resistance fighters (Camille Jacquet, Ernest Deconninck, Georges Maertens, Sylvère Verhulst) who had helped British and French soldiers were shot in Lille.

On the night of January 11, 1916, the "eighteen bridges ammunition depot" exploded on Boulevard de Belfort. The huge explosion was heard as far away as the center of the Netherlands. It blew through the Moulins district, destroying around twenty factories and hundreds of houses, killing 104 civilians, and injuring several hundred more. A cloud of mercury vapour is thought to have polluted the area beneath the blast's fallout. It is not known whether sabotage or an accident caused the explosion.

At the end of March 1916, Lille was visited by Herbert Hoover, future President of the United States and founder of the Hispano-American Committee, which was in charge of finding, purchasing, and transporting food for the population of the occupied zone, a vital aid due to the state of restrictions and shortages then being experienced. In June 1916, the people of Lille were obliged to bring their dogs to the Palais Rameau. Their fat was used to make chips.

The region endured a very difficult occupation, which took a heavy toll on women, children, and the elderly, as most middle-aged men were mobilized. One of the peaks of this complicated period in Lille was reached around Easter 1916 when thousands of women and girls were abducted and deported. The operation was carried out in retaliation for the difficulties encountered by the Germans during their offensive on Verdun.

By February 1918, Lille's population had fallen from 217,807 on the eve of the war to 112,000. Doctor Albert Calmette was one of those who sounded the alarm: the mortality rate had risen to 41.55% from 20.65%, and tuberculosis was wreaking havoc (rate up from 3.05 to 5.73). Two figures sum up Lille's situation during the First World War: 8,534 births took place for 22,911 deaths.

The city was liberated without resistance on October 17, 1918 by General William Birdwood's British troops, welcomed by a jubilant Lille crowd. On October 28, General Birdwood was made an honorary citizen of Lille.

== The Roaring Twenties, the Depression and the Popular Front ==
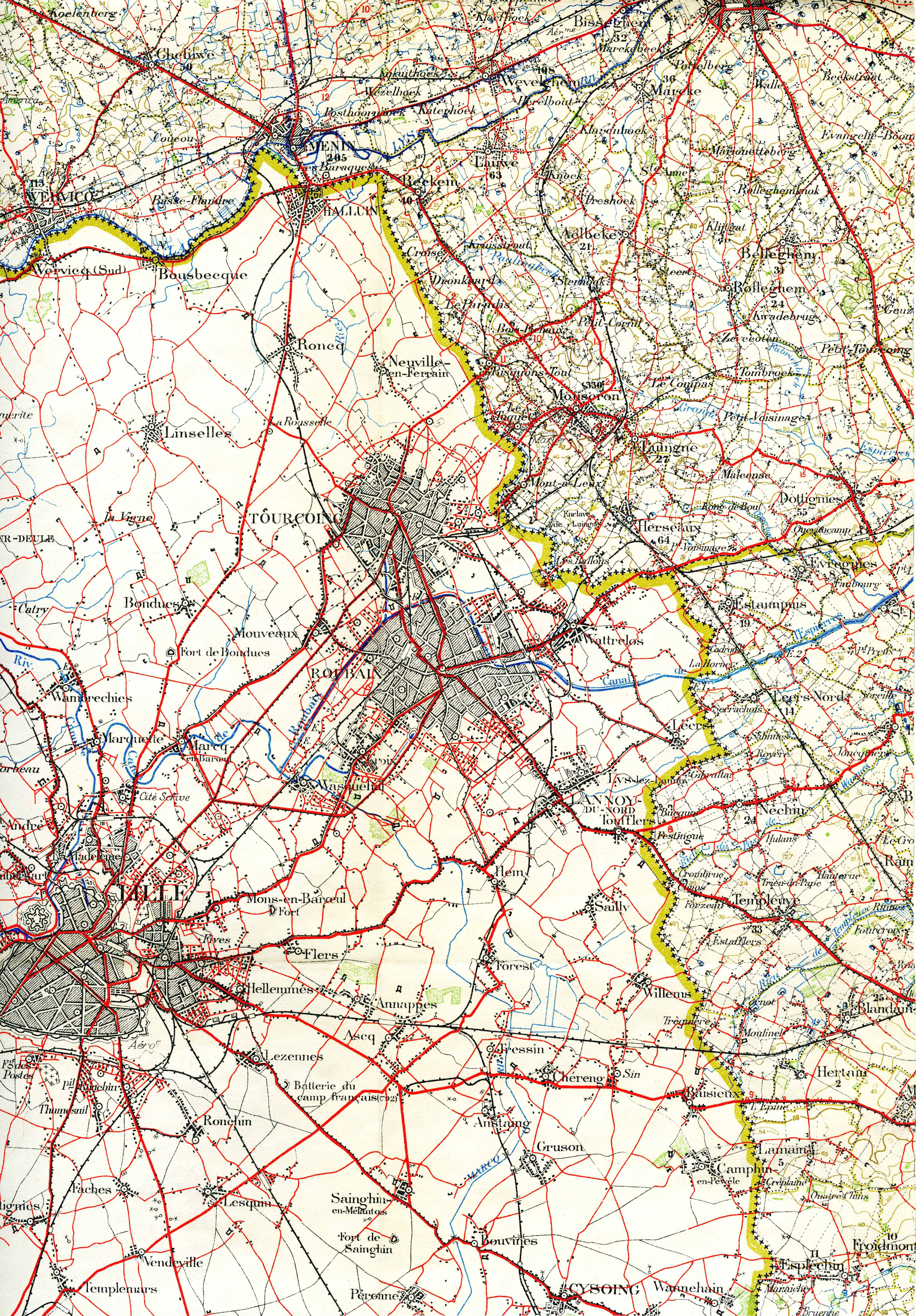
Map of Lille and surrounding area in 1922. The great urbanization between the cities had not yet taken place.

Of a total of 34,200 houses in 1914, 12,200 had been destroyed by the time of liberation, mainly as a result of the bombardments of the 1914 siege and the explosion of the eighteen bridges.

In addition, the decommissioning of the fortifications in 1919 made vast tracts of military land available.

This situation gave rise to several urban planning projects for the center and outskirts of the city, including the replacement of the terminus station with a through station at Fives, the demolition of the insalubrious Saint-Sauveur district to be replaced by wide lanes lined with new buildings, and the creation of a vast park and garden city in Flers, halfway between Lille and Roubaix-Tourcoing. The urban development projects undertaken in the 1920s were limited by the economic difficulties of the 1930s.

In July 1921 at the Pasteur Institute in Lille, Albert Calmette and Camille Guérin developed the anti-tuberculosis vaccine known as BCG.

On April 10–26, 1925 the first Lille Trade Fair was held, organized by many entrepreneurs and Lille mayor Roger Salengro to develop the potential of Lille, "France's third-largest city, ideally placed at the center of major French industry". The first fair, held on boulevard des Écoles (now boulevard Jean-Baptiste Lebas), was a success. It included a circus and bandstand, and admission was free except on the last day when you had to pay 2 francs. The fair brought together 400 exhibitors, showcasing the latest innovations (washing machines, cars, etc.), and didn't forget to celebrate close neighbors with a Franco-Belgian day marked by visits from the burgomasters of Tournai and Ypres. The 1926 version confirmed this success, with 800,000 visitors, a Luxembourg day, and a British day. It was repeated each year with specific vintages, such as the 1929 Exposition du progrès social organized with Roubaix, Lille erected a building to house the 1933 International Specialized Fair. In 1951, the building was refurbished to host the International Textile Exhibition. The structure (245,000 m² in its final years) disappeared from view in 1993 and was succeeded by the Lille Grand Palais in its immediate vicinity.

On March 21, 1926, Lille gave an enthusiastic welcome to the Queen of the Belgians, Elisabeth of Bavaria, who had been honored for her exemplary behavior during the First World War. She presided over the solemn session of the Institute of Social Sciences and was made an honorary doctor.

On June 10, 1926, with the Cartel des Gauches in government, and contrary to a general trend towards appeasement after the First World War, Mayor Roger Salengro was accused by some of reviving the religious quarrel by reminding members of the clergy, based on an 1880 decree, that "processions on the public highway" were forbidden.

Between the wars, the most popular regional sporting event was the swim across Lille. On August 25, 1928, 157 competitors took part in the 15th edition.

By 1931, Lille was suffering the repercussions of the 1929 crisis, and by 1935 a third of the population was living in poverty. In 1932, the Hôtel de Ville was completed.

The crisis of February 6, 1934 (an anti-parliamentary demonstration), was not confined to Paris: brawls also took place in Lille on the main square and in nearby streets. On July 13, 1935, the municipality, headed by Roger Salengro, organized a "Popular Front" procession in conjunction with other municipalities in the Lille suburbs, and with socialist and far-left workers' and political organizations.

Roger Salengro strengthened the work of the municipal charity office, which was virtually the only organization to help people unable to work (the elderly, the unemployed, the disabled, and the sick). He played a key role in improving traffic flow in Lille, by enlarging the main boulevard, installing signposts, one-way streets, traffic lights, crosswalks, etc. In 1936, Roger Salengro became Minister of the Interior for the Popular Front, and committed suicide in the wake of slander directed against him by extreme right-wing circles.

In this border town the conclusion of the Munich Agreement at the end of September 1938 brought relief and profound joy: in the days that followed, the town council named one of the city's streets after Neville-Chamberlain.

In 1939, the "Social Progress" exhibition was held in Roubaix and Lille, organized by the association of mayors of the Nord et de l'Est region, to show that twenty years after the end of the First World War, industrial and social renewal was well underway. The event was inaugurated on May 14 by Trade Minister Fernand Gentin, before welcoming French President Albert Lebrun on June 5, who was greeted by a huge crowd. This clear commitment to the future was a great success, and for several months led to a succession of joyous events (concerts, conferences, etc.). The declaration of war on September 3, 1939, brought a premature end to the exhibition and the hope it had sought to represent.

In 1939, Lille had twenty-seven cinemas with a capacity for 18,700 spectators.

== World War II ==
As soon as war was declared on Germany on September 3, 1939, preparations were made for the conflict, and the displacement of Lille's population began: 1,500 people on September 11, and 1,200 on September 12, left Lille for the Montreuil region in the Pas-de-Calais; on September 27, the municipality distributed the first gas masks in the Fives and Saint-Maurice districts.

The pocket of Lille was taken by the Germans on May 31, 1940, after heroic resistance by General Molinié's group. The Germans were impressed and honored them on the Grand Place on June 1.

As soon as Belgium was invaded, the people of Lille, still scarred by the First World War, fled in large numbers. Lille, in the zone attached to the German command in Brussels, was never part of the Vichy government. Most of the Nord and Pas-de-Calais regions were liberated in the five days from September 1 to 5, 1944, by British, French, Canadian, and Polish troops, except the coast, especially Dunkirk, which was one of the last towns in France to be liberated. On September 3, German troops began to leave the city to avoid being encircled by British troops already on their way to Brussels. The Lille resistance recaptured part of the city in furious fighting between routed Germans, beginning with the insurrection order issued on September 2. The resistance seized the main administrative headquarters and attacked the retreating German troops. Then, in a daring coup de main, three groups of police students led by Lieutenant Basseux took the citadel, taking over 300 prisoners. They seized a large amount of equipment, enabling the resistance to continue fighting against the German columns, which managed to penetrate as far as the post office. At around 5 p.m. on September 3, 1944, the British tanks triumphantly entered Lille, which had already been partially liberated. The last exchange of fire took place on September 4, south of Lille, in the village of Noyelles-lès-Seclin, under the threat of the last irreducible square: a company of SS having forced the Wehrmacht elements (who wanted to flee to Belgium) from the fort of Seclin to hold a position in the woods of Emmerin. The concentration of German artillery and ammunition led to the destruction of two British tanks between Noyelles and Houplin Ancoisne. A 3rd tank narrowly avoided the same fate, thanks to an English-speaking villager who was able to hide behind the small Noyelles church and destroy the entire German position with a series of shells aimed at the Emmerin woods, triggering an explosion in ammunition stocks. Rationing ended in 1947, and supplies did not return to normal until 1948. Lille was awarded the Croix de Guerre 1939–1945 on October 10, 1949.

== From the post-war years to the present ==
In 1947, Lille-Lesquin Airport was opened to civil and commercial air traffic (until then, it had been a military airport). Initially limited, traffic grew steadily, particularly from the 1960s onwards.

On April 3, 1927, during a visit by French President Gaston Doumergue to inaugurate the trade fair in Lille, radio made its debut as the first provincial transmitter. On April 25, 1950, regional television made its debut in a studio on top of Lille's belfry. Initially, Télé-Lille broadcasts live for two hours a day.

In the early 1950s, the construction of the new boulevard, avenue du président Hoover, further opened up the city of Lille, giving it a new grand entrance. The avenue links the city to the A1 Paris-Lille freeway and will become a section of the Lille ring road.

In 1957, a traditional local event – it has been going on since 1830 – the annual flower market organized in the heart of Lille by the Société horticole du Nord, set Lille abuzz: Queen Elizabeth II of England made her first official visit to France, four years after her coronation, from April 8 to 11, 1957. The royal couple have booked their last day in the Nord region. The program included a reception at the Hôtel de Ville, lunch at the Préfecture, where the couple was honored with a Flemish cheer, and a visit to Roubaix, including a tour of the large La Lainière textile factory in Roubaix, then considered the "wool capital of the world". But it seems that the Queen's main reason for coming to Lille was to see the city's flower market, on the recommendation of her cousin, former Belgian Queen Elisabeth. The city's pomp and splendor were on display to welcome the sovereigns, with 150,000 people lining the route of the procession, nearly twenty official cars between Lesquin and Lille, and 12,000 people in Lille itself. For the only time in its history, the flower market was moved to coincide with the dates of the royal visit: traditionally held from the last Wednesday in April, it was brought forward to April 11.
