= Hôtel de Ville, Lille =

Historic building and UNESCO World Heritage Site in Lille, France

Hôtel de Ville
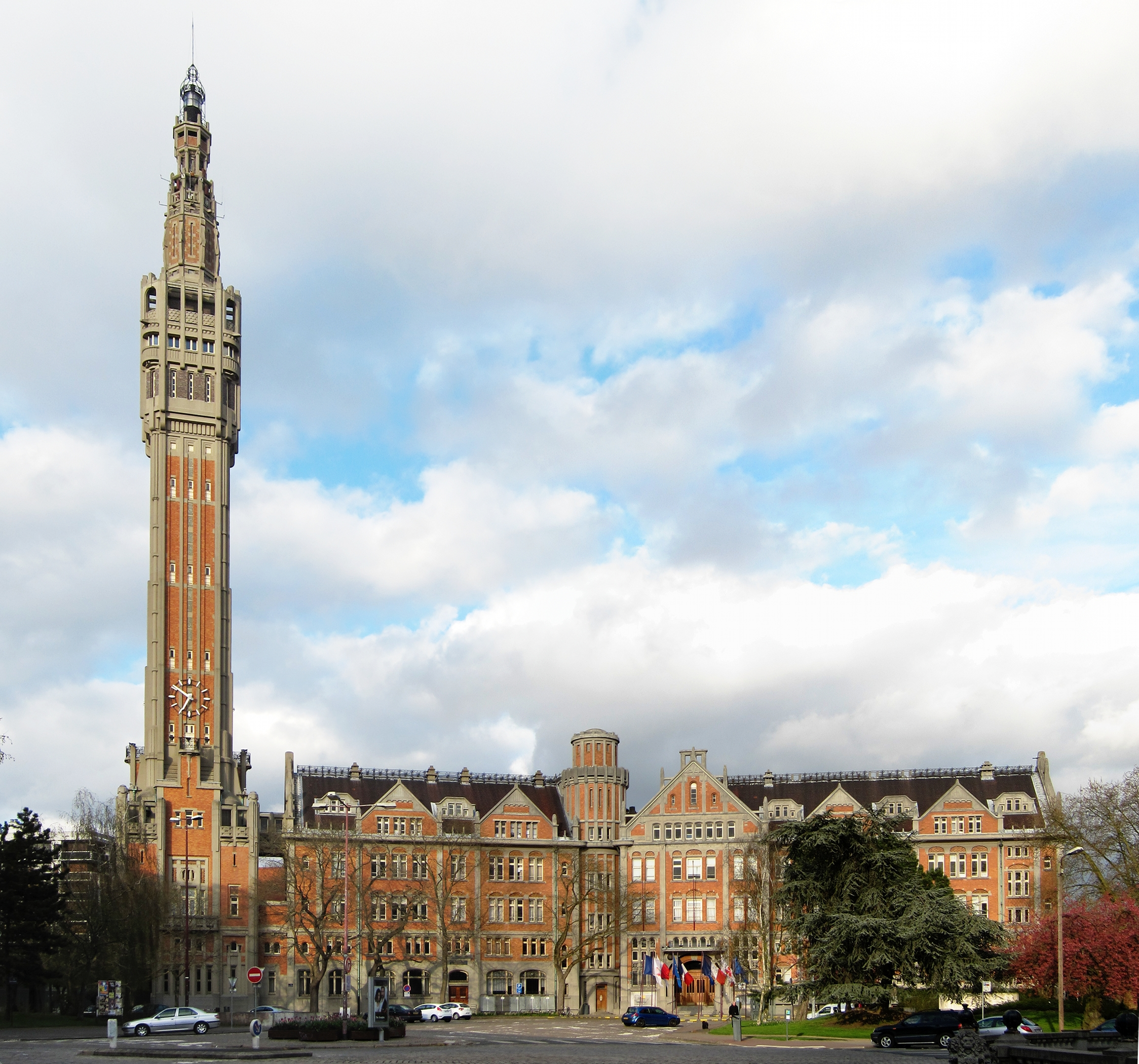
- The main frontage of the Hôtel de Ville in April 2012

General information
- Type: City hall
- Architectural style: Flemish Renaissance Revival style
- Location: Lille, France
- Coordinates: 50°37′50″N 3°04′16″E
- Completed: 1932

Height
- Height: 104 metres (341 ft)

Design and construction
- Architects: Émile Dubuisson

UNESCO World Heritage Site
- Part of: Belfries of Belgium and France
- Criteria: Cultural: ii, iv
- Reference: 943
- Inscription: 1999 (23rd Session)

Monument historique
- Official name: Hôtel de ville
- Type: Inscrit
- Designated: 2002
- Reference no.: PA59000078

The Hôtel de Ville (French pronunciation: [otɛl də vil], City Hall) is a municipal building in Lille, France. Built between 1924 and 1932 in Art Deco style of Flemish neo-Renaissance inspiration, it was designated a Monument historique by the French Government in May 2002. Its belfry is a UNESCO World Heritage Site, inscribed in 2005 along with many other Belfries of Belgium and France in recognition of its architecture and importance in the history of municipal power in Europe. The latter should not be confused with the belfry of Lille's Chamber of Commerce, also emblematic of the city.

The Town Hall is located on the Place Roger Salengro, next to the Porte de Paris, in the eastern part of the city centre. This site is served by the Mairie de Lille metro station on line 2 of the Lille Metro.

== History ==
At the beginning of the 20th century, Lille's Town Hall was located on the Place Rihour. It had been built by the architect Charles Benvignat between 1847 and 1859, on the site of the Palais Rihour, the former residence of the Dukes of Burgundy. This first Town Hall having been destroyed by an accidental fire in 1916, the question of the construction of a new one at the end of the First World War arose in the broader context of the town's reconstruction. The new socialist municipality led by Gustave Delory decided not to rebuild the destroyed building, but to erect a new one, as a symbol of a new era for the city. A competition for ideas to develop the city was launched in 1920 and the construction of the new Town Hall was finally entrusted to the architect Émile Dubuisson.

The site, chosen in favour of the downgrading of the military fortifications pronounced in 1919, was located on the Square Ruault, in the working class district of Saint-Sauveur, then out of the way and particularly marked by the industrial habitat of the 19th century. Dubuisson's project provided for a complete overhaul of the district, which was dilapidated and unhealthy, and in particular the drilling of new paths of Haussmann-esque inspiration. The building site, started in 1924, continued under the mandate of Roger Salengro, mayor of Lille from 1925, who decided to add a belfry. The construction of the belfry, the first reinforced concrete building over 100 meters high in France, was built in two stages, from 1929 to 1931. It ended in 1932 with its inauguration.

During the Second World War, the French Forces of the Interior seized the town hall and chamber of commerce, both of which had been used as German headquarters during their occupation, on 2 September 1944. The liberation of the town was then completed with the support of troops of the British Second Army, commanded by Lieutenant General Miles Dempsey, on 3 September 1944. Queen Elizabeth II visited the Town Hall and received full civic honours on 11 April 1957.

The initial project formed by Dubuisson was only partially realised. The war reparations supposed to finance the reconstruction dried up quickly, the development of the district did not materialise, and of the three wings planned for the Town Hall, only two were built. The construction of the current Town Hall was only truly completed in 1992, after the completion of the extension to the north of the original construction based on plans by Jean Pattou's Tandem+ architectural firm.

During the student protests in October 2026, the town hall was attacked by protesters, who damaged the premises before being removed by security forces.

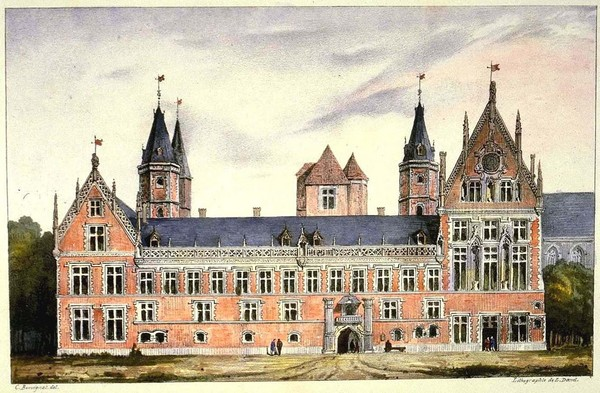
Palais Rihour, c. 1660

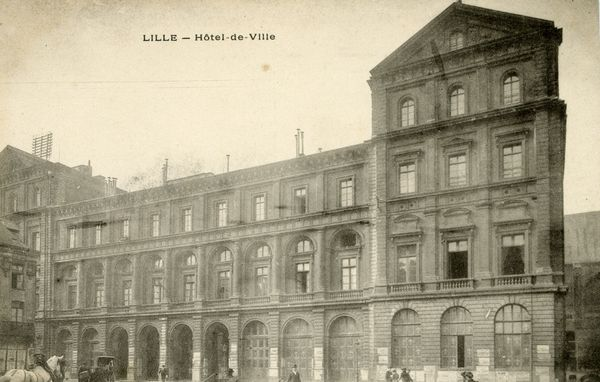
Lille's old Town Hall

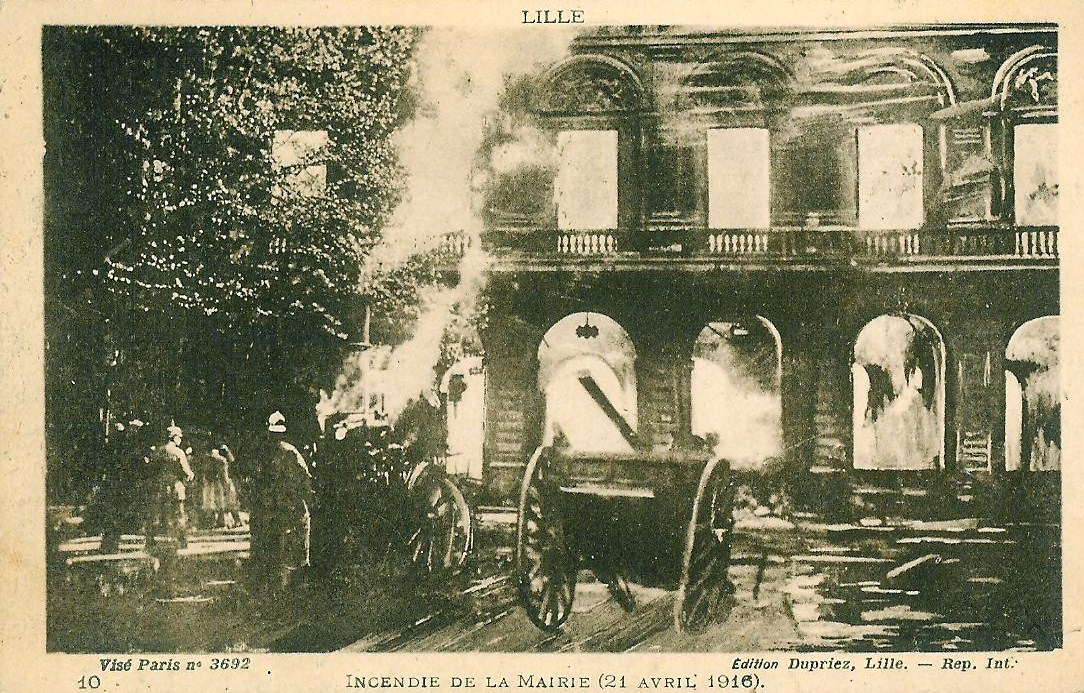
Fire in the old Town Hall, 21 April 1916

== Description ==
The building is constructed of concrete, brick, Béthisy stone and glazed ceramic. Its polychrome facade, with mullioned or basket-handle openings evoking Flemish houses, and with imposing triangular gables bristling with ears of corn, is of Flemish neo-Renaissance inspiration, but fully transcribed in the Art Deco style of the time. This local variant of Art Deco is often referred to as "Regionalist Art Deco".

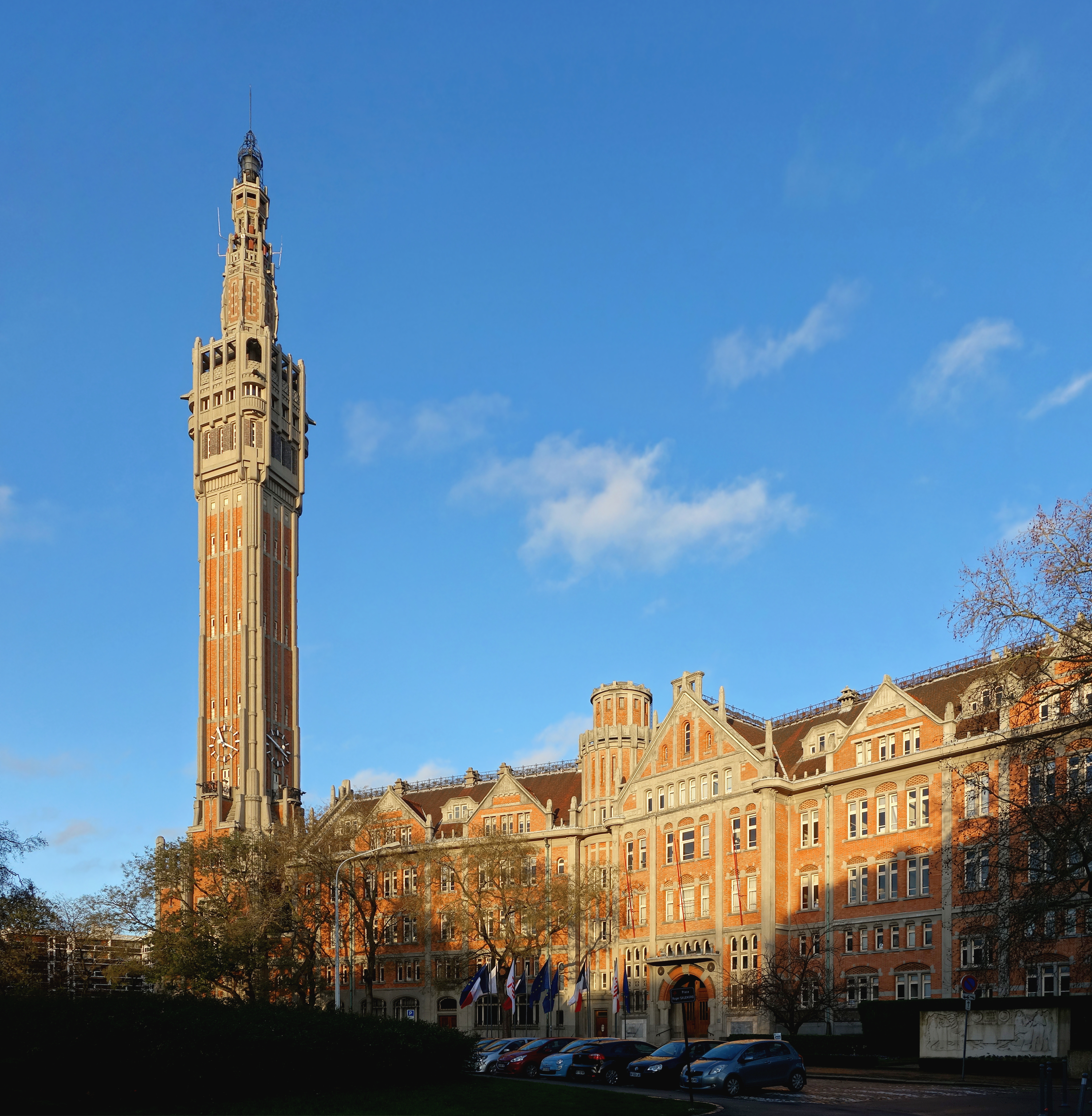
Main facade and belfry

At the corner stands the Belfry of Lille. It is the most recent and tallest belfry in Flanders, made entirely of reinforced concrete with brick facings. With its 104 metres (341 ft) and 400 steps to reach the top, it is also the tallest municipal building in France. Its look is inspired by the shape of a "Lilloise span" that can be seen on the 17th century houses in old Lille, as well as on the Chamber of Commerce previously built in the neo-Lille style. It has at its base two concrete statues of the giants Lydéric and Phinaert, founders of the city according to legend, made with bare hands in fresh concrete by Carlo Sarrabezolles.

The interior gallery, divided into three naves by two rows of 21 pillars with floral motifs, is 143 metres (469 ft) long. The capitals of the concrete pillars have been cast in aluminium shapes while their base is dressed in marble and wrought iron decoration. This gallery forms a municipal street which opens onto four transverse buildings housing the service offices on three levels. Three halls with openwork ceilings separate them. The two extremes are surrounded by counters for the reception of the public while the Central Hall accommodates the Council Chamber.

Two staircases of honour, starting from the gallery, also serve the first floor which notably includes the Wedding Room, the Witness Room, the Erro Room, the Committee Room, the Hall of honour and the office of Roger Salengro, equipped with their period furniture. In tribute to Salengro, driven to suicide in 1936, his office has remained unoccupied since then, with current mayors occupying the deputy's office. Everywhere in the decoration, including on the furniture, can the fleur-de-lys of Lille's coat of arms be found, as often the case on many municipal buildings of that period.

Only the administrative wing and that of the belfry were completed at the turn of the 1930s. The reception wing, which was to include a Hall of honour and a Party Room, was never completed. The last wing, which closes the quadrilateral formed by the general plan of the building, is of modern design. Built in the early 1990s, it includes the Town Hall's current vestibule.

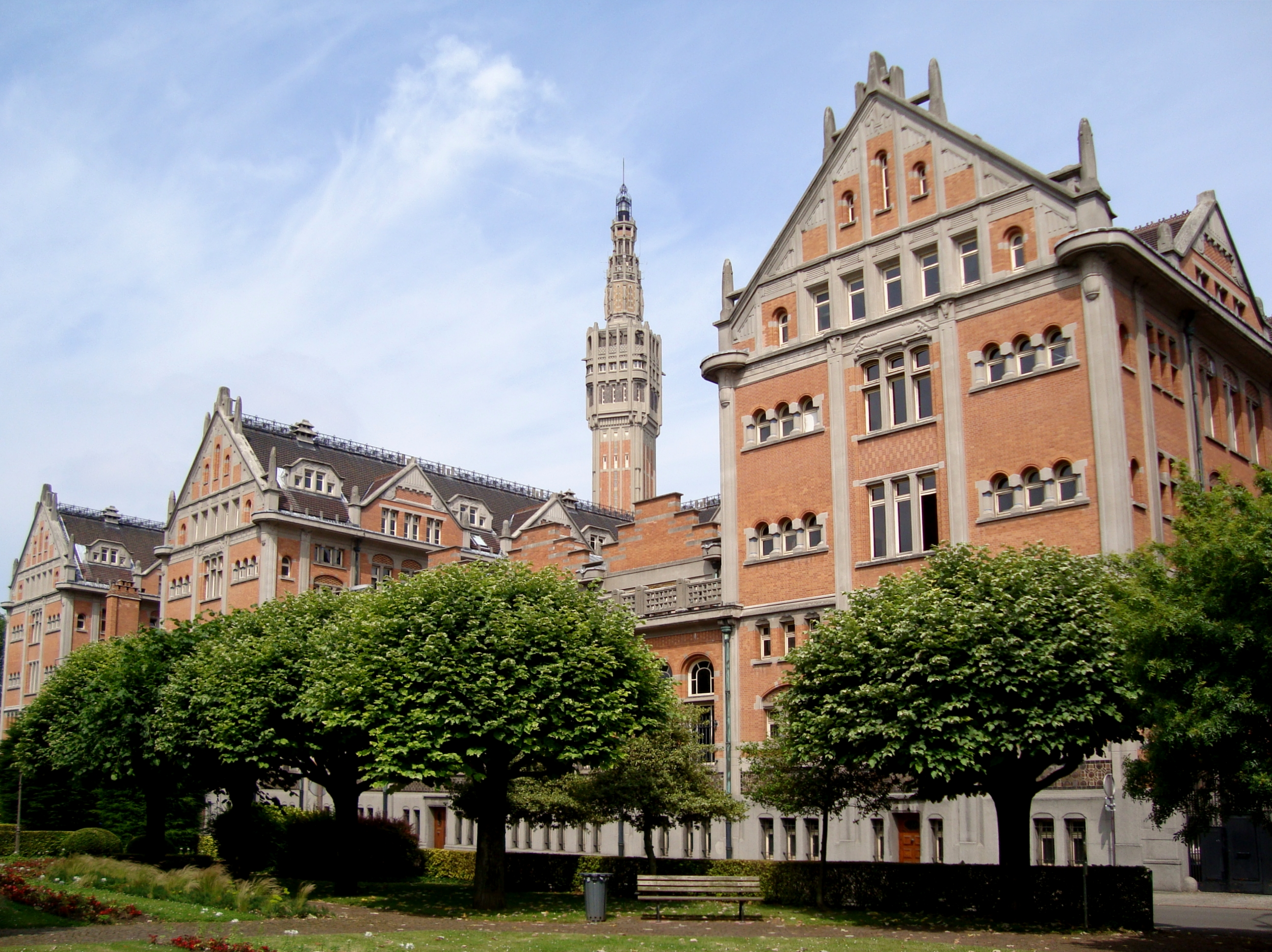
Three of the four imposing gables overlooking the Rue du Réduit

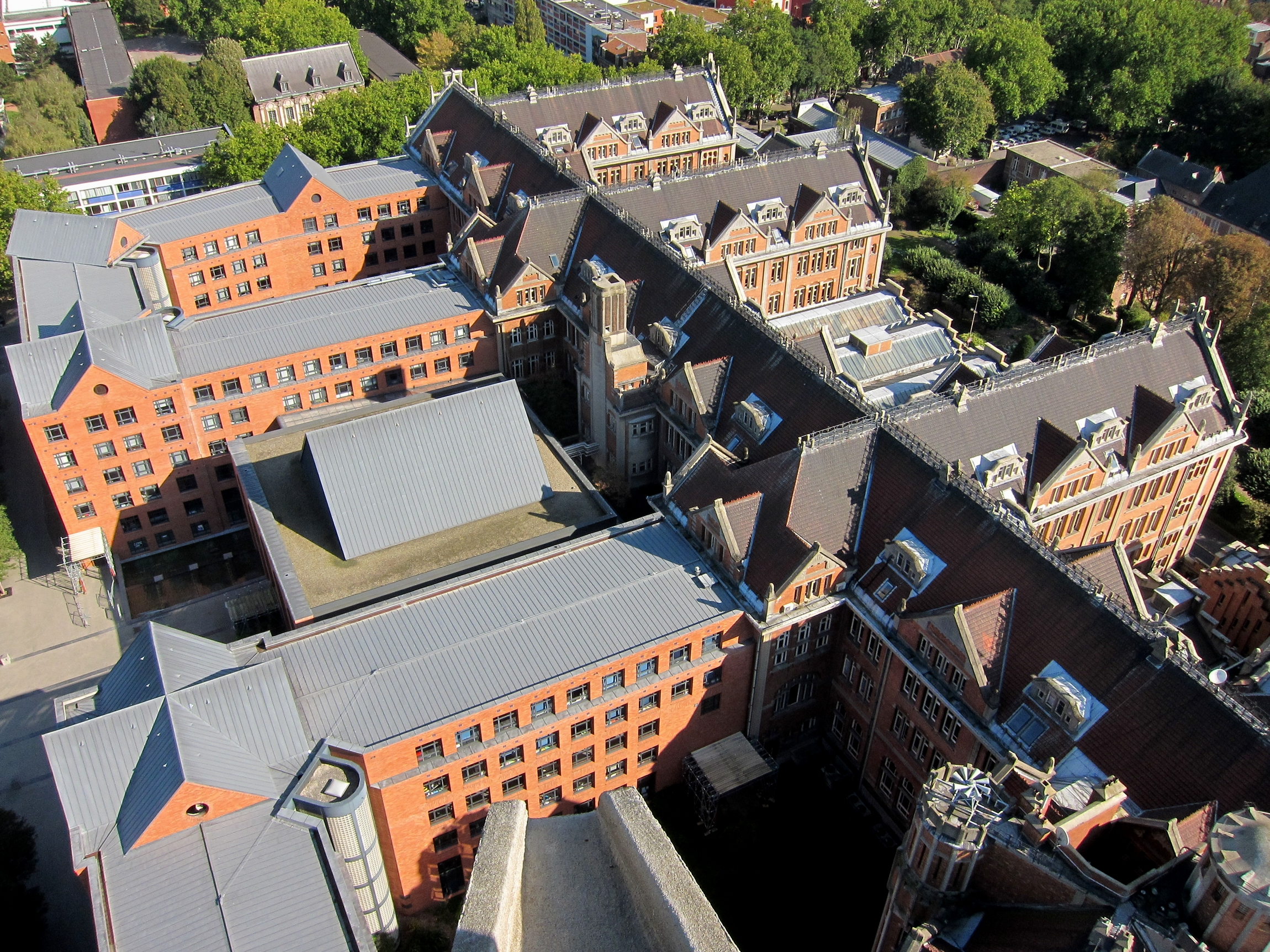
The Town Hall seen from the belfry, with its modern extension to the north

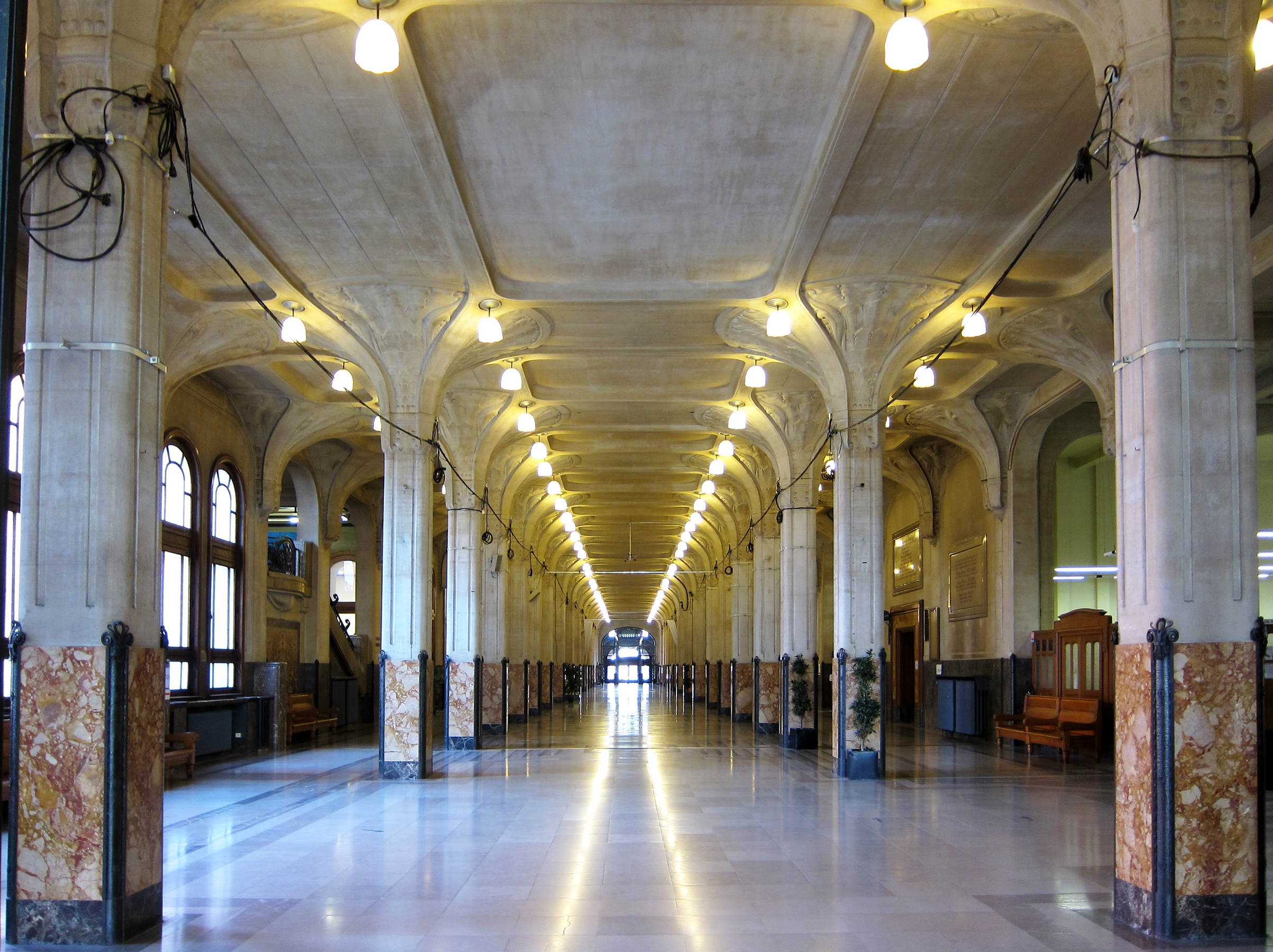
The Great Gallery

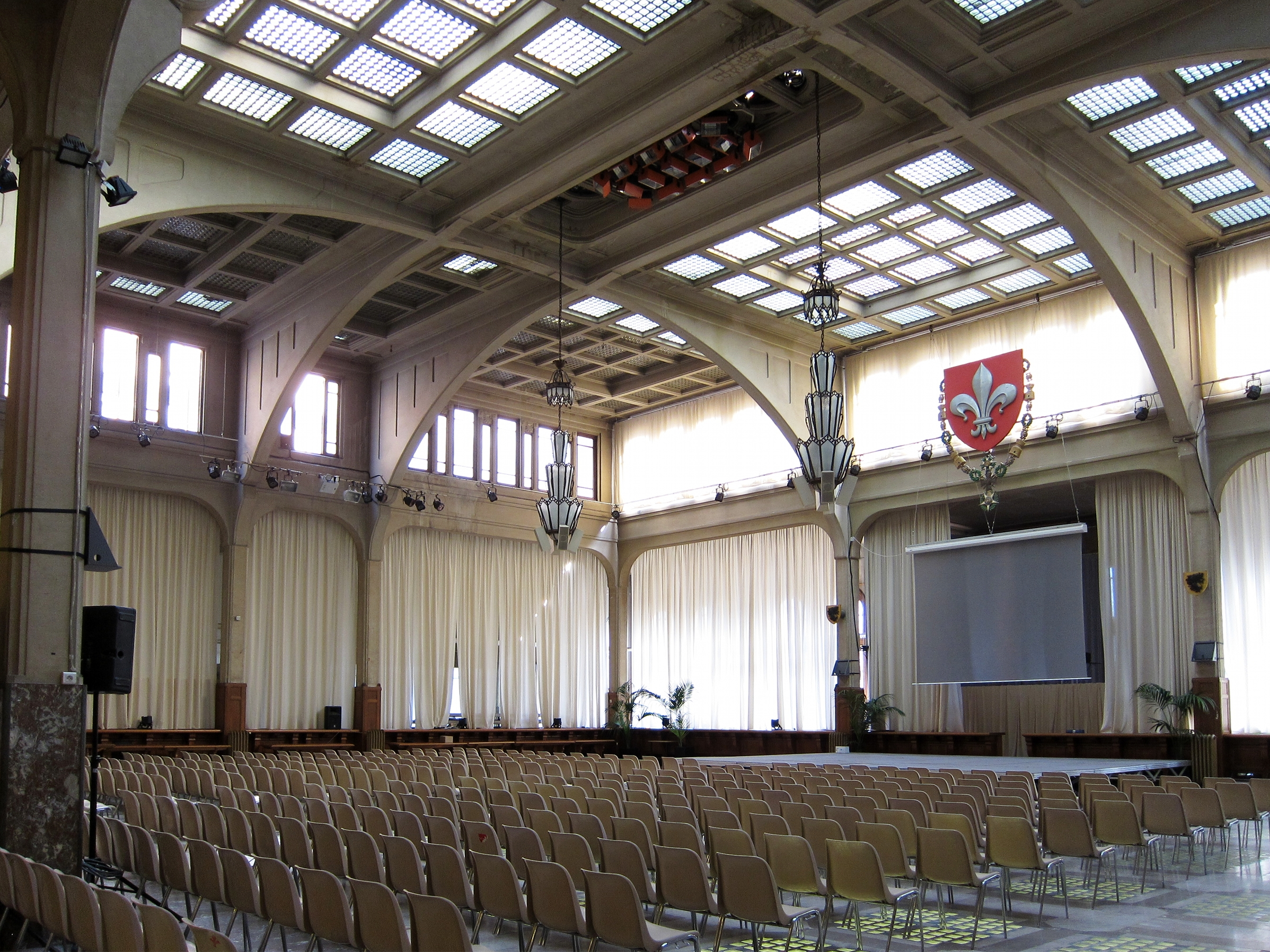
The Council Chamber
