= Maubeuge =

- Commune
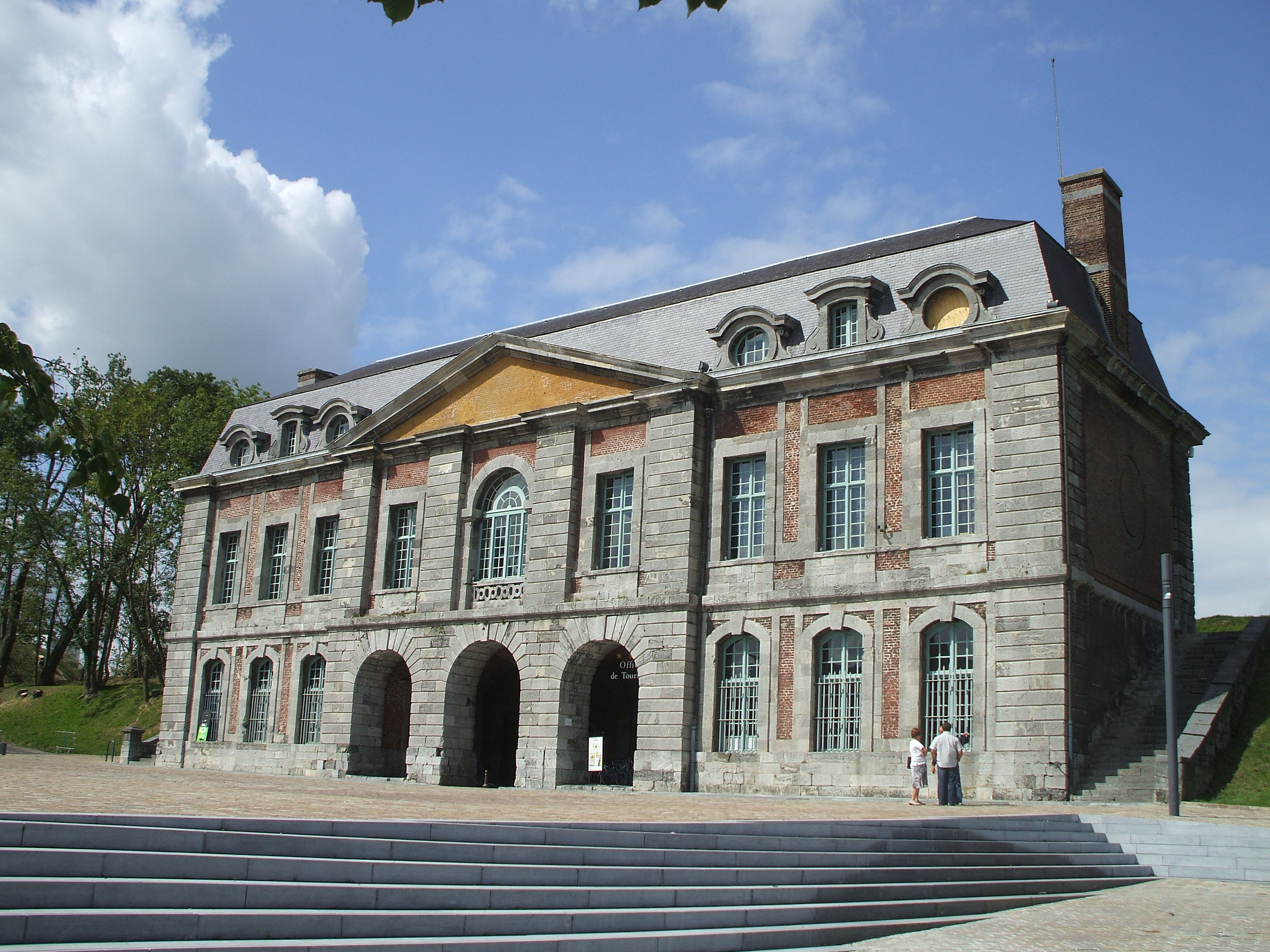
- Porte de Mons

- Coat of arms
- Location of Maubeuge
- Location within France Location within Hauts-de-France
- Coordinates: 50°16′39″N 3°58′24″E
- Country: France
- Region: Hauts-de-France
- Department: Nord
- Arrondissement: Avesnes-sur-Helpe
- Canton: Maubeuge
- Intercommunality: CA Maubeuge Val de Sambre

Government
  - Mayor (2020–2026): Arnaud Decagny
- Area^{1}: 18.85 km^{2} (7.28 sq mi)
- Population (2023): 28,767
  - Density: 1,526/km^{2} (3,953/sq mi)
- Time zone: UTC+01:00 (CET)
  - Summer (DST): UTC+02:00 (CEST)
- INSEE/Postal code: 59392 /59600
- ^{1} French Land Register data, which excludes lakes, ponds, glaciers > 1 km^{2} (0.386 sq mi or 247 acres) and river estuaries.

Maubeuge (French pronunciation: [mobøʒ]; historical Dutch: Mabuse or Dutch: Malbode; Picard: Maubeuche) is a commune in the Nord department in northern France.

It is situated on both banks of the Sambre (here canalized), 36 km (22 mi) east of Valenciennes and about 9 km (5.6 mi) from the Belgian border.

== History ==
Maubeuge (ancient Malbodium, from Latin, derived from the Old Frankish name Malboden, meaning "assizes of Boden") owes its origin to Maubeuge Abbey, a double monastery, for men and women, founded in the 7th century by Saint Aldego, the relics of whom are preserved in the church. It subsequently belonged to the territory of Hainaut.

The town was part of the Spanish Netherlands and changed hands a number of times before it was finally ceded to France in the 1678 Treaty of Nijmegen. As part of Vauban's pré carré plan that protected France's northern borders with a double line of fortresses, it was extensively fortified as directed by Louis XIV of France.

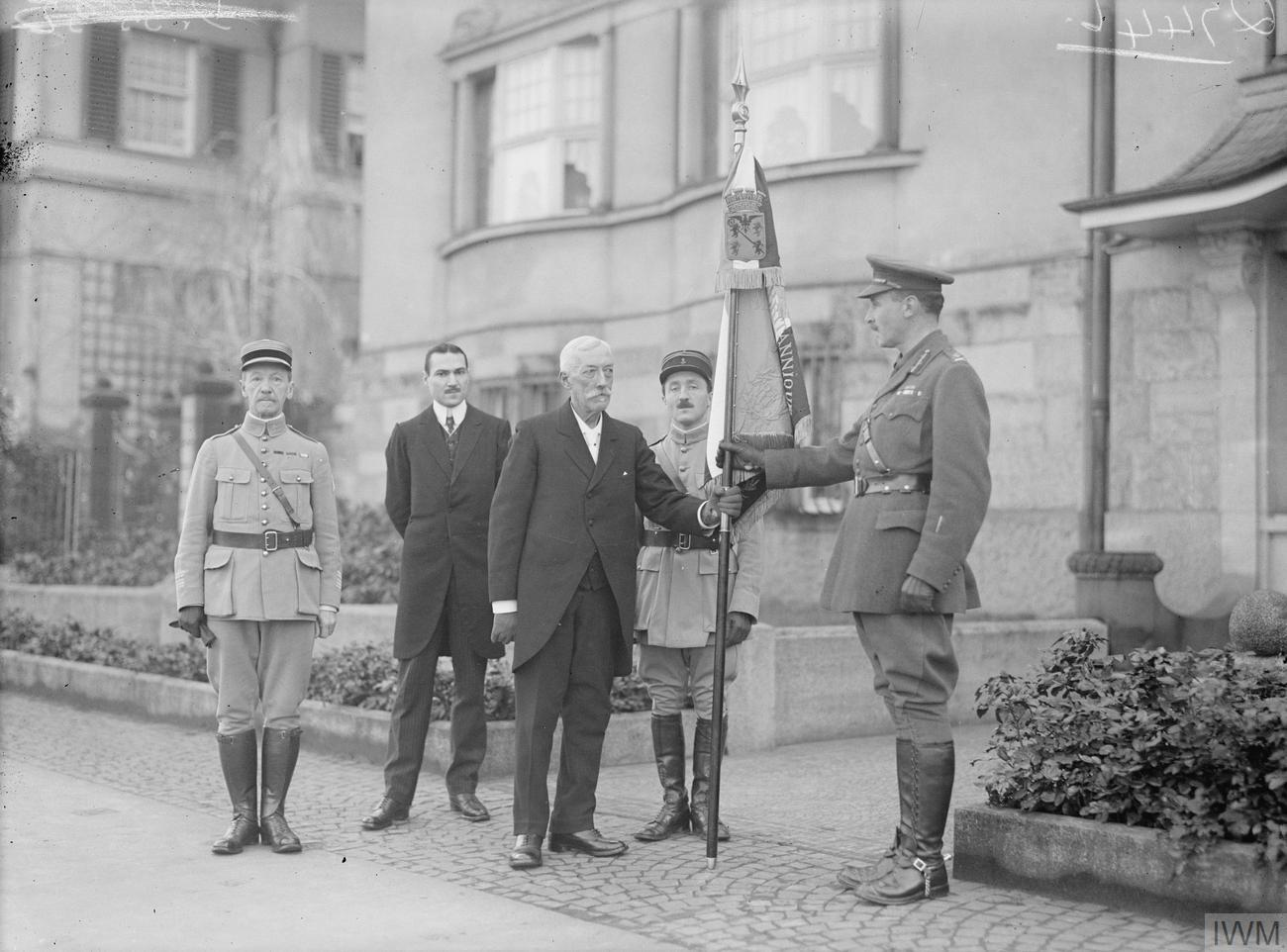
Mayor of Maubeuge presenting the British Guards Division with a flag as an appreciation from the town which was taken by the division on 9 November 1918. Major-General Torquhil Matheson is seen receiving the flag, 14 November 1918.

Besieged in 1793 by Prince Josias of Saxe-Coburg-Saalfeld, it was relieved by the victory of Wattignies, which is commemorated by a monument in the town. It was unsuccessfully besieged in 1814, but was compelled to capitulate, after a vigorous resistance, in the Hundred Days.

As a fortress, Maubeuge has an old enceinte of bastion trace which serves as the center of an important entrenched camp of 18 miles perimeter. The fortress was constructed after the War of 1870 but was later modernized and augmented.

The forts were besieged in World War I by the German Empire. Maubeuge suffered heavily in World War II: 90% of the town centre was destroyed by bombardments in May 1940. Fighting again occurred in early September 1944, in and around the outskirts of Maubeuge, involving units of the U.S. 1st Infantry Division during the American push toward Belgium.

After the war the town was rebuilt: the new buildings culminated in the new Hôtel de Ville which was completed in 1970.

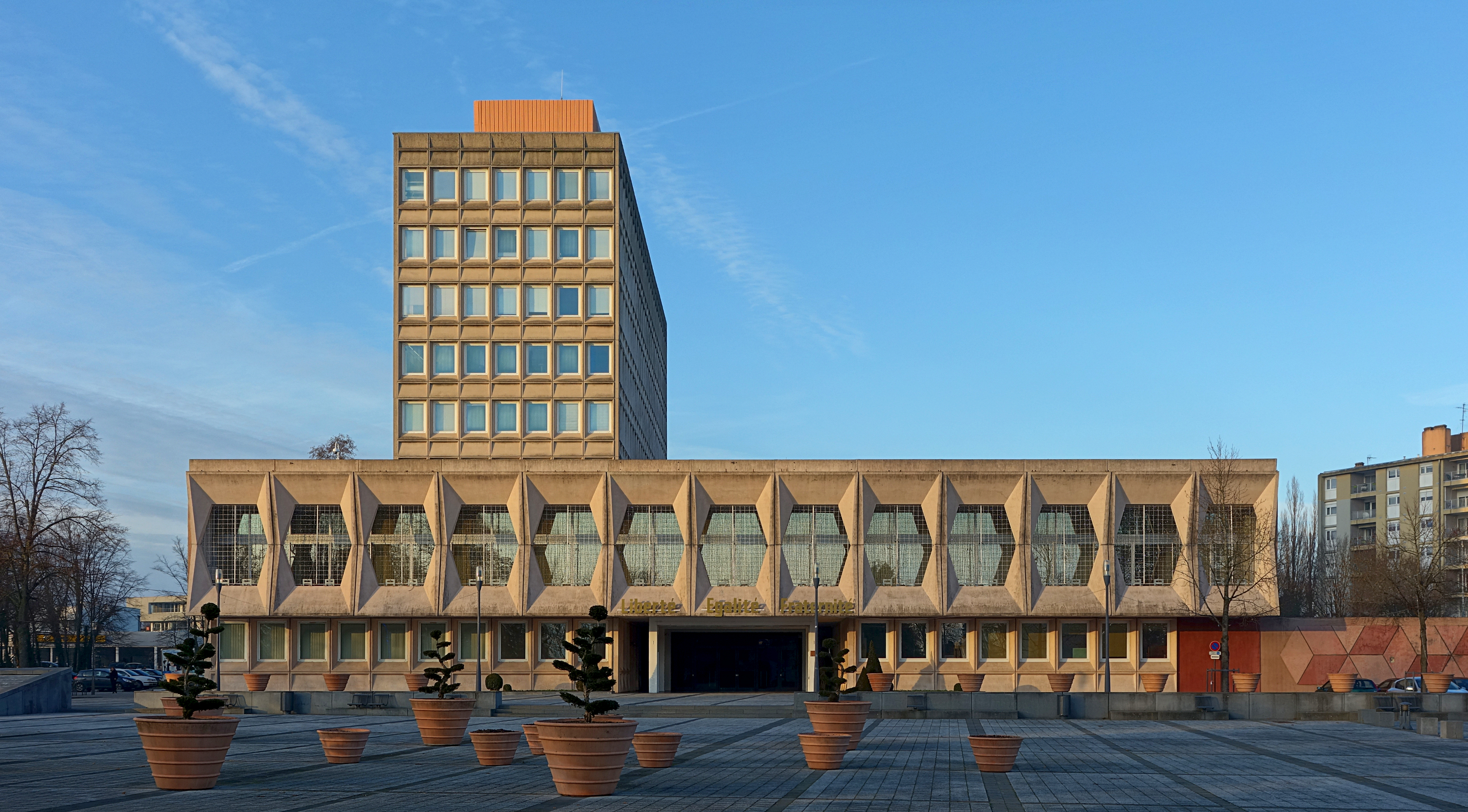
The Hôtel de Ville

=== Heraldry ===
Arms of Maubeuge	The arms of Maubeuge are blazoned : Or, 4 lions, 2 in bend sable armed and langued gules, 2 in bend sinister gules armed and langued azure, in chief an eagle sable beaked langued membered and armed gules, overall a crozier Or bendwise.

== Geography ==
=== Climate ===
Maubeuge has an oceanic climate (Köppen climate classification Cfb). The average annual temperature in Maubeuge is 10.6 °C (51.1 °F). The average annual rainfall is 880.8 mm (34.68 in) with December as the wettest month. The temperatures are highest on average in July, at around 18.5 °C (65.3 °F), and lowest in January, at around 3.2 °C (37.8 °F). The highest temperature ever recorded in Maubeuge was 37.5 °C (99.5 °F) on 7 August 2003; the coldest temperature ever recorded was −17.5 °C (0.5 °F) on 16 January 1985.

Climate data for Maubeuge (1981−2010 normals, extremes 1961−present)
Month	Jan	Feb	Mar	Apr	May	Jun	Jul	Aug	Sep	Oct	Nov	Dec	Year
Record high °C (°F)	15.0 (59.0)	18.2 (64.8)	24.9 (76.8)	29.5 (85.1)	32.0 (89.6)	33.5 (92.3)	35.5 (95.9)	37.5 (99.5)	34.5 (94.1)	25.6 (78.1)	19.5 (67.1)	17.0 (62.6)	37.5 (99.5)
Mean daily maximum °C (°F)	5.8 (42.4)	6.9 (44.4)	10.6 (51.1)	14.2 (57.6)	18.7 (65.7)	21.3 (70.3)	23.6 (74.5)	23.7 (74.7)	19.8 (67.6)	15.5 (59.9)	9.5 (49.1)	6.6 (43.9)	14.7 (58.5)
Daily mean °C (°F)	3.2 (37.8)	3.7 (38.7)	6.7 (44.1)	9.4 (48.9)	13.6 (56.5)	16.2 (61.2)	18.5 (65.3)	18.4 (65.1)	15.1 (59.2)	11.5 (52.7)	6.5 (43.7)	4.2 (39.6)	10.6 (51.1)
Mean daily minimum °C (°F)	0.6 (33.1)	0.6 (33.1)	2.8 (37.0)	4.6 (40.3)	8.6 (47.5)	11.1 (52.0)	13.4 (56.1)	13.1 (55.6)	10.3 (50.5)	7.6 (45.7)	3.6 (38.5)	1.7 (35.1)	6.5 (43.7)
Record low °C (°F)	−17.5 (0.5)	−13.7 (7.3)	−12.5 (9.5)	−6.0 (21.2)	−2.0 (28.4)	−1.5 (29.3)	3.3 (37.9)	4.0 (39.2)	0.0 (32.0)	−5.0 (23.0)	−11.5 (11.3)	−13.5 (7.7)	−17.5 (0.5)
Average precipitation mm (inches)	81.1 (3.19)	64.7 (2.55)	80.8 (3.18)	54.7 (2.15)	70.9 (2.79)	79.1 (3.11)	71.2 (2.80)	73.1 (2.88)	61.8 (2.43)	79.5 (3.13)	78.8 (3.10)	85.1 (3.35)	880.8 (34.68)
Average precipitation days (≥ 1.0 mm)	14.0	11.0	13.4	10.0	12.2	11.0	10.2	9.6	10.6	11.9	13.0	13.2	140.1
Source: Météo-France

== Population ==
Historical population

Year	Pop.	±% p.a.
1793	4,841	—
1800	4,726	−0.34%
1806	5,020	+1.01%
1821	5,736	+0.89%
1831	6,240	+0.85%
1836	6,363	+0.39%
1841	7,431	+3.15%
1846	7,328	−0.28%
1851	7,719	+1.05%
1856	8,663	+2.33%
1861	10,557	+4.03%
1866	10,877	+0.60%
1872	13,234	+3.32%
1876	14,398	+2.13%
1881	17,221	+3.65%
1886	18,329	+1.25%
1891	18,863	+0.58%
1896	19,799	+0.97%
1901	20,826	+1.02%

Year	Pop.	±% p.a.
1906	21,520	+0.66%
1911	23,209	+1.52%
1921	21,173	−0.91%
1926	23,338	+1.97%
1931	24,221	+0.75%
1936	23,622	−0.50%
1946	20,859	−1.24%
1954	24,215	+1.88%
1962	27,214	+1.47%
1968	32,028	+2.75%
1975	35,399	+1.44%
1982	36,061	+0.27%
1990	34,989	−0.38%
1999	33,546	−0.47%
2007	32,667	−0.33%
2012	30,994	−1.05%
2017	29,944	−0.69%
2023	28,767	−0.67%

Source: EHESS and INSEE (1968-2023)

== Economy ==
There are important foundries, forges and blast furnaces, together with manufactures of machine tools and porcelain.

The town has a board of trade arbitration, a communal college, a commercial and industrial school.

== Transport ==
Being close to the Belgian border, Maubeuge station has two lines to Belgium: one leading North towards Mons, the other Eastbound to Charleroi. Neither have seen passenger service for several years; however, from December 2018 a limited service to Namur via Charleroi was announced. Trains to the South-West are frequent.

The nearest airports are Charleroi Airport, located 64 km (40 mi) north east, Lille Airport, located 83 km (52 mi) north west and Brussels Airport, located 103 km (64 mi) north of Maubeuge.

== Tour de France ==
Maurice Garin, the winner of the inaugural 1903 Tour de France, began his cycling career in 1892 with the local Maubeuge cycling club, when he finished fifth in the 200-kilometre (124 mi) Maubeuge-Hirson-Maubeuge race. In 2003, on the 100th anniversary of his win, he was commemorated with a street named after him.

== Notable people ==
- Leandre Griffit, footballer
- Jan Gossaert, painter
- Benjamin Pavard, footballer
- Benjamin Saint-Huile, politician
- Kevin Van Den Kerkhof, footballer
- André Lurçat, architect

== See also ==
- Siege of Maubeuge (24 August - 7 September 1914)
- Fortified Sector of Maubeuge
- Communes of the Nord department
- Un clair de lune à Maubeuge

== Sources ==
- http://www.lonesentry.com/gi_stories_booklets/1stinfantry/
