= Roger Salengro =

French politician (1890–1936)

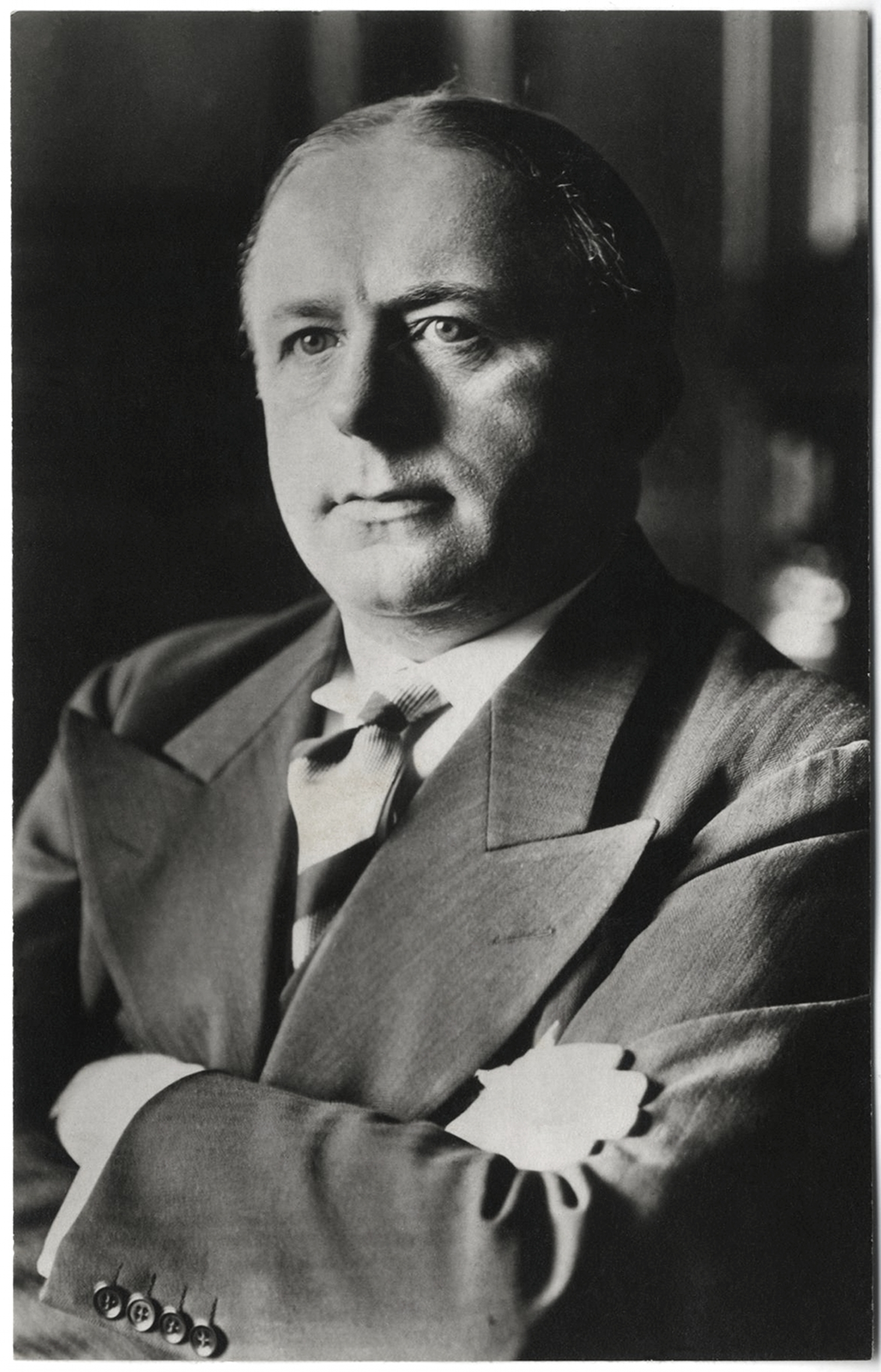
- Salengro in 1930
- Born: Roger Henri Charles Salengro; 30 May 1890; Lille, France
- Died: 18 November 1936 (aged 46); Lille, France
- Education: Charles de Gaulle University – Lille III
- Occupation: Politician

Roger Henri Charles Salengro (30 May 1890 – 18 November 1936) was a French politician. He achieved fame as Minister of the Interior during the Popular Front government in 1936. He committed suicide a few months after taking office, after being hounded by a calumny campaign orchestrated by extreme right-wing newspapers.

== Early years ==
In 1909, Salengro enrolled at the University of Lille to study literature. The same year, he joined the French Section of the Workers' International, a socialist party, and founded a left-wing students' organisation.

In 1914, he signed up to join the French military for the First World War, despite having spoken out as a pacifist in previous years. Captured by the Germans on 7 October 1915, he became a prisoner of war. He refused to work in a German factory, and was incarcerated. His treatment was harsh; he weighed only 42 kg when he was freed after the war.

In 1918, he became a journalist, and resumed his involvement in politics. In 1919, he was elected municipal councillor in Lille, and general councillor of the Lille-Sud-Ouest canton.

In 1925, Salengro was elected mayor of Lille. He was re-elected in 1929 and in 1935. In 1928, he was elected Member of Parliament, then re-elected in 1932 and in 1936.

== Member of Cabinet, and suicide ==
The 1936 legislative election brought the Popular Front to power for the first time, led by Léon Blum. Blum appointed Salengro Minister of the Interior. The new government set about implementing social reforms, and one of its first achievements was the signing of the Matignon Agreements, which was publicly announced by Salengro.

The 1930s were marked by the activities of extreme right-wing groups violently opposed to the Popular Front. The government was opposed by right-wing extremist leagues such as the Croix-de-Feu, by the anti-Semitic, monarchist Action Française and by the fascist terrorist group La Cagoule. On 14 July, France's national day, celebrated with military ceremonies, the Action Française's newspaper published a libelous article claiming that Salengro had not been captured by German forces in 1915 but had instead deserted. The claim was relayed by other far-right movements, and reprinted repeatedly in far-right newspapers such as Gringoire, sparking the "Salengro Affair". It was echoed in the National Assembly by far-right Members of Parliament such as Henri Becquart. A military commission which looked into the claims refuted them categorically, but the calumny persisted. No shred of evidence was ever put forward to support the claim that Salengro's service during the war had been anything other than honourable. On 13 November, at Léon Blum's initiative, the Assembly voted to condemn the libelous campaign, by 427 votes out of 530.

During the night of 17–18 November, "exhausted and ill", Roger Salengro committed suicide at his home in Lille, where he lived alone. A million people attended his funeral on 22 November.

On 14 April 2009, France 2 broadcast a television film about the "Salengro Affair", entitled L'Affaire Salengro. Roger Salengro was played by actor Bernard-Pierre Donnadieu.
